= Sambal stingray =

Seafood dish

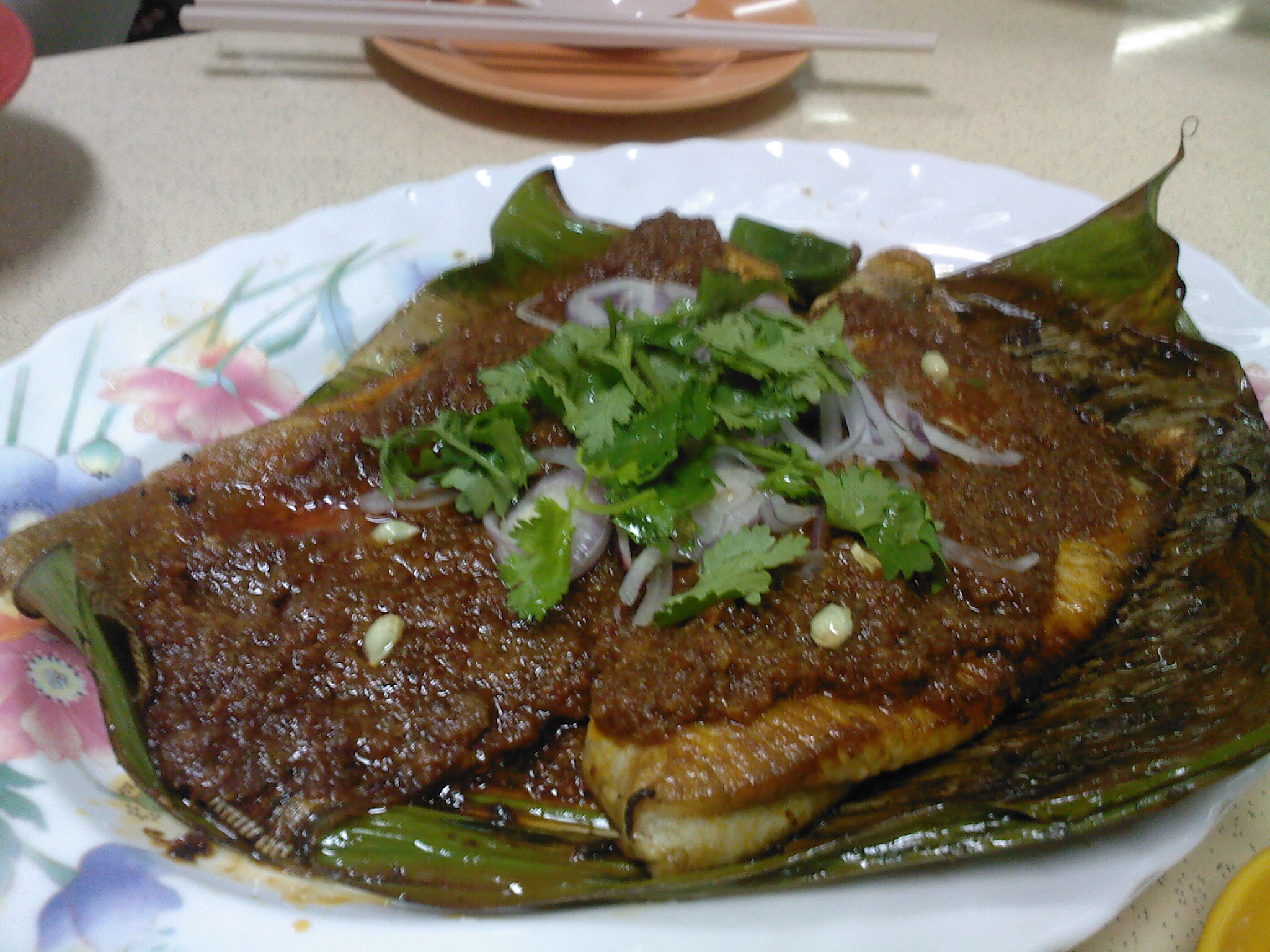
- Course: Main course
- Place of origin: Malaysia
- Created by: Malay people
- Serving temperature: Hot temperature
- Main ingredients: Stingray, sambal

Sambal pari, also known in English as stingray sambal or spicy banana leaf stingray and by the Malay name ikan pari bakar (grilled stingray fish), is a Malaysian/Singaporean seafood dish. Prepared by grilling stingray, it is served with sambal paste atop. Sambal pari can be easily purchased at hawker centers in both Malaysia and Singapore.

== History ==
Stingray was previously deemed as not popular and was cheap to purchase; given the enhancement of its taste, the value of stingray in markets has since risen. Originating from Malaysia, the dish is now also popular among Singaporeans. Its Malay name is ikan bakar, which literally means ‘grilled fish’.

== Ingredients ==
The sambal paste served with the stingray is made up of spices (sometimes including belachan), Indian walnuts, and shallots. Other ingredients may include garlic, sugar, Chinese parsley, or raw peanuts. The paste is then spread on top of stingray fins, preferably fresh ones. In addition, female ones are preferred to male ones. White fish is in some instances used as an alternative, usually when stingray cannot be found. Flavor enhancers include white pepper or salt. Other recipes involve small amounts of brandy and olive oil. The dish is commonly accompanied with lime or lemon.

== Preparation ==
Usually wrapped in banana leaves for ten minutes to cook, the fins of the stingray are first chopped to smaller bits. It also can be wrapped in ginger leaves or aluminium foil. Sambal stingray is charcoal-grilled.

== See also ==
- Malaysian cuisine
- Cuisine of Singapore
