= Crab bee hoon =

Singaporean rice vermicelli dish

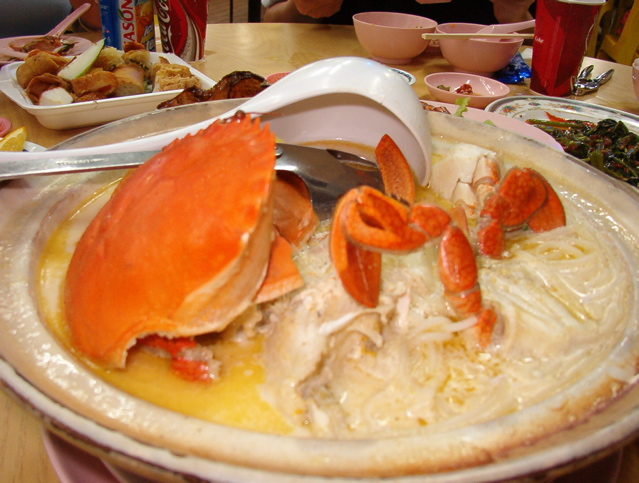
- Course: Main course
- Place of origin: Singapore
- Region or state: Nationwide in Singapore
- Serving temperature: Hot
- Main ingredients: Rice vermicelli (bee hoon) and mud crab

Crab bee hoon (Chinese: 螃蟹米粉; pinyin: pángxiè mífěn) is a Singaporean rice vermicelli dish consisting of whole mud crab served with rice vermicelli. The dish is commonly prepared with a rich seafood broth or sauce, with both soupy and dry variations found in Singapore.

Crab bee hoon is particularly associated with Sin Huat Eating House in Geylang, where chef Danny Lee developed the restaurant's signature version. According to accounts of the restaurant's history, Lee was working as a cook after leaving the pig-farming industry when a customer suggested combining crab and noodles into a single dish rather than ordering the two separately. Lee subsequently developed and refined the preparation, which he entered in the AsiaFood competition in 1997.

The origins of crab bee hoon as a dish are not universally agreed upon, although Sin Huat's version has been described in food writing as having been invented at the restaurant. Its crab bee hoon subsequently became one of the restaurant's best-known dishes and helped establish the restaurant's reputation internationally.

== Cultural impact ==
CNN Travel listed the crab bee hoon at Sin Huat Eating House as one of its "top 5 food picks from Singapore's most notorious red-light district".

Crab bee hoon shot to fame when Anthony Bourdain raved about the dish after trying it at Sin Huat Eating House during a segment of A Cook's Tour. Bourdain named it one of "13 Places to Eat Before You Die," at number 5. He's also describing its crab bee hoon as “giant Sri Lankan beasts cooked with a spicy mystery sauce and noodles — pure messy indulgence.”

The restaurant's crab bee hoon has since become closely associated with Chef Danny Lee and Sin Huat Eating House. Contemporary accounts describe the dish as the restaurant's signature preparation, with Lee personally overseeing its preparation.

== See also ==
- Singaporean cuisine
- List of noodle dishes
- Rice noodles
