= Sin Huat Eating House =

Restaurant information
- Established: 1979
- Head chef: Danny Lee
- Food type: Seafood/Singaporean Cuisine
- Location: 659/661 Lorong 35 Geylang, Singapore, Singapore
- Website: https://sinhuateatinghouse.com/

Sin Huat Eating House is a seafood restaurant in Geylang, Singapore, established in 1979. It is best known for its signature crab bee hoon, the creation of which food critic KF Seetoh has attributed to chef Danny Lee. The restaurant has received the Michelin Guide's Bib Gourmand distinction in multiple editions and has received international attention through coverage by Anthony Bourdain, who listed it among his "13 Places to Eat Before You Die" and praised its crab bee hoon.

== History ==
Sin Huat Eating House has operated in Geylang since 1979. Food writer Meredith Sayles described the restaurant as having been established in 1979 and later taken over by chef Danny Lee.

Lee was previously a pig farmer and entered the restaurant business after the closure of his pig farm in the early 1990s. He initially prepared zi char dishes before developing a focus on seafood.

=== Crab bee hoon ===
The origins of Sin Huat's signature crab bee hoon have been attributed to Lee. According to an account of the restaurant's history, a customer asked Lee to combine a crab dish with hor fun rather than order the two dishes separately. Lee subsequently developed the combination into crab bee hoon and submitted the dish to an AsiaFood competition in 1997. Food critic KF Seetoh has also attributed the creation of crab bee hoon to Sin Huat and Lee.

The dish subsequently became closely associated with the restaurant and has been the subject of coverage by international food and travel publications. The Michelin Guide has described the restaurant's fried rice vermicelli with crab as its main dish, noting the use of crab stock in the vermicelli and the inclusion of whole crabs.

== Cuisine and dining style ==
Sin Huat Eating House primarily serves seafood dishes. Its signature crab bee hoon is prepared with crab and rice vermicelli, while other dishes reported in coverage of the restaurant include frog legs served with chicken essence, prawns and scallops. The restaurant has also been associated with poached gong gong.

The restaurant operates in a traditional coffee shop setting. Accounts of the restaurant have described a distinctive ordering system in which there is no conventional printed menu and Danny Lee personally takes orders and prepares dishes. A 2017 food guide similarly described the restaurant as being run largely by Lee, who took orders and cooked the dishes himself.

The premises also contain other food businesses operating separately from the seafood restaurant. A braised duck rice stall within the premises has been reported in local media.

== Reception ==
=== Michelin Guide ===
In the Michelin Guide, the restaurant is listed as Sin Huat Seafood Restaurant. The Michelin listing gives it a Bib Gourmand designation and describes the fried rice vermicelli with crab as its main dish.

Sin Huat Seafood Restaurant has received the Michelin Guide Bib Gourmand distinction for ten consecutive editions of the Singapore guide, from 2016 to 2026.

=== Anthony Bourdain ===
Anthony Bourdain visited Sin Huat Eating House with Singaporean food critic KF Seetoh during the Singapore episode of his television series A Cook's Tour, titled "Singapore: New York in Twenty Years". During the visit, Bourdain sampled several of the restaurant's seafood dishes, including steamed scallops, gong gong, frog legs and its signature crab bee hoon. The episode was first broadcast in 2003.

Bourdain later listed Sin Huat among his "13 Places to Eat Before You Die" in Men's Health in 2011. He also described the restaurant as "crummy-looking yet utterly fabulous" and praised its crab bee hoon as "sublime".

Bourdain's visit subsequently became an important part of the restaurant's international profile. Condé Nast Traveller later included Sin Huat in its coverage of places to eat in Asia, while KF Seetoh continued to write about Bourdain's connection with the restaurant and its crab bee hoon.

=== Other recognition ===
Sin Huat Eating House has also been included in publications covering Singapore's food culture and Geylang's dining scene. The Urban Redevelopment Authority included the restaurant in its guide to the food establishments of Geylang.

== See also ==
- Geylang
- Singaporean cuisine
- Zi char
- Michelin Guide
- Bib Gourmand
