= Vegetarian bee hoon =

Singaporean noodle dish

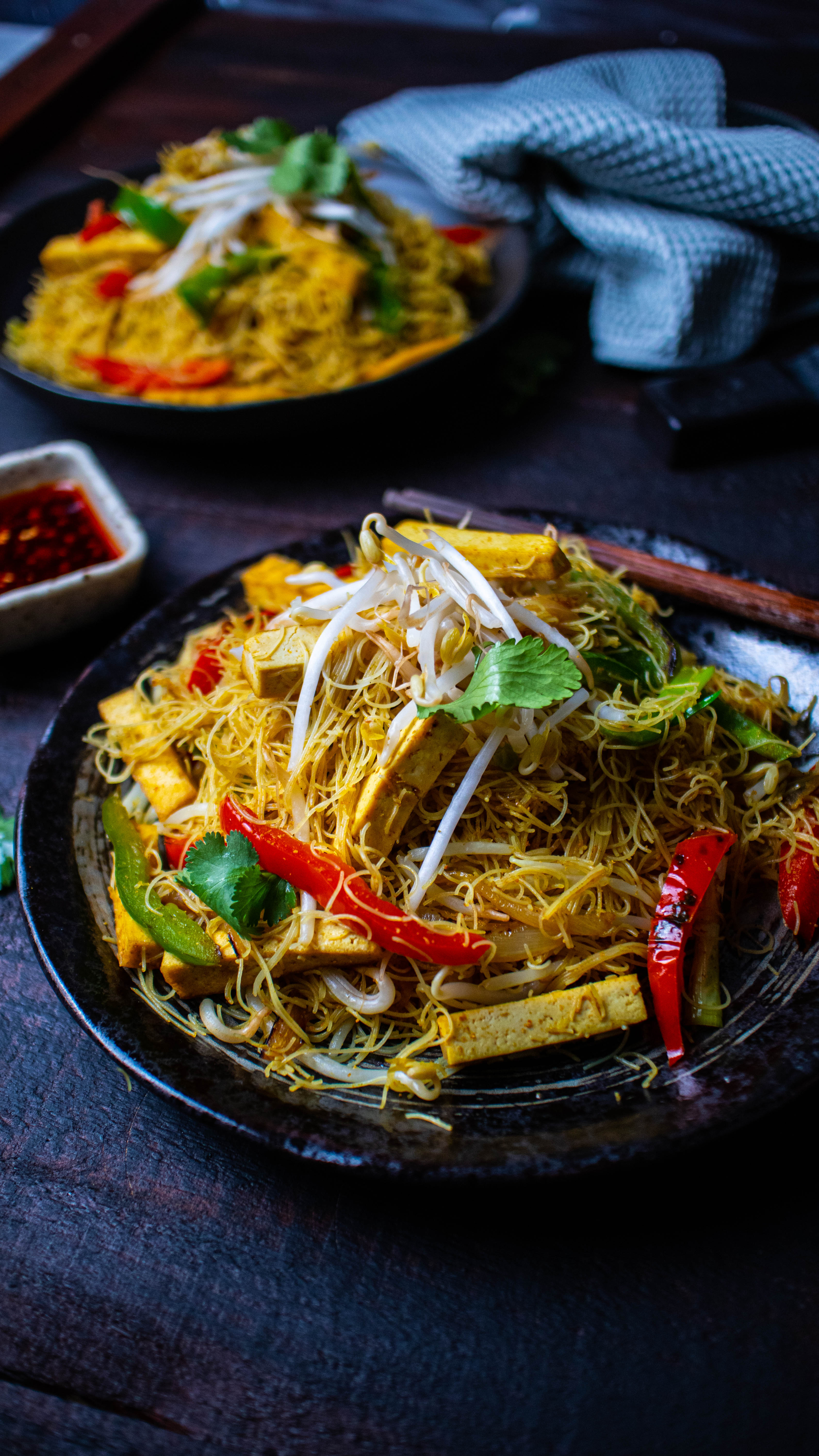
- Vegetarian bee hoon
- Course: Main course
- Place of origin: Singapore
- Region or state: Nationwide in Singapore
- Serving temperature: Hot
- Main ingredients: Rice vermicelli, spring rolls, fried tofu skin, and mock meats made from gluten
- Variations: Fried Bee Hoon

Vegetarian bee hoon is a Singaporean noodle dish which comprises vegetarian spring rolls, fried tofu skin, and mock meats made from gluten. Usually, the bee hoon is fried first and put in a large container, when an order is placed, other cooked ingredients are added to the bee hoon. Vegetarian bee hoon and other Chinese vegetarian culinary dishes are said to have originated from vegetarian restaurants established by Chinese Buddhist women.

== See also ==
- Singaporean cuisine
- List of noodle dishes
