= Kuai tiao =

Thai noodle dish

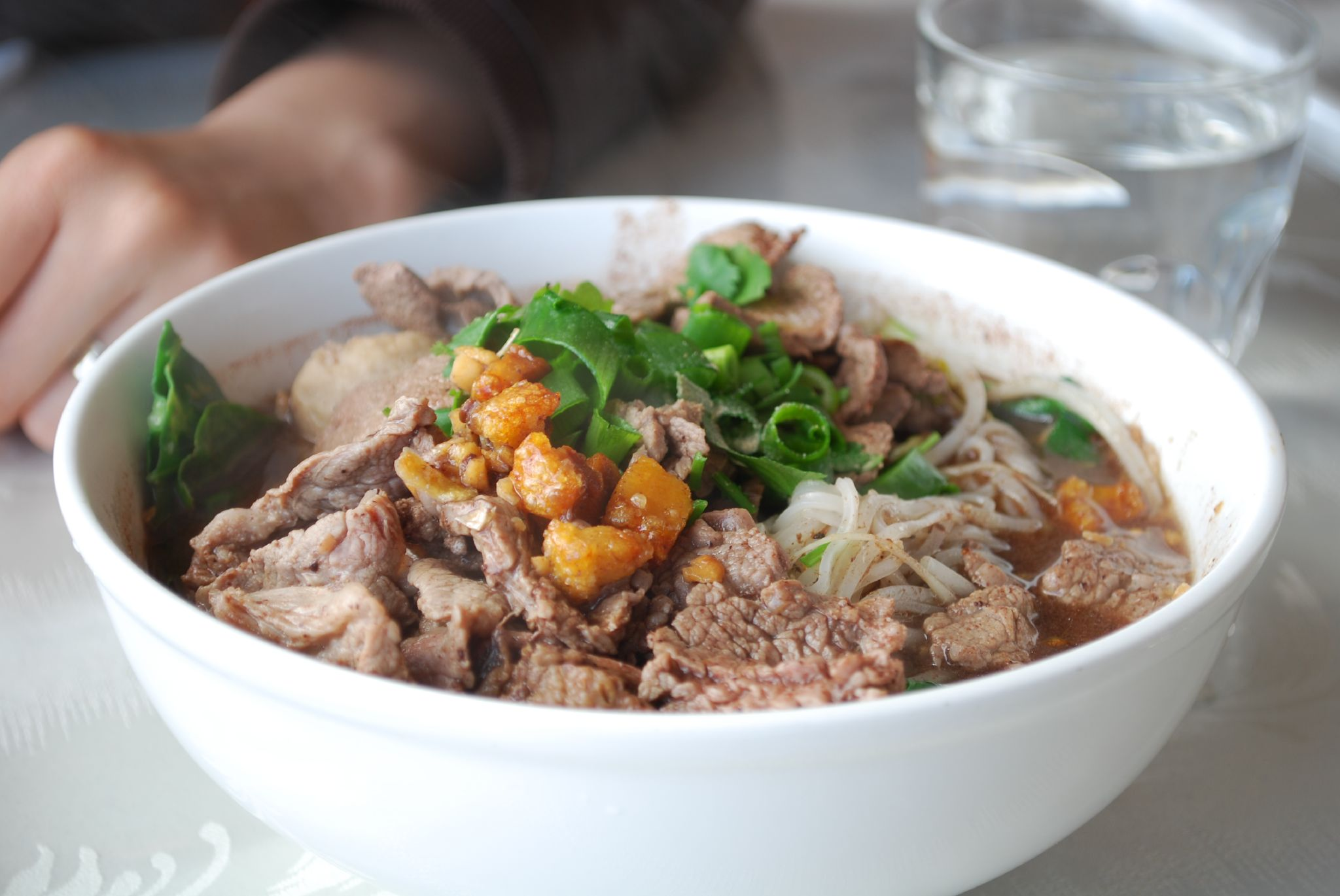
- Place of origin: Thailand
- Associated cuisine: Thai
- Created by: Derived from Chinese kway teow
- Main ingredients: Rice noodles, pork, beef, poultry, seafood, broth
- Similar dishes: Kuyteav, kyay oh, shahe fen, hủ tiếu

Kuai tiao
- Chinese: 粿條
Transcriptions
Standard Mandarin
- Hanyu Pinyin: guǒ tiáo
Southern Min
- Teochew Peng'im: guê^{2} diao^{5}

Thai name
- Thai: ก๋วยเตี๋ยว

Kuai tiao or kuaitiao (Thai: ก๋วยเตี๋ยว, from Chinese: 粿條) is a group of Thai rice noodle dishes of Chinese origin. It is a derivative of kway teow, Southern Chinese noodles with several local variants throughout Southeast Asia.

Chinese noodle dishes may have been introduced to Siam during the Ayutthaya period, but the earliest written mention of kuaitiao dates only to 1898, in the Bangkok Times. The dish was popularized among ethnic Thais following an initiative of Prime Minister Plaek Pibulsonggram in 1942, during World-War-II shortages.

Today, many variants of kuaitiao are known, including local styles such as khao soi from northern Thailand, kuaitiao Sukhothai from the Sukhothai area, kuaitiao ruea 'boat noodles' from the central region, kuaitiao liang from the East, and the stir-fried pad thai.
