= Fried kway teow =

Fried kway teow may refer to:

- Kwetiau goreng, Indonesian fried kway teow
- Char kway teow, Malaysian, or Singaporean fried kway teow
