= Pad thai =

Stir-fried noodle dish from Thailand

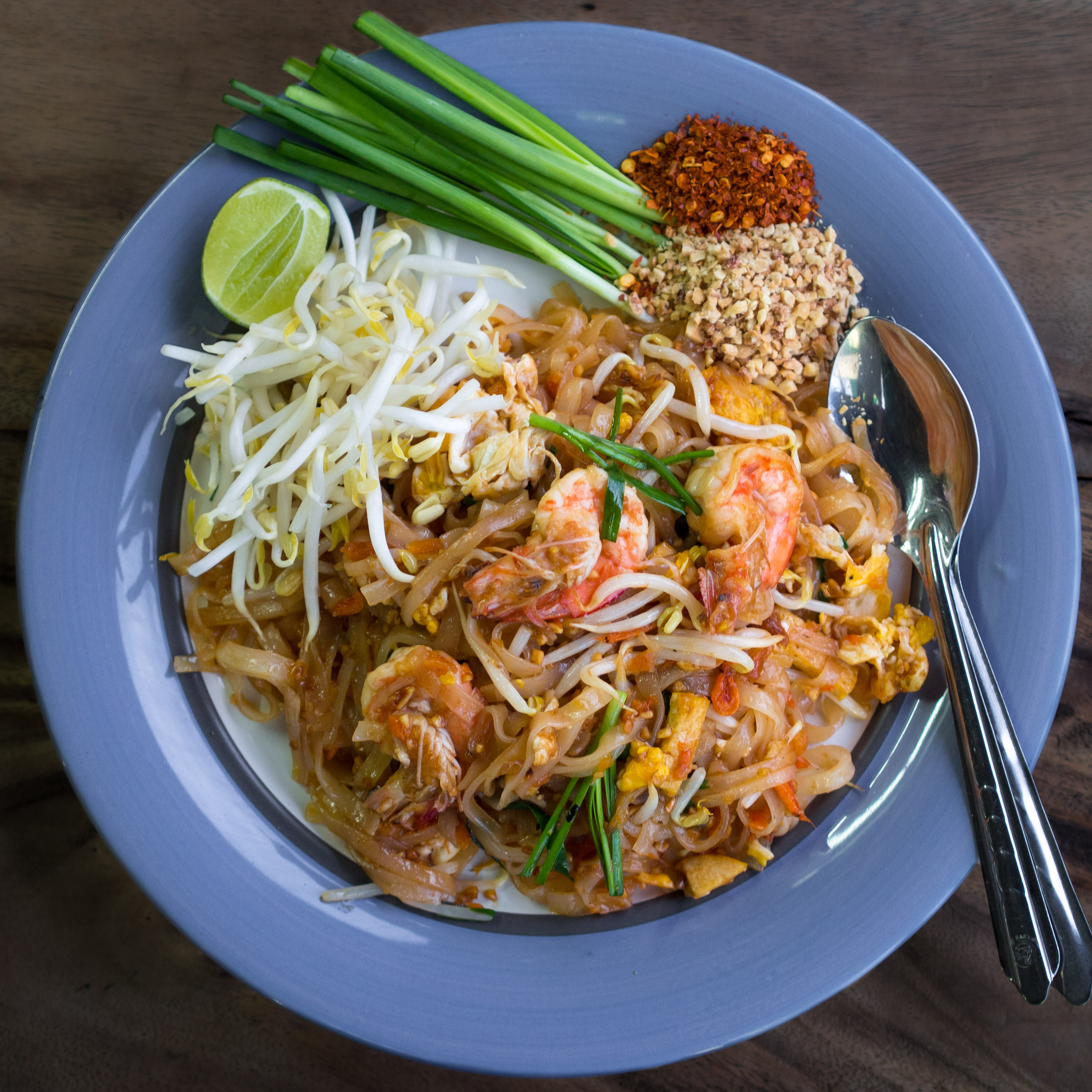
- Street stall pad thai from Chiang Mai in northern Thailand served with bean sprouts and green onion
- Alternative names: Phad thai, Phat thai
- Type: Rice noodle dish
- Course: Main
- Place of origin: Thailand
- Associated cuisine: Thai
- Serving temperature: Hot
- Main ingredients: Rice noodles; eggs; tofu; tamarind juice; palm sugar or coconut sugar; fish sauce; fresh shrimp or prawn; dried shrimp; bean sprouts; garlic or shallots; red chili pepper; lime; peanuts

Pad thai (/ˌpɑːd ˈtaɪ/ or /ˌpæd ˈtaɪ/; Thai: ผัดไทย, RTGS: phat thai, ISO: p̄hạd thịy, pronounced [pʰàt̚ tʰāj]) is a stir-fried rice noodle dish commonly served as a street food in Thailand as part of Thai cuisine. It is typically made with rice noodles, shrimp, peanuts, green onions, scrambled egg, sugar and bean sprouts. The ingredients are fried in a wok.

== History ==
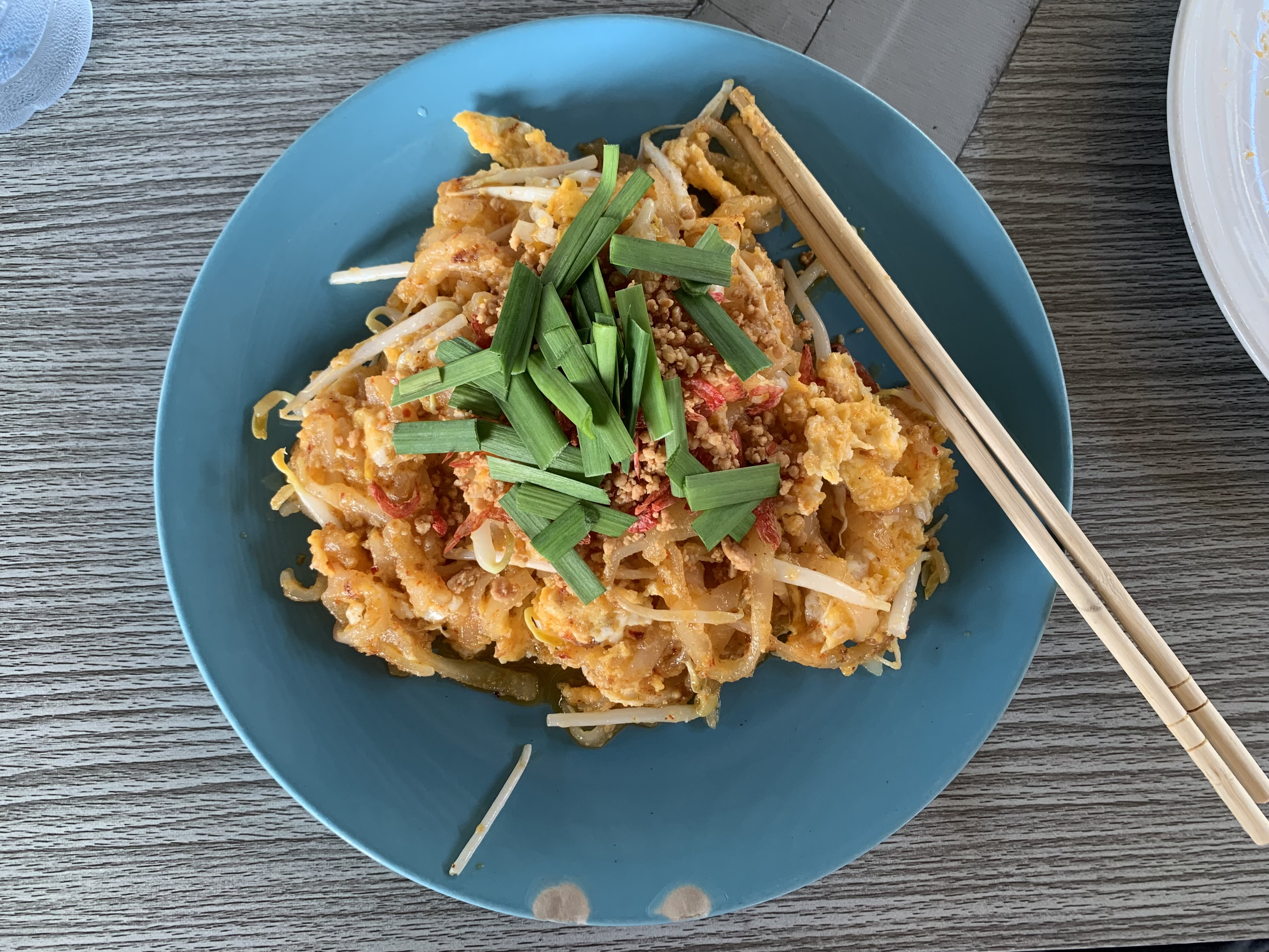
A dish of "ancient recipe" pad thai (ผัดไทยโบราณ; RTGS: pad thai boran) in Mueang Ang Thong claimed to have been a 120-year-old recipe

Pad thai was originally called kuai tiao pad thai, but this was later shortened to simply pad thai. Kuai tiao (ก๋วยเตี๋ยว) is a Thai borrowing from the Teochew word guê^{2} diao^{5} (粿條), which means a type of thick Chinese rice noodle also known as shahe fen. The word kuai tiao has cognates in several other Southeast Asian countries where Chinese immigrants settled; with kuyteav in Cambodia, hủ tiếu in Vietnam, and kway teow in Malaysia and Singapore being analogues.

Although stir-fried rice noodles were introduced to Thailand from China centuries ago, the dish pad thai was invented in the mid-20th century. American author Mark Padoongpatt maintains that pad thai is "...not this traditional, authentic, going back hundreds of years dish. It was actually created in the 1930s in Thailand. The dish was created because Thailand was focused on nation-building. So this dish was created using rice noodles and it was called pad thai as a way to galvanize nationalism."

The commonly held explanation of pad thai's provenance is that during World War II, Thailand suffered a rice shortage due to the war and floods. To reduce domestic rice consumption, the Thai government under Prime Minister Plaek Phibunsongkhram promoted consumption of noodles instead. His government promoted rice noodles and helped to establish the modern identity of Thailand. As a result, a new noodle dish called sen chan pad thai (named after Chanthaburi Province) was created. Pad thai has since become one of Thailand's national dishes.

Another explanation by Thai-American food writer Kasma Loha-unchit suggests that pad thai was invented by the Thai Chinese immigrants, because "for a dish to be so named in its own country clearly suggests an origin that isn't Thai". Noodle cookery in most Southeast Asian countries was introduced by the wave of immigrants from southern China settling in the region the past century. Loha-unchit states that the ethnic Chinese of Thailand were aware that "Central Thai people were very fond of the combination of hot, sour, sweet and salty flavors, they added these to their stir-fried noodle dishes and gave it a fusion name, much like Western chefs today are naming their dishes Thai this or Thai that on their East-West menus."

At least as early as 2001, the Thai government used pad thai as a form of "soft power", creating "the Global Thai Restaurant Company, Ltd., in an effort to establish at least 3,000 Thai restaurants worldwide." The plan included numerous government agencies and resulted in nearly tripling the number of Thai restaurants globally in seventeen years.

Pad thai is listed at number five on a list of "World's 50 most delicious foods" readers' poll compiled by CNN Go in 2011.

== Ingredients ==
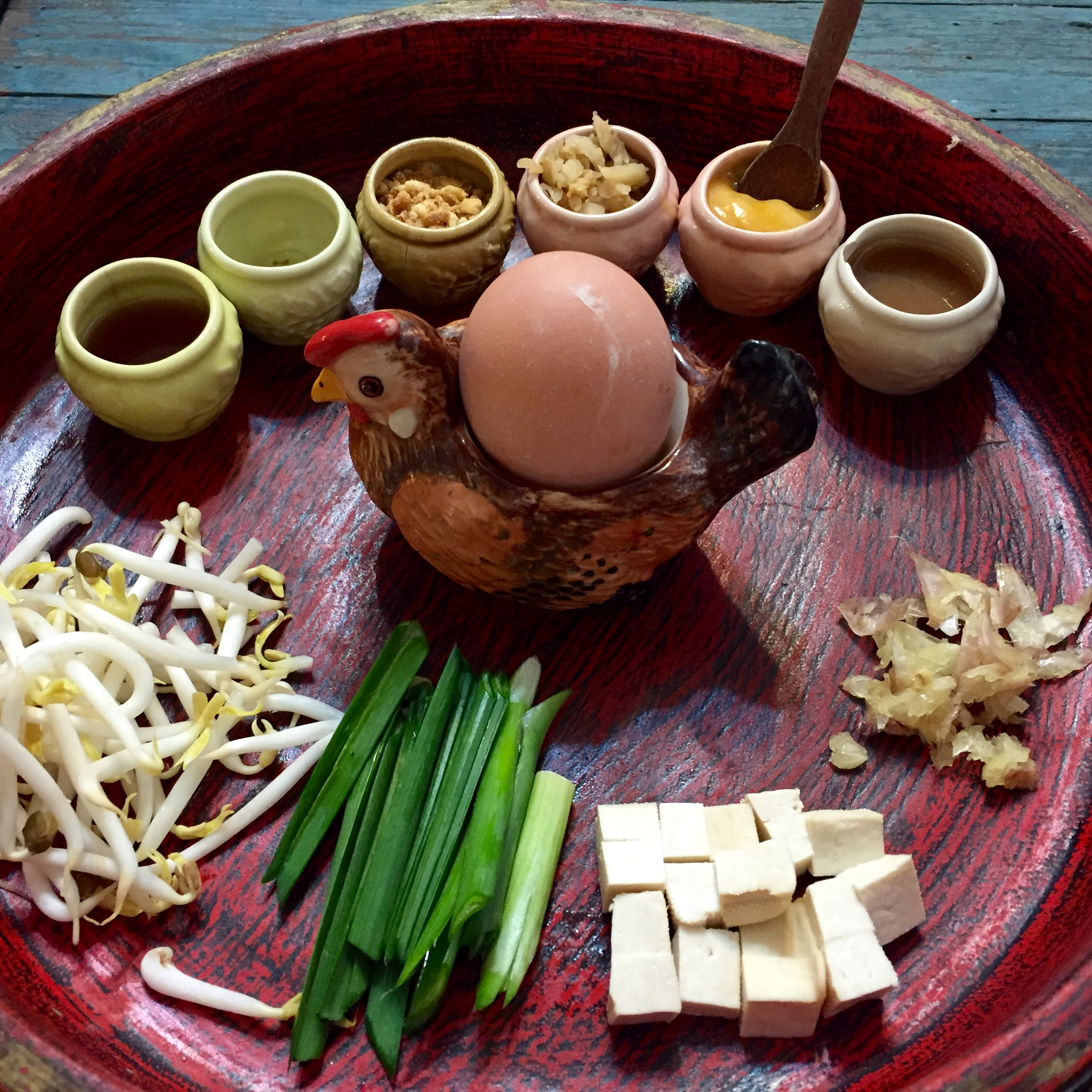
Ingredients for pad thai

Pad thai is made with rice noodles, which are stir fried with eggs and chopped firm tofu, flavored with tamarind juice, fish sauce, dried shrimp, garlic, shallots, and sometimes red chili pepper and palm sugar, and served with lime wedges and often crushed roasted peanuts. It may contain other vegetables like bean sprouts, green onions, garlic chives, preserved radish, and raw banana flowers. It may also contain fresh shrimp, crab, squid, or other fish or meat.

Many of the ingredients are provided on the side as condiments, such as red chili pepper, lime wedges, roasted peanuts, bean sprouts, garlic chives, and other miscellaneous fresh vegetables. Vegetarian versions may substitute the fish sauce with soy sauce and omit the shrimp entirely.

== See also ==
- Thai cuisine
- Tourism in Thailand
- List of noodle dishes
- Oyster omelette: a popular counterpart dish in Thailand
- Pad see ew
- Traditional food
- Mie aceh
- Mie goreng
- Char kway teow
- List of Thai dishes
