= Ipoh cuisine =

Food of Ipoh, Perak, Malaysia

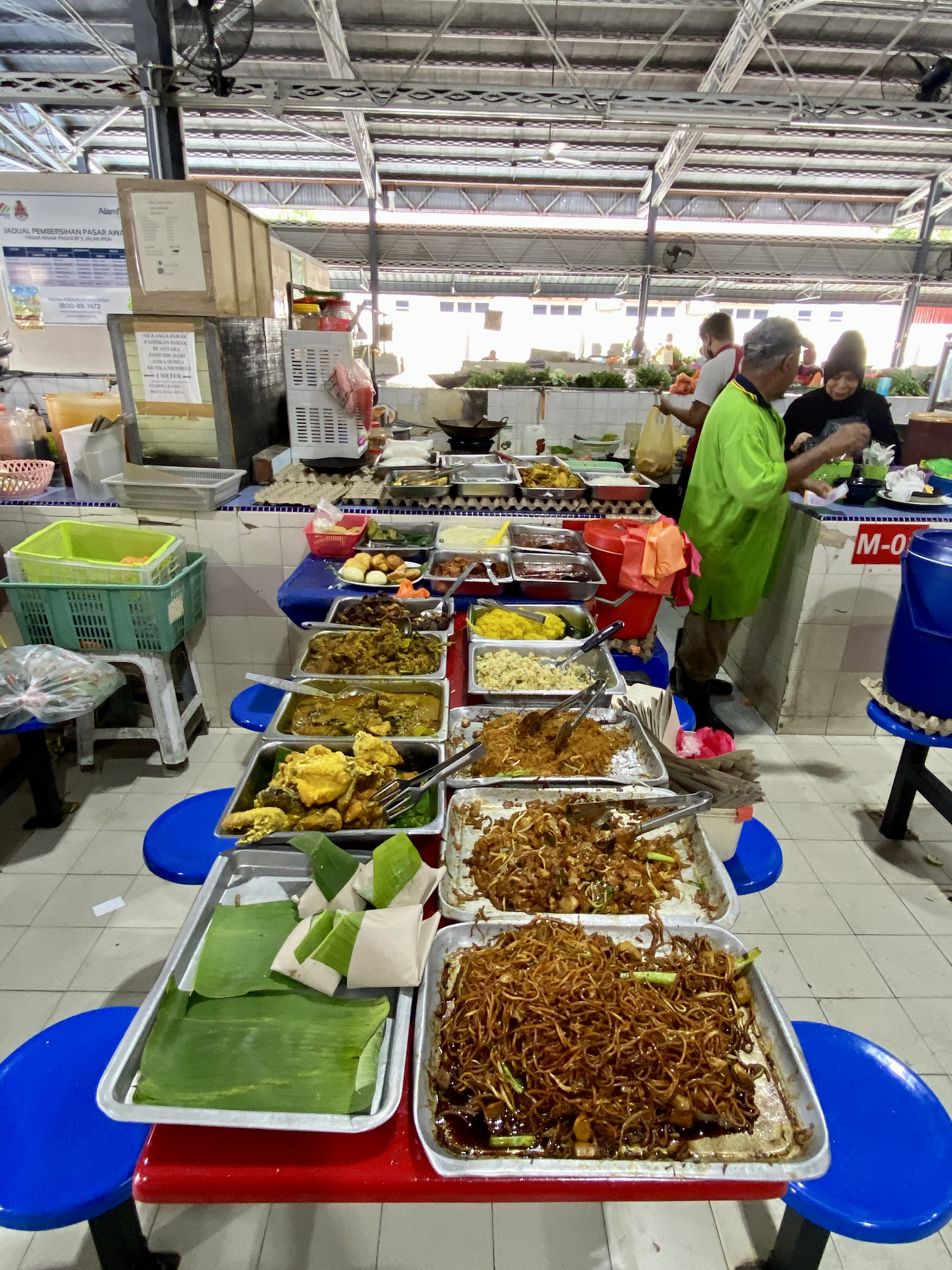
Food stalls in Ipoh.

Ipoh has a significant food scene with many hawker centres and restaurants. It has dishes derived from Malay, Chinese and Indian cuisine. In recent years, Ipoh has seen an increase in international restaurants, bars and gastropubs which have become popular with locals and tourists.

Its food culture is driven by its plurality Chinese population who are largely of Cantonese and Hakka descent. There is also Malay and Indian food in Ipoh; the nasi kandar served by a prominent local Mamak stall (in continuous operation since the 1950s) is nicknamed nasi ganja due to its supposed addictive properties. Specialty foods from neighbouring towns are also available in Ipoh.

Made from coffee beans specially roasted with palm oil margarine, Ipoh white coffee is arguably Ipoh's most famous export, and the drink is endemic to the Old Town of Ipoh.

== Dishes found in Ipoh ==
=== Savoury ===
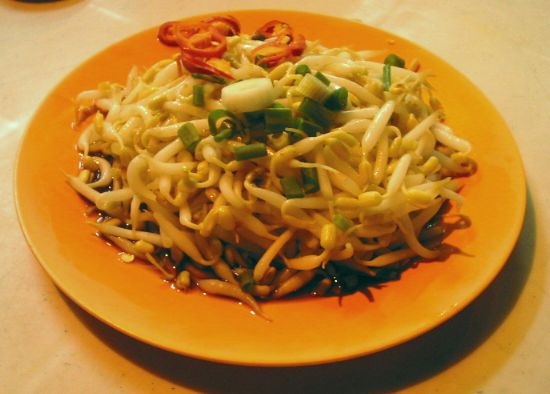
Ipoh's famous beansprouts, garnished with sliced chilli and chopped spring onions.

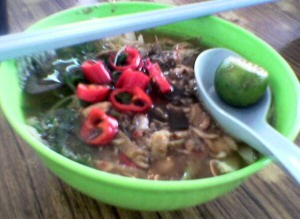
A bowl of Ipoh laksa

- Bean Sprouts Chicken (Chinese : 芽菜雞) – also known as nga choy kai or tauge ayam. It consists of chicken meat, chicken offal, and locally grown bean sprouts blanched in water and dressed with soy sauce and sesame oil.
- Beef brisket noodles (Chinese : 牛腩面) – Noodles, usually served on their own with a dark soy dressing, accompanied with stewed beef brisket cooked in the traditional Cantonese manner with white radish and selected spices in a clear broth.
- Chee cheong fun (Cantonese : 豬腸粉) – a popular breakfast item, this consists of large pieces of flat rice noodles (Shahe fen) rolled up and served with sweet or spicy sauce. Unlike the chee cheong fun in Kuala Lumpur, chee cheong fun in Ipoh is served with minced pork and mushroom sauce, preserved green chilli peppers, a sprinkle of deep-fried shallots and sesame seeds. Some eateries even serve chee cheong fun with a curried gravy.
- Claypot chicken rice (Chinese : 瓦煲鸡饭) – chicken rice served in a claypot, traditionally cooked with smouldering charcoal embers. Typical additions include salted fish and Chinese sausage (lap cheong). Bercham, a suburb in Ipoh is famous for claypot chicken rice.
- Curry chicken bread (Chinese : 咖喱面包鸡) – a bread or roll bowl filled with curry chicken. It is also known as Golden Pillow Bread. A speciality of the neighbouring suburb of Kampar and in Lukut, Port Dickson, Negeri Sembilan down south, it is now widely available in Ipoh.
- Curry Mee (Chinese : 咖喱面). A bowl of thin yellow noodles mixed with rice vermicelli (bee hoon) in a spicy curry soup enriched with coconut milk, and topped with tofu puffs, prawns, cuttlefish, chicken, long beans, cockles and mint leaves, with sambal served on the side.
- Dim sum (Chinese : 点心) – a Cantonese speciality widely enjoyed in Ipoh.
- Dry curry mee (Chinese : 干捞咖喱面) – blanched noodles tossed with soy sauce, then subsequently poured on with some curry gravy. Dry curry mee is usually accompanied by slices of shredded chicken, char siu, cockles, and sometimes siu yuk.
- Fish ball noodles (Chinese : 鱼丸面) – Noodles served with round, spherical bites of surimi steeped in a light broth on the side. Local variants may include tiny versions of fish balls (Chinese : 鱼丸仔), or the inclusion of sides like pork meatballs with cuttlefish bits and stuffed tofu skin rolls as accompaniments for the noodle soup. Another variant called hor hee (Chinese : 河嘻), which is the Teochew term for fish ball, is also found in certain eateries in Ipoh. Hor hee is a Teochew-style noodle soup, with small fish balls, sliced fish cakes, preserved vegetables (Chinese : 冬菜), bean sprouts or shredded lettuce, and savoury fish dumplings in a fish-based broth.
- Hakka Mee (Chinese: 客家面) – a simple dish of noodles topped with a minced pork gravy. It is based on an older recipe called Dabumian (Chinese : 大埔面); the name indicates its place of origin as Dabu County, the center of Hakka culture in mainland China.
- Ipoh laksa – laksa served in Ipoh is very similar to Penang-style assam laksa, differing only in the garnishes used.
- Hainanese chicken rice (Chinese : 海南雞饭) – a much-loved Chinese classic, found in modest hawker stalls as well as upmarket cafes and restaurants.
- Roti bakar – toasted bread
- Kaya toast – toast spread with butter and kaya, a sweet spread made from a base of coconut milk, eggs and sugar. Kaya toast (or roti bakar in Malay) is a popular breakfast staple and afternoon tea snack.
- Rendang – Perak has its own variants of rendang, the most well known being rendang tok. Rendang tok uses a liberal amount of dried milled spices and unlike many other rendang varieties found in Malaysia, it is much drier in comparison, with the gravy being greatly reduced from prolonged simmering until all that's left is merely a thick layer that coats and adheres onto each piece of meat. Rendang tok can be found in some eateries and restaurants in Ipoh, and is usually cooked with beef.
- Salt-baked Chicken (Chinese : 盐锔鸡)- This traditional Hakka dish is prepared by wrapping a whole chicken with grease paper together with salt and certain Chinese herbs and baked for several hours. With this cooking technique, the meat will not lose its tenderness and the essence of chicken can be preserved as well. The combination of salt and herbs gives the meat a unique flavor.
- Sar Hor Fun (Chinese : 沙河粉) – Ipoh is famous for its flat rice noodles, which is prepared with local unfiltered spring water. There are two varieties: Kai see hor fun (Chinese : 鸡丝河粉) is served in a clear chicken and prawn soup with chicken shreds, prawns and spring onions. Chau hor fun (Chinese : 炒河粉) is fried with a little dark gravy, as opposed to Penang char kway teow (炒粿条) which has no gravy but is fried with egg, prawns and cockles. It is also different from Cantonese-style wat tan ho (滑蛋河) which is completely immersed in clear, egg-starch gravy.
- Satay or sate – char grilled meat skewers served with peanut sauce. Satay served in Ipoh is similar to satay served elsewhere in Malaysia, but slightly on the sweet side and due to Ipoh's majority Chinese population, eateries offering satay made with pork are not uncommon.
- Sotong kangkung (Chinese : 魷魚蕹菜) – This is a dish of cuttlefish with kangkung and topped with a sweet and savoury sauce.
- Tempoyak is a popular Malay delicacy. It is durian flesh which is preserved by fermentation in an earthenware urn. Commonly eaten with chillis and other dishes; it is well known due to the popularity of its key ingredient, durian, among locals. It is also used as a primary flavouring for gulai or stews.
- Wonton Mee (Chinese : 雲吞面) – thin egg noodles with wonton dumplings (Chinese : 雲吞), choy sum, char siu and a side of pickled green chillies. The noodles are usually dressed with a dark soy sauce dressing, with boiled or deep-fried wonton dumplings as a topping or served on the side in a bowl of broth.
- Yau Zha Gwai (Chinese : 油炸鬼) is version of the traditional Chinese cruller. The dough is shaped like a pair of chopsticks stuck together, and the name itself amusingly translates into "greasy fried ghosts". A breakfast favourite, it can be eaten plain with coffee, spread with butter or kaya, or dipped into congee.
- Yong liew (Chinese : 酿料) – better known as yong tau foo (Chinese : 酿豆腐) in other Malaysian states. Items like brinjals, lady fingers, tofu puffs, tofu skin, bitter melon, chillies and are stuffed or mixed with a pork or fish meat paste, and are either deep fried or boiled and served in soup. A type of yam bean (commonly known as jicama) fritter (Chinese : 沙葛料), made with shredded yam bean and the aforementioned meat paste is usually offered alongside the stuffed items as well.

=== Desserts and pastries ===
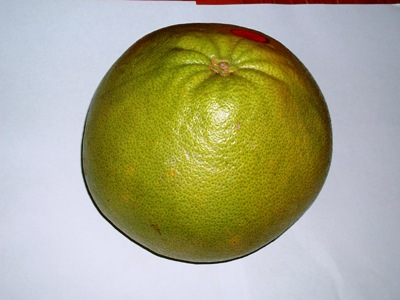
A pomelo

- Caramel custard – a classic dessert and a popular speciality served at some of Ipoh's most well regarded food establishments.
- Chicken Biscuit or kai zhai peng (Chinese : 雞仔餅) – a popular souvenir for tourists to Ipoh. Despite its namesake, the original version of this legendary biscuit contains no chicken. It is made from wheat flour, candied winter melon, lard, red bean curd, sesame seeds, molasses and egg wash.
- Egg tart (Chinese : 蛋挞) – several bakeries in Ipoh specialise in these Cantonese-style custard tart pastries.
- Heong Peng (Chinese : 香餅) – flaky biscuits with a sweet filling, and are often bought as souvenirs by tourists to Ipoh. Among locals, 'heong peng' is famous in the suburb of Gunung Rapat, which is purportedly the pioneer in their production.
- Ipoh white coffee (Chinese: 怡保白咖啡). A popular coffee drink which originated in Ipoh. Unlike the robust dark roast used for typical Malaysian-style black coffee ("Kopi-O"), "white" coffee is produced with only palm oil margarine and without any sugar and wheat, resulting in a significantly lighter roast. It is typically enriched with condensed milk prior to serving. This drink inspired the OldTown White Coffee restaurant chain, and instant beverage versions are widely available throughout Malaysia and even in international markets.
- Kacang putih or kacang puteh – originally from Buntong, kacang putih refer to a category of Indian snacks made of legumes, nuts or flour and many types of spices, roasted or fried to golden yellow.
- Kaya puff – pastries consisting of flaky pastry (akin to curry puffs) with coconut jam (kaya) filling.
- Kuih limas or kuih tepung pelita – a steamed confection wrapped in banana leaves which consists of two layers: the top layer is made with thick coconut milk, flour and a pinch of salt; the bottom layer consists of thin coconut milk with pandan paste, flour and sugar.
- Lempeng pisang – Malay-style pancake which consists of mashed bananas and grated coconut wrapped in banana leaves and char-grilled.
- Pomelo – Ipoh is famous for its fruits, such as seedless guava, cempedak, durians, and especially pomelos.
- Tau foo fah (Chinese : 豆腐花 or 豆花) – a velvety pudding of very soft silken tofu, traditionally flavoured with brown sugar syrup.
- Tong Sui (Chinese : 糖水) – sweet broths made with various permutations and combinations of ingredients, such as black beans, sea coconut, yam, sweet potato, longan and others. In Ipoh there is a whole row of hawker steels on one particular street dedicated to tong sui, called 糖水街 or Dessert Street.
