= Bean sprouts chicken =

Chicken dish with bean sprouts

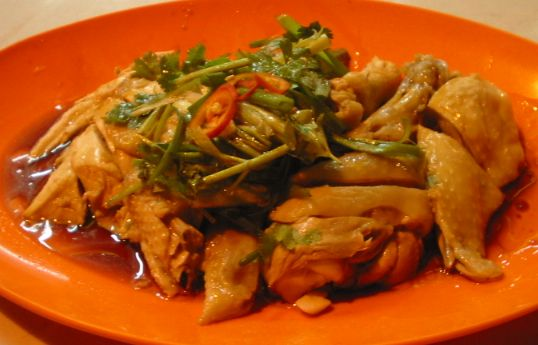
- Course: Main, usually for lunch and dinner
- Place of origin: Malaysia
- Region or state: Ipoh, Perak
- Main ingredients: Chicken, rice and mung bean sprout

Bean sprouts chicken (Simplified Chinese: 芽菜鸡, Hanyu Pinyin: Yácàijī; Jyutping: Ngaa2 coi3 gai1; Malay: Ayam tauge; Jawi: ايم تاوڬي) is a dish similar to the Hainanese chicken rice, the only difference being the dish comes with a plate of beansprouts. The steamed chicken is served with light soy sauce flavoured with oil.

People usually eat rice as an accompaniment; however sometimes people can also choose to accompany the chicken and bean sprout with a bowl of hor fun (Simplified Chinese: 河粉, Jyutping: ho2 fan2) clear chicken soup.

== Distribution ==
This dish can be found in Ipoh, Perak, Malaysia, where the bean sprouts are known to be crunchy and succulent, thanks to the hard water from the limestone hills in the surrounding Kinta Valley.

== See also ==
- Malaysian cuisine
  - Ipoh cuisine
- List of chicken dishes
