= Singapore-style noodles =

Cantonese stir-fried dish

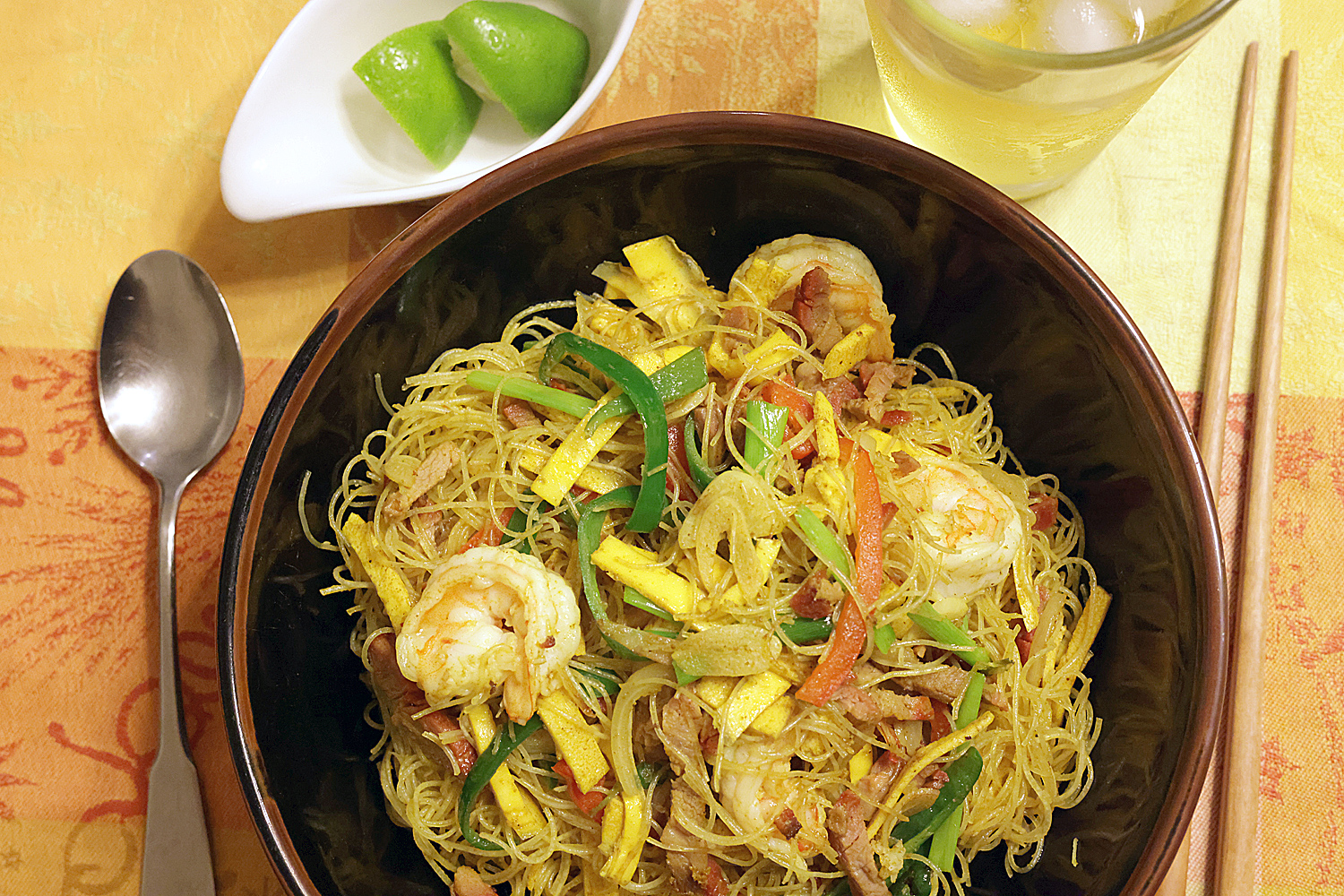
- Singapore-style noodles
- Type: Noodle
- Place of origin: Hong Kong
- Created by: Cantonese restaurants
- Main ingredients: Rice vermicelli, curry powder and turmeric, char siu and/or shrimp or chicken, red and green bell pepper, onion, garlic chives or green onions, bean sprouts, and topped with sesame
- Variations: vegetarian

Singapore-style noodles (Chinese: 星洲炒米; pinyin: xīngzhōu chǎomǐ; Jyutping: sing1 zau1 caau2 mai5; Cantonese Yale: Sīngjāu cháaumáih) is a dish of stir-fried cooked rice vermicelli, curry powder, vegetables, scrambled eggs and meat – most commonly char siu pork, prawn, and/or chicken.

Singapore-style noodles are a Cantonese creation, common in Cantonese-style and takeaway restaurants in Hong Kong. Despite its name, it is unrelated to Singapore, similar to how Swiss wing is unrelated to Switzerland. The dish dates back to just after World War II, having been developed by Cantonese chefs who wanted ways to use curry powder – which had been introduced through the British colonies.

== See also ==
- Char kway teow
- Mie goreng and mee goreng
- Otchahoi, a stir-fried noodle dish of Japanese origin, also associated with Singapore
- Currywurst, another dish created to use British-supplied curry powder
