= Sukhothai rice noodles =

Thai rice noodle dish

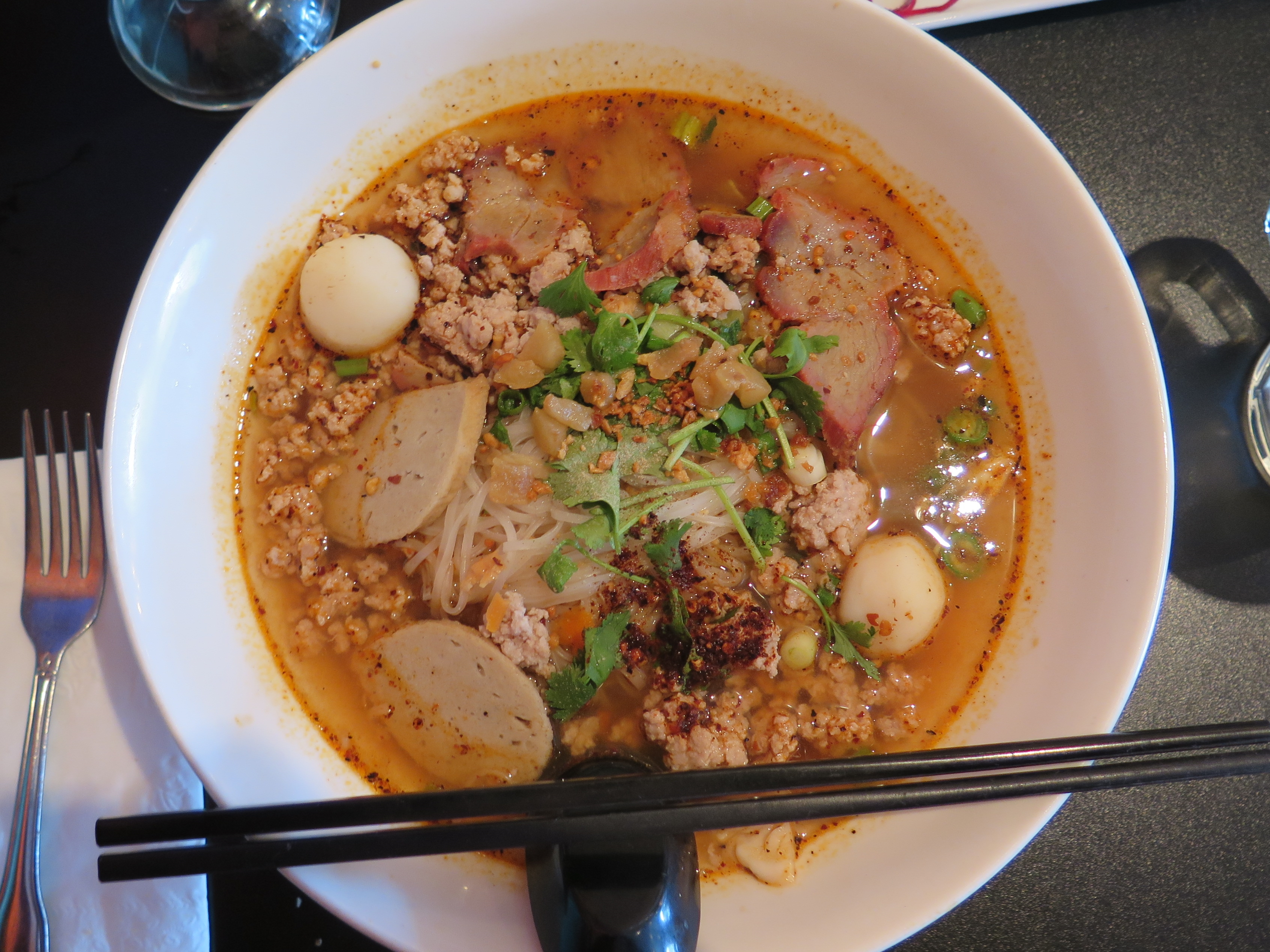
Sukhothai rice noodles

Sukhothai rice noodles (Thai: ก๋วยเตี๋ยวสุโขทัย, kuaitiao Sukhothai) is a style of rice noodle soup (kuai tiao) served in Thailand. It consists of rice noodles with stock and toppings, combining rice noodle which almost served with a thin type of noodle called “sen lek”. Sliced pork or sweet pork-based broth, ground pork and crackling are almost based on the topping. Thin sliced green beans, small pieces of salted turnip, ground peanut are the main ingredients. The taste is based on sweet mellow and smell of lime, dressing with fish sauce and ground chilli. Sukhothai rice noodles are usually served on their own or with a soup.

== History ==
Thailand has traded with the Chinese since the Sukhothai era by shipping the Celadon Sangkhalok Ware. According to the trading document, there was not a record of noodle until the Ayutthaya era. The reign of King Ramathibodi III (Narai), during 1656–1688) was the golden age of various foods. Due to the trading with many countries so not only exchanging goods, but also many types of food from other countries to Siam. Afterwards, Thais adapted those foods to suit their local ingredients and their tastes. The noodle also came along with the Chinese merchants, they cooked and shared it with others as the new dish which made people wanted to try this single dish that was easily cooked by just boiling noodle, adding meat, and pouring soup. At the present, Kuaytiew has adapted into many parts of Thailand. Locals call Sukhothai rice noodles “Kuaytiew-Thai”, but outsiders call them “Kuaytiew-Sukhothai”. The differences are ingredients, which consists of thinly sliced green beans, ground peanut and lime juice. Sukhothai rice noodles are similar to "Kamphaeng Phet" which is called ‘Kuaytiew Cha-Kung-Rao’. In the opposite way, Sukhothai rice noodles are topped with red slightly pork and Kamphaeng Phet's flavours by turnip and dried salted prawn. Also in Nakhonsithammarat's, the city of south Thailand, topping with streaky boiled pork and use the swamp cabbage instead of slight pork and thin-sliced green beans.

In Bangkok, Sukhothai rice noodles were first introduced at a shop called “Somsong Pochana,” located next to Wat Sangwet (Wat Sangwet Wittayaram) near the mouth of Khlong Bang Lamphu. The shop owner was Teacher Somsong, a schoolteacher at Wat Sangwet School, originally from Sawankhalok district, Sukhothai province.

Sukhothai rice noodles are different from typical noodles, which are based on Chinese cuisine. A clear distinction is the use of thinly sliced long beans instead of bean sprouts, which are commonly used in Chinese-style noodles. The flavor tends to be slightly sweet, whereas Chinese noodles are generally more plain or mild in taste. It is typically served with roasted pork, without fish balls, and topped with crushed roasted peanuts and lime juice, though it is not considered a tom yum-style dish. Because Thai people generally prefer slightly sweet flavors, this type of noodle became popular. Over time, it became widely known, and many other shops have since followed and adopted the style.

== See also ==
- List of noodle dishes
- Rice noodles
