= Otchahoi =

Local food in Shibata, Niigata, Japan

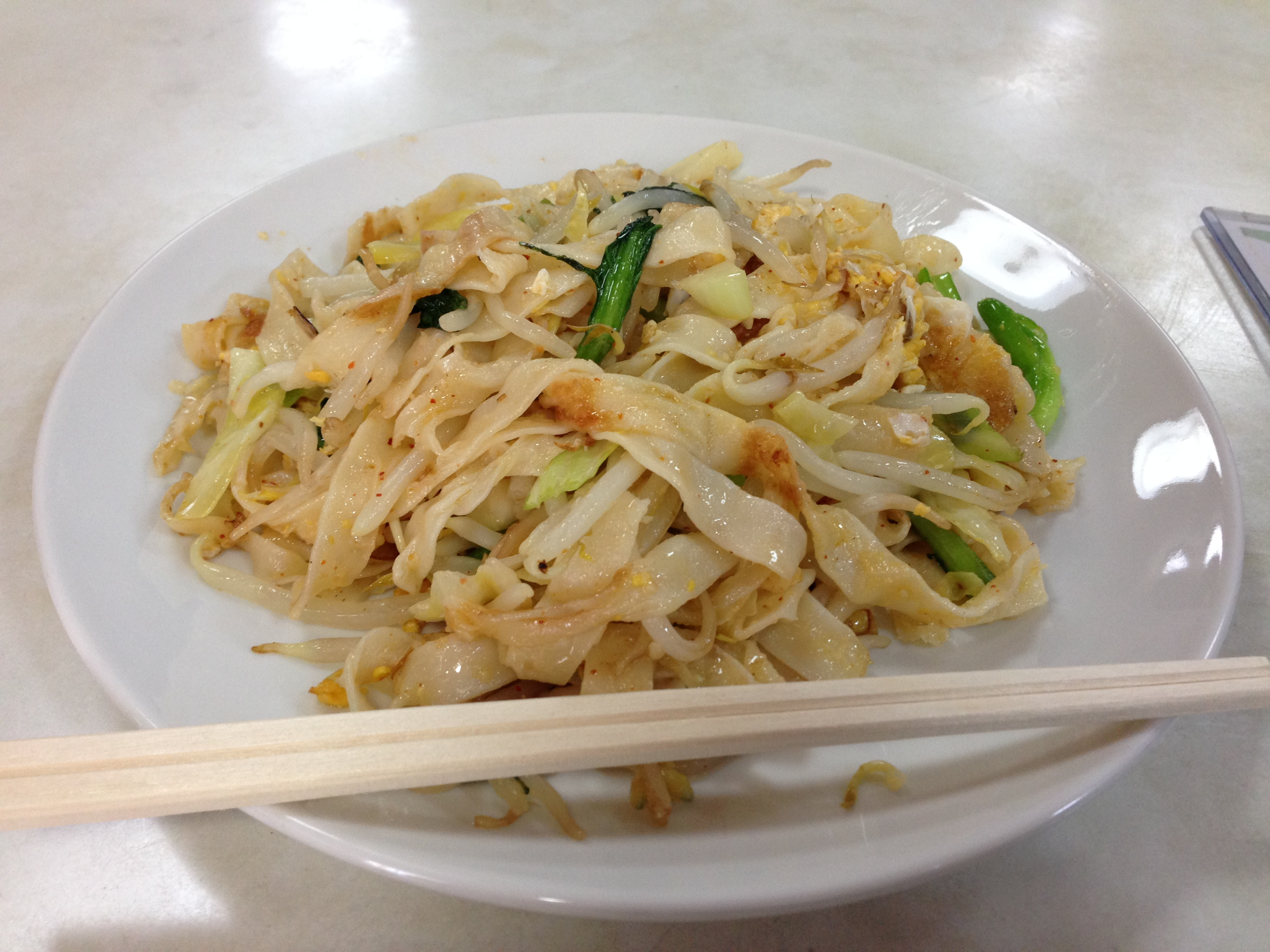
Sara otchahoi

Otchahoi (Japanese: オッチャホイ) is a noodle dish local to Shibata, Niigata, Japan. This dish was first introduced by a local restaurant called Singapore Shokudo (Japanese: シンガポール食堂). Although this dish is relatively unknown in Singapore, otchahoi is considered to be Singaporean cuisine by the Japanese.

== Description ==
Otchahoi is made by cooking flat noodles similar to kishimen together with bean sprouts, eggs, komatsuna and cabbage. There are two types of Otchahoi: sara otchahoi (Japanese: 皿オッチャホイ), which is made by stir-frying the ingredients in oil and seasoning with garlic and chili peppers, and shiru otchahoi (Japanese: 汁オッチャホイ), which is made without chili peppers and served in chicken and pork broth.

== History ==
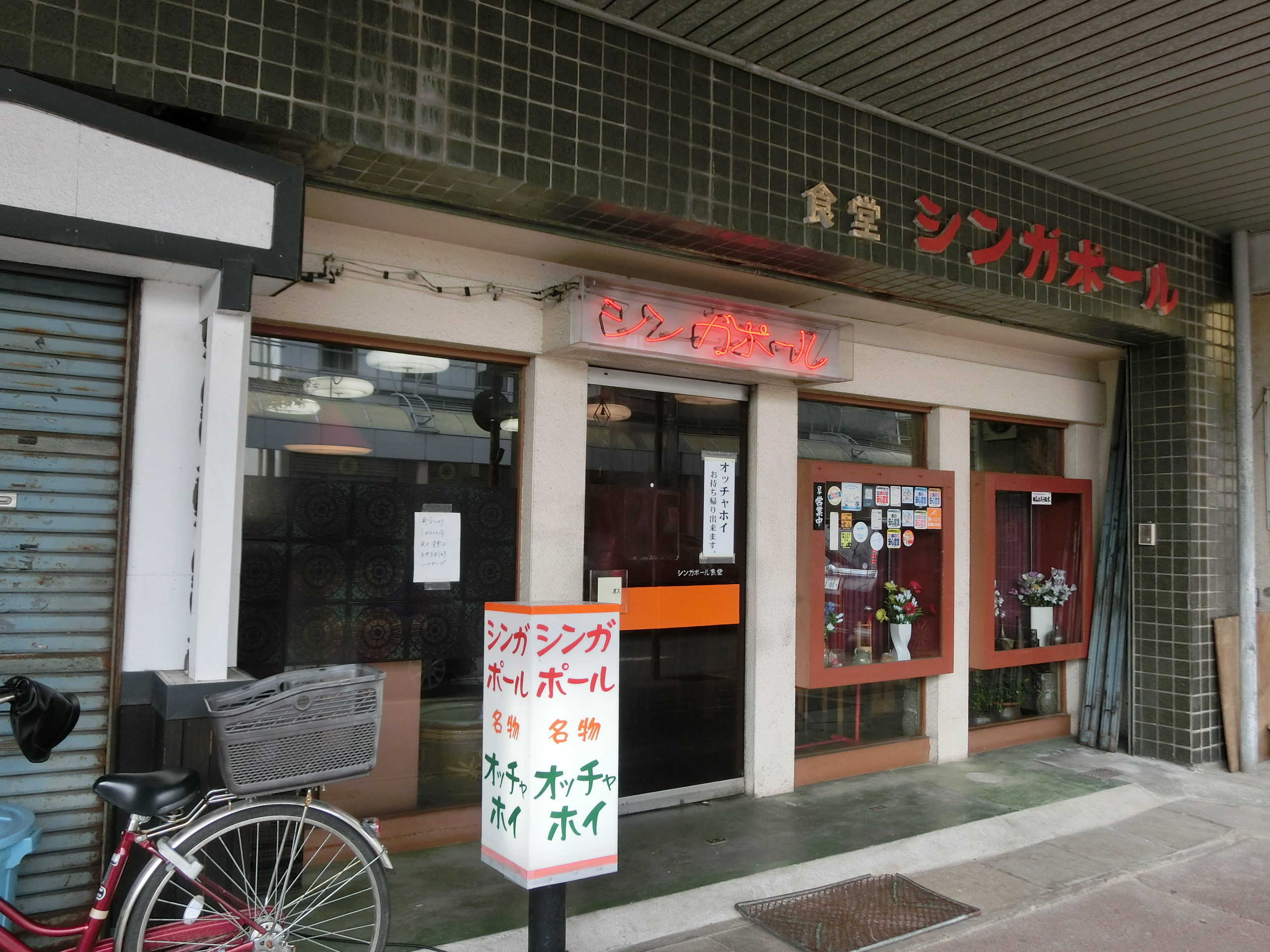
Singapore Shokudo

Otchahoi was created at the suggestion of the father of the founder of Singapore Shokudo, who ran a hotel for the Japanese people in Singapore. The founder was also born in Singapore and spent his childhood there. After World War II, he started a restaurant in Shibata in 1946. His father suggested adding otchahoi, a Singaporean dish that was his favorite, to the menu, and the founder recreated the taste of Singaporean street food, based on his father's memories. In the beginning, only Sara Otchahoi was available on the menu, and later Shiru Otchahoi was added.

=== Origin ===
Although otchahoi is widely recognised as a type of Singaporean cuisine, there is no exact dish in Singapore by this name, and it is unclear where the name otchahoi came from. The founder of the Singapore Shokudo had heard that his father had given it the name, but he did not know the origin of the name, and whenever he was asked about it, he would reply, "I don't know either".

Several Japanese people who lived in Singapore before World War II mention a dish called otchahoi. In the writings of Nishioka Kaori (Japanese: 西岡香織), who was involved in broadcasting for Nippon Broadcasting System and Fuji Television, otchahoi appears as a recollection of a Japanese person who once lived in Singapore. There is also a reference to otchahoi in the book Japanese Society in pre-war Singapore (Japanese: 戦前シンガポールの日本人社会), published by The Japanese Association, Singapore. In this book, the dish is described as "flat mee with starchy sauce." Another reference in the same book mentions that there was also a version with gravy sauce.

Japanese newspaper The Asahi Shimbun suggested that the dish may have originated from char kway teow, a dish that is indeed commonly eaten in Singapore and the surrounding countries, due to its similarity in taste and appearance. Asahi Shimbun also suggested the possibility that the name otchahoi may have been derived from Orchard Road, a district in Singapore. A writer Nanjo Takenori argued that the word may have originated from 炒燴 (chǎo huì).

== In popular culture ==
A game director Sakuma Akira visited Shibata in 2004, tried otchahoi there. In the game Momotaro Dentetsu, which he supervised, the otchahoi appears as one of the properties. and in the animated movie Uma Musume Pretty Derby: Beginning of a New Era, released in 2024, the topic of otchahoi appears in a scene where Dantsu Flame, one of the main characters, talks to Jungle Pocket, the main character.

== See also ==
- Char kway teow
- Mie goreng and mee goreng
- Singapore-style noodles, another dish commonly associated with Singaporean cuisine, in fact it was created in Hong Kong
