= YKKO =

Restaurant chain in Myanmar

Restaurant information
- Location: Yangon, Yangon Region, Myanmar
- Website: ykko.com.mm

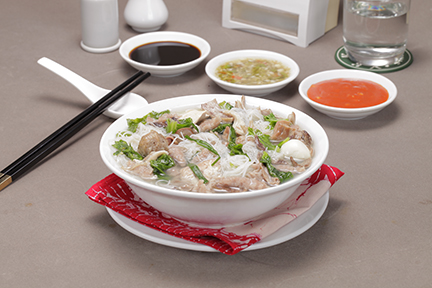
Kyay Oh from YKKO in Yangon

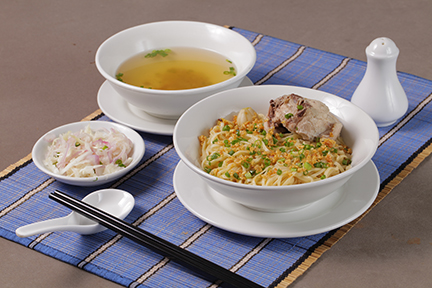
Sichet from YKKO in Yangon

YKKO (an abbreviation of Yan Kin Kyay Oh, from Burmese: ရန်ကင်းကြေးအိုး) is a restaurant chain in Myanmar specializing in kyay oh. The moniker comes from Yankin Township in Yangon, where the chain's first restaurant is located. Several YKKO restaurants exist in Yangon and a few in Bangkok, Thailand. The chain also offers Chinese food at its restaurants.

It was founded in 1988 in Yangon. As of 2018, YKKO has 35 shops across five cities in Myanmar.
