= Kuyteav =

Cambodian noodle soup

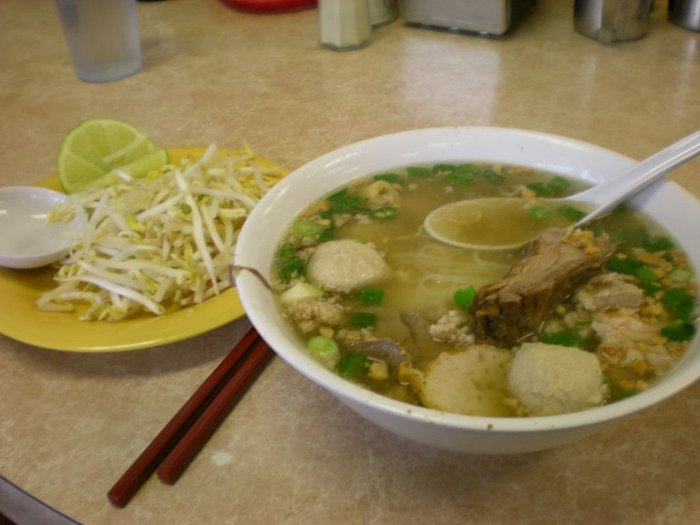
- Phnom Penh-style kuyteav
- Alternative names: Kuytiew, kuitiew, katiew
- Course: Breakfast, lunch, or dinner
- Place of origin: Cambodia
- Region or state: Southeast Asia
- Main ingredients: Rice noodles, pork stock
- Food energy (per serving): 1,466 kcal (6,130 kJ)
- Similar dishes: Hủ tiếu, kway teow, kuai tiao, kyay oh Pho

Kuyteav
- Chinese: 粿條
Transcriptions
Standard Mandarin
- Hanyu Pinyin: Guǒ Tiáo
Southern Min
- Hokkien POJ: Kóe-Tiâu

Khmer name
- Khmer: គុយទាវ UNGEGN: Kŭy Tiaw; ALA-LC: Guy Dāv; IPA: [kujtiəw]

Kuyteav (Khmer: គុយទាវ, Kŭy Tiaw [kujtiəw]) is a Cambodian noodle soup consisting of rice noodles with pork stock and toppings. It is a popular breakfast dish across all of Cambodia. The kuyteav can be found at marketplace stalls, roadside vendors, restaurants and in shophouses across the country, and is distinguished by its clear broth and array of herbs, aromatics and other garnishes and condiments.

== Etymology ==
The word kuyteav derives from the Teochew Chinese word 粿條 (peng'im: guê^{2}diao^{5}) and refers to cut noodles made from long-grain rice flour (as opposed to glutinous rice flour). This term also refers to the dish: a rice noodle soup with minced meat and various other toppings and seasonings.

In Khmer, kuyteav is properly pronounced as [kuj.tiəw] but is often elided to [kəˈtiəw] (romanized as k'téav, kătéav, katiĕv, kathiew, etc.) due to the sesquisyllabic nature of the Khmer language. The term has cognates in other countries in Southeast Asia where Chinese immigrants settled; with hủ tiếu in Vietnamese, kway teow in Malaysia and Singapore, kwetiau in Indonesian, and kuai tiao (ก๋วยเตี๋ยว) in Thai being analogues.

== Preparation ==
Kuyteav is prepared with partially dry thin squarish rice noodles cooked by quickly immersing the noodles in boiling water. The noodles are then strained, placed into a bowl, and moistened with nutty, caramelised garlic oil. After dressing with a sticky brown liquid made of oyster sauce, soy sauce and a pinch of sugar, the bowl is then filled with a clear broth made from pork bones, dried squid, and sugar, and seasoned with a bit of fish sauce. Then the meat toppings are added, which may include an assembly of different types of meat, such as pork loaf, minced pork, pork belly, duck, seafood or offal. Availability is the main factor in what toppings are used in kuyteav; some versions can be quite humble and basic, using only some ground pork and perhaps some dried shrimp for protein, while others can be more time-consuming and extravagant. Finally, when the dish is presented at the table, the diner may add several garnishes and aromatics to customise the dish by their preferences.

Moreover, kuyteav may be presented in one of two ways: with all the ingredients in the soup, or with the soup on the side. Both versions can have exactly the same ingredients but allow the diner to control the balance of flavours, spiciness and textures. When the dish is served this way (“dry” as opposed to “wet”) the dish takes on the appearance of a noodle salad. Finally, the Phnom Penh version of kuyteav is the most extravagant and features the most embellishments, owing to the city's historical wealth and importance. Kuyteav Phnom Penh may contain some or all of the following toppings: ground pork, sliced pork loin, pork belly, pork ribs, pig's blood jelly, pork liver, and other pork offal pieces, as well as prawns or shrimp.

== Consumption and culture ==
In Cambodia, kuyteav is still primarily a breakfast dish, and will typically be sold out by vendors before midday. As the pork broth is intended to be subtle rather than spicy, a plethora of optional herbs and other aromatics are always presented, allowing the diner to adjust the textures and flavours of the dish to their liking. In fact, in Cambodia, it is precisely the use of garnishes and condiments that defines the main flavour profile of the dish (garlic, limes and pepper are a common flavour trio in Cambodian cuisine), rather than the broth. The dish is served with garnishes that can include lettuce leaves, bean sprouts, fresh herbs (such as spring onions (scallions), sawtooth coriander and holy basil), crushed black Kampot pepper, lime juice, and caramelised garlic oil. Many types of chilli (fresh, dried, pickled) and chilli sauce are also normally present at the table, to either add into the broth or to be used as a dipping sauce for the meat toppings, as well as soy sauce, fish sauce and sugar. Kuyteav is also sometimes eaten with deep-fried breadsticks, similar to how the Cambodians would eat congee.

== See also ==
- Hủ tiếu
- Kway teow
- Kuai tiao
- Kyay oh
- Char kway teow
- Pho
