= Kyay oh =

Burmese noodle soup

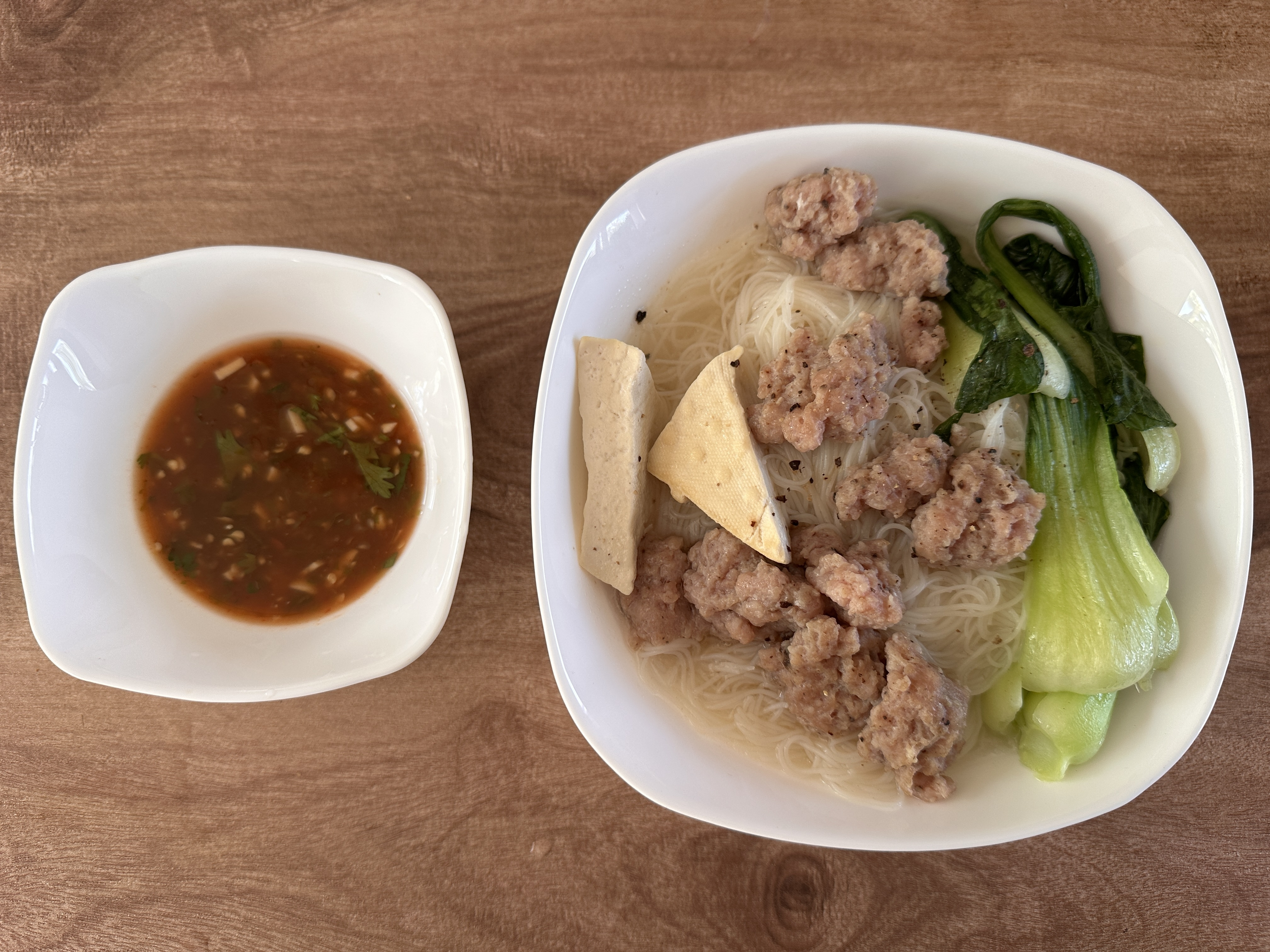
- Kyay oh
- Place of origin: Myanmar
- Associated cuisine: Burmese cuisine
- Main ingredients: rice vermicelli or flat rice noodles, marinated meat balls, pork broth
- Similar dishes: kuyteav, hủ tiếu

Kyay oh (Burmese: ကြေးအိုး; pronounced [t͡ɕéʔó]) is a noodle soup made with pork and egg in Burmese cuisine. Fish and chicken versions are also made as well as a "dry" version without broth. Kyay oh is traditionally served in a copper pot. Kyay oh is made with rice noodles (rice vermicelli or flat rice noodles) and marinated meatballs. The broth is made with pork or chicken. The pork version, the most popular, uses pork bones and intestine. Kyay oh is typically served with a tomato and green pepper sauce.

Dry kyay oh salad, called kyay oh sigyet (ကြေးအိုးဆီချက်), is made without broth and uses garlic oil. It is topped with spring onion and fried garlic sprinkles. The salad, like the soup, includes meatball, egg, pork brain, bok choy and triangular-shaped tofu or crispy meat dumplings. Other ingredients include salt, garlic, soy sauce and pepper.

The first kyay oh restaurant, Kyay Oh Bayin, was founded in 1968 in Rangoon (now Yangon). YKKO, founded in 1988, with 38 restaurants, is the most numerous of the kyay oh chains.
