= Hủ tiếu =

Vietnamese breakfast dish

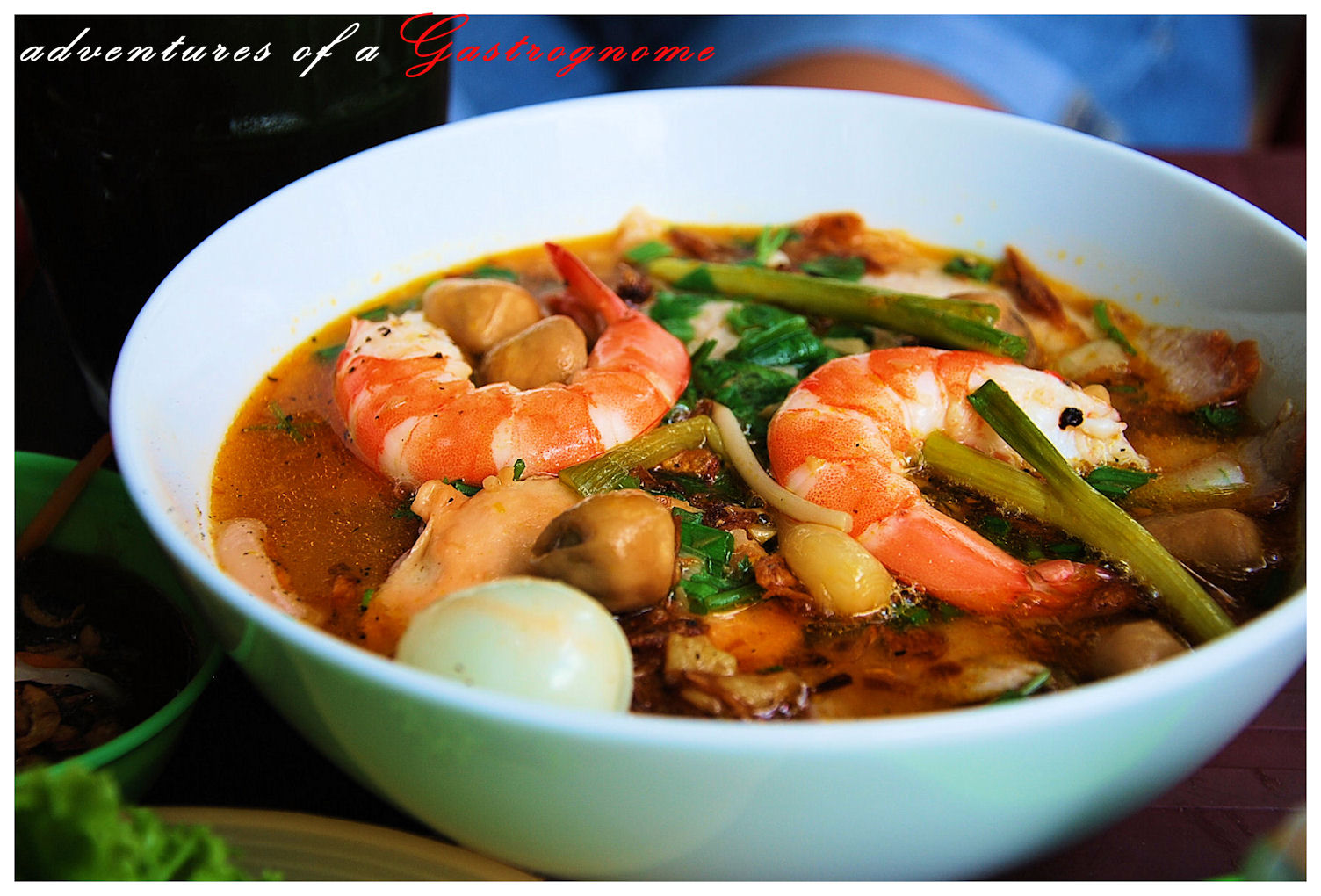
- Course: Breakfast, lunch, and dinner
- Place of origin: Vietnam
- Region or state: Southeast Asia
- Associated cuisine: Vietnamese
- Created by: Teochew
- Main ingredients: Rice hủ tiếu, beef, poultry, seafood, broth
- Similar dishes: Kuyteav, kyay oh, shahe fen

Hủ tiếu

Chinese name
- Chinese: 粿條
Transcriptions
Standard Mandarin
- Hanyu Pinyin: guǒ tiáo
Southern Min
- Hokkien POJ: guê2diao5

Vietnamese name
- Vietnamese alphabet: hủ tiếu

Hủ tiếu or Hủ tíu is a Vietnamese dish eaten in Vietnam as breakfast. It may be served either as a soup (hủ tiếu nước) or dry with no broth (hủ tiếu khô).

Hủ tiếu became popular in the 1960s in Southern Vietnam, especially in Saigon. The primary ingredients of this dish are pork bones, mixed with diverse kinds of noodles, herbs and other kind of meats.

Hủ tiếu was featured in Master Chef US 2013, where Gordon Ramsay mentioned it being on the top of his list and tasked the contestants to prepare a bowl of hủ tiếu. The noodle dish also appeared on the TV show Gordon's Great Escape in 2010-2011, where Ramsay tried the noodle dish in Cai Rang floating market in Can Tho.

== Origin ==
Hủ tiếu originated with the Teochew from Guangdong province in China who then emigrated to Vietnam. For the first version of Hủ tiếu, kuay teow, the rice noodles had a softer texture and flat appearance like Phở. Southern Vietnamese then recreated the noodles and produced a chewy texture for the rice noodle, the commonly seen texture for Hủ tiếu noodle nowadays. Hủ tiếu Nam Vang (lit. 'Phnom Penh rice noodle soup') is a variation of the dish.

The word hủ tiếu came from the Teochew dialect 粿條 (guê^{2}diou^{5} or kway teow).

== Ingredients ==
Hủ tiếu mainly consists of pork bone broth, noodles, and various types of toppings, including meat and other garnishes.

=== Noodles ===
There are different types of noodles for hủ tiếu, such as soft rice noodles, egg noodles, or chewy tapioca noodles. The tapioca noodles are chewier and more translucent and are used in hu tieu my tho, and they are called hủ tiếu dai (chewy hủ tiếu).

=== Broth ===
The broth is often made of pork bones, dried squid and dried shrimp. For hủ tiếu made in Southern Vietnam, the broth is made to be a little sweet to match with Southern Vietnamese's taste. Hu Tieu can be eaten dry (no broth), or wet (with broth), or the noodle dish can be served dry with a bowl of hot broth on the side.

=== Toppings ===
There are various types of toppings, such as sautéed ground pork, sliced pork liver, pork intestines, poached shrimps, Chinese celery and chives, sautéed garlic and shallots. Not all of these ingredients need to be present and one can switch or add toppings depending on their taste, making different hủ tiếu dishes such as hu tieu my tho which includes seafood.

=== Dipping sauce ===
The dipping sauces served with Hủ Tíu are soy sauce, black or red vinegar, shacha sauce, thinly sliced chili peppers, and chili garlic sauce. For Hủ Tíu Nam Vang (a Cambodian-style Hủ Tíu), there is also pickled garlic and minced garlic sauce.

== Variations ==
Popular varieties of hủ tiếu include:

- Hủ tiếu Nam Vang ("Hu tieu Phnom Penh") – comes from Phnom Penh-style kuyteav originally prepared at the city's Old Market
- Hủ tiếu sa tế ("Shacha hu tieu") – based on the Teochew dish
- Hủ tiếu Mỹ Tho – served on prawns, octopus, cuttlefish, and snails on thin, white rice noodles
- Hủ tiếu Sa Đéc – served on white rice noodles

Hủ tiếu gõ (gõ means knocking) is a street food version of hủ tiếu. It has this name because the vendors often travel around local areas on pushcart vehicles (xe đẩy) and announce themselves by knocking two metal bars together.

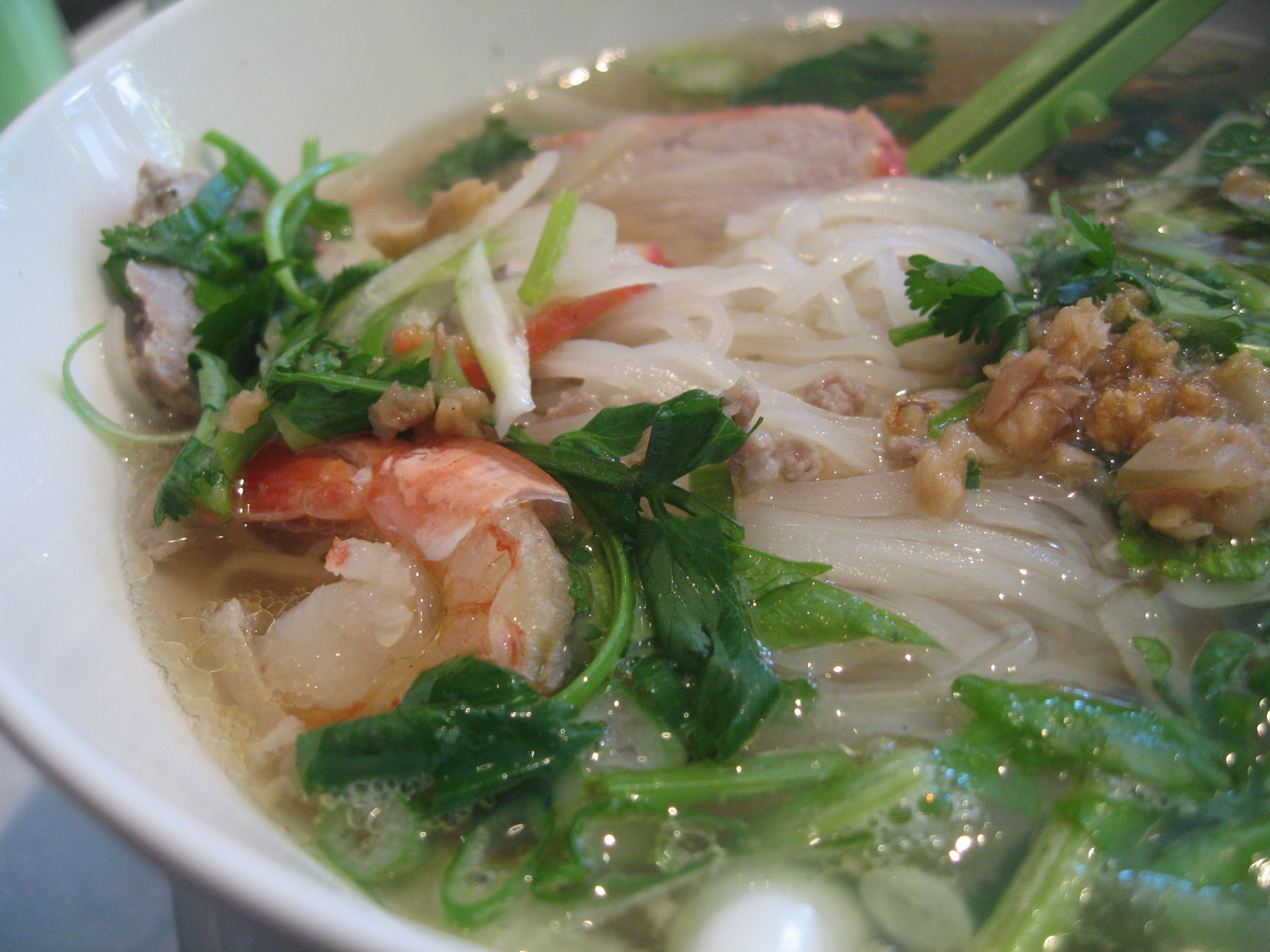
Hủ tiếu Nam Vang

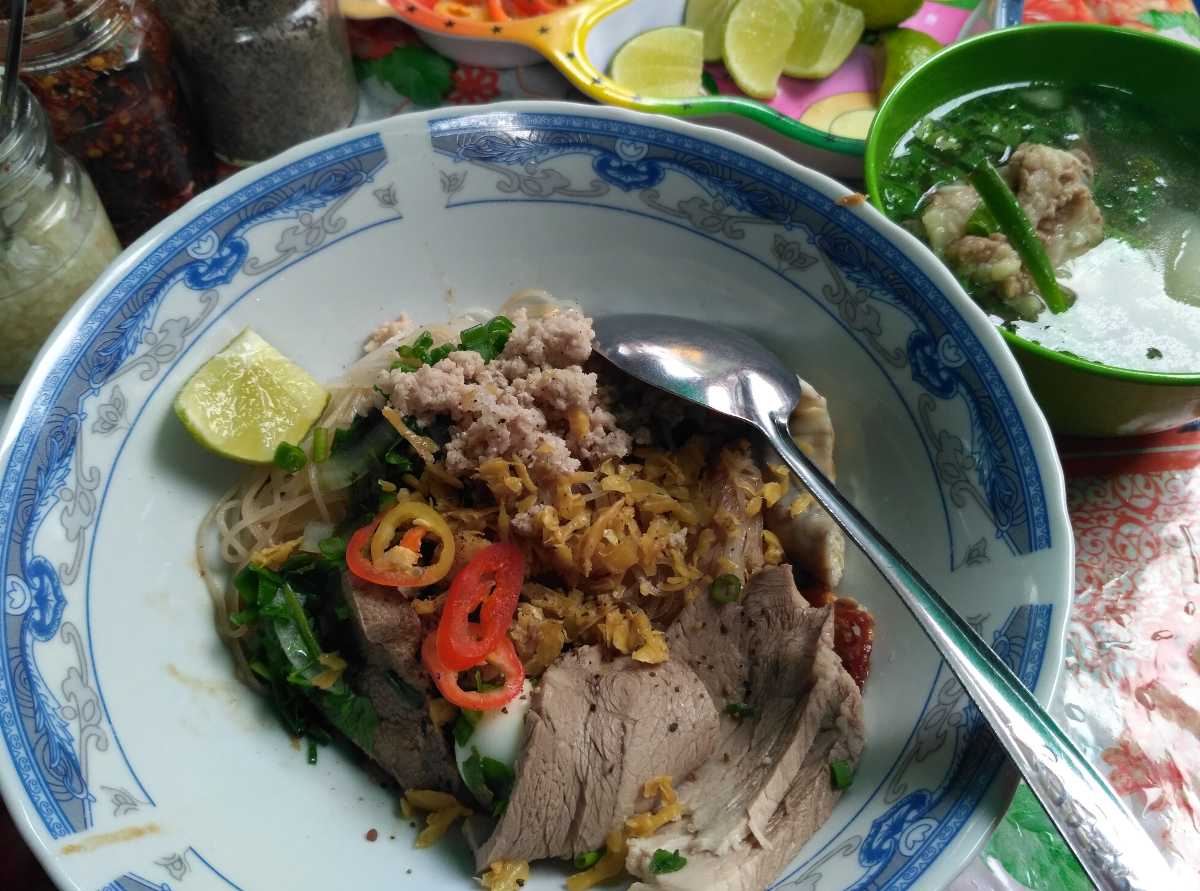
Hủ tiếu khô Nam Vang

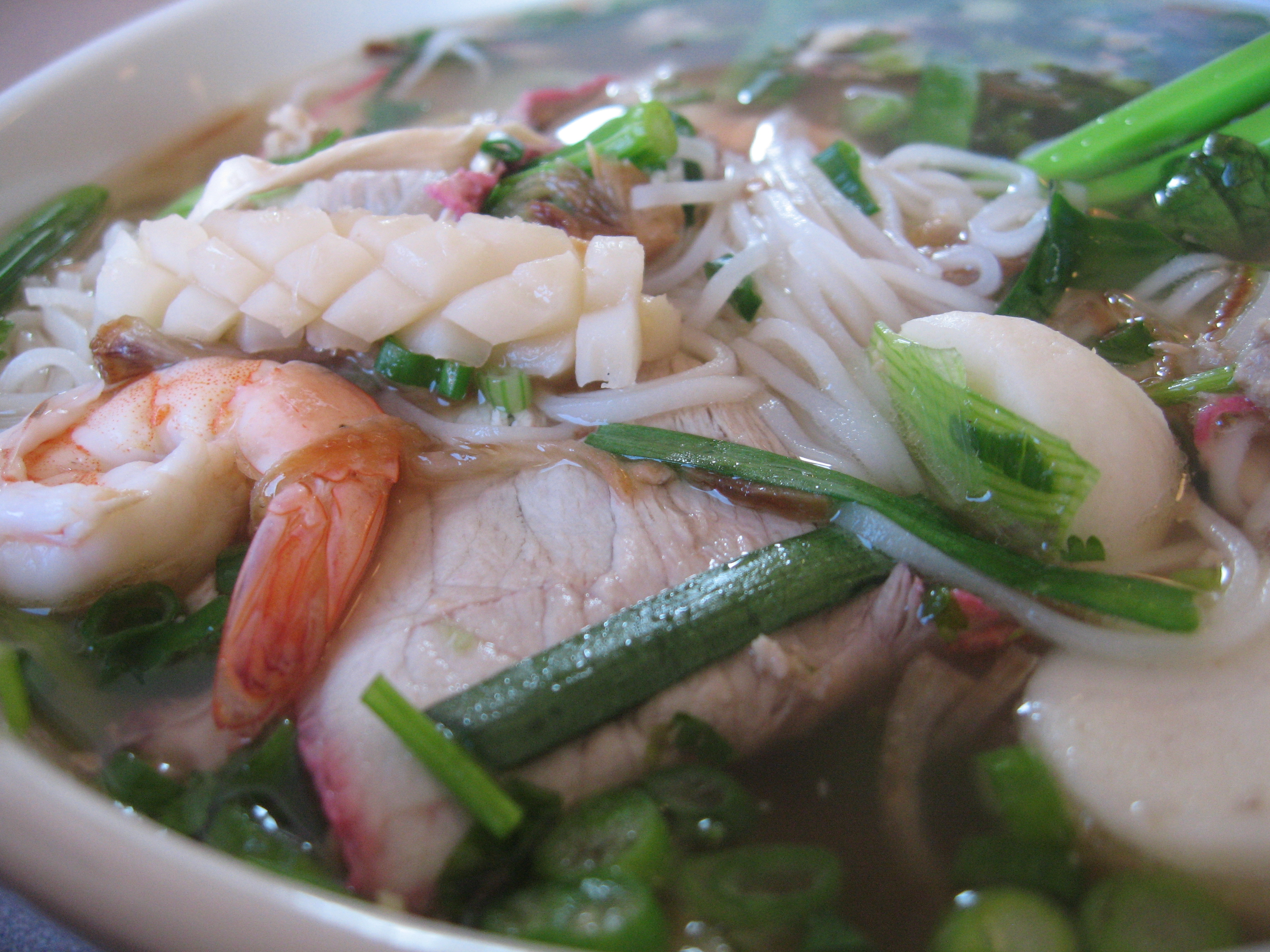
Hủ tiếu Mỹ Tho
