= Char kway teow =

Southeast Asian rice noodle dish

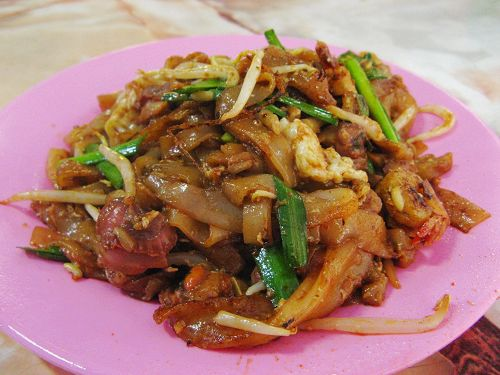
- Char kway teow at a hawker centre in Singapore
- Alternative names: Char kuey teow
- Type: Stir-fried noodle dish, Shahe fen
- Place of origin: Malaysia and Singapore
- Region or state: Maritime Southeast Asia
- Associated cuisine: Malaysia and Singapore
- Created by: Overseas Chinese laborers in Southeast Asia
- Main ingredients: Shahe fen, light and dark soy sauce, chili paste, belachan, whole prawns, deshelled blood cockles, bean sprouts, Chinese chives, Chinese sausage

Char kway teow
- Traditional Chinese: 炒粿條
- Simplified Chinese: 炒粿条
- Literal meaning: stir-fry ricecake strips (i.e. stir-fried ricecake strips)
Transcriptions
Standard Mandarin
- Hanyu Pinyin: chǎo guǒ tiáo
Yue: Cantonese
- Yale Romanization: cháau gwó tìuh
- Jyutping: caau2 gwo2 tiu4
Southern Min
- Hokkien POJ: chhá-kóe-tiâu
- Tâi-lô: tshá-kué-tiâu

Alternative name in Cantonese-speaking regions
- Traditional Chinese: 炒貴刁
- Simplified Chinese: 炒贵刁
- Literal meaning: transcription from the original name pronunciation in Hokkien (Min Nan)
Transcriptions
Standard Mandarin
- Hanyu Pinyin: chǎo guì diāo
Yue: Cantonese
- Yale Romanization: cháau gwai dīu
- Jyutping: caau2 gwai3 diu1

Char kway teow (sometimes also spelled as char kuey teow, Chinese: 炒粿條; Pe̍h-ōe-jī: chhá-kóe-tiâu) is a stir-fried rice noodle dish from Maritime Southeast Asia. In Hokkien and Teochew, char means 'stir-fried' and kway teow refers to flat rice noodles. It is made from flat rice noodles (Chinese: 河粉; pinyin: hé fěn; Cantonese Yale: hó fán) or kway teow (Chinese: 粿條; Pe̍h-ōe-jī: kóe-tiâu; pinyin: guǒ tiáo; Cantonese Yale: gwó tìuh) of approximately 1 cm in width, stir-fried over very high heat with garlic, light and dark soy sauce, chili paste, whole prawns, shelled blood cockles, chopped Chinese chives, slices of Chinese sausage, and bean sprouts. Other common ingredients include fishcake and belachan.

Originally developed and catered to Chinese labourers in the Southeast Asia region, the dish has achieved widespread popularity within the region from the late 20th century onwards, particularly in Malaysia and Singapore. The dish has also acquired a reputation of being unhealthy due to its high saturated fat content, as it is traditionally stir-fried in pork fat with crisp croutons of pork lard.

== History and etymology ==
The dish was often sold by fishermen, farmers and cockle-gatherers who doubled as char kway teow hawkers in the evening to supplement their income. The high fat content and low cost of the dish made it attractive to these people as it was a cheap source of energy and nutrients.

The term char kway teow is a transliteration of the Chinese characters 炒粿條 (in simplified Chinese 炒粿条). The dish's name is Hokkien (chhá-kóe-tiâu^{?}), but the dish may have its roots in Chaozhou in China's Guangdong province and is mostly associated with the Teochew. The word kóe-tiâu (literally meaning "ricecake strips") generally refers to flat rice noodles, which are the usual ingredient in Singapore and West Malaysia. There is no fixed way of spelling chhá-kóe-tiâu, and many variants can be found: examples include char kueh teow, char kuey teow, char koay teow, char kueh tiao, char kuay tiaw, char kueh tiaw and so on.

The dish is sometimes called kwetiau goreng or kuetiau goreng in Malay, which conveys the same meaning. In some regions of Indonesia, the dish is called mitiau goreng.

Owing to the dish's popularity and spread to Cantonese-speaking areas, the term char kway teow has been corrupted into 炒貴刁 (Cantonese Yale: cháau gwai dīu; pinyin: cháo guì diāo) when presented in the aforementioned areas. The term 貴刁 has no real meaning, but its pronunciation in Cantonese and Mandarin is similar to 粿條 in Min Nan.

== Variations ==
"Gourmet" versions of char kway teow, in which the dish may be prepared with more seafood, with crab meat and with duck eggs, may be found in major Malaysian cities like Ipoh and Penang. In Penang, char kway teow is commonly served on a piece of banana leaf on a plate, which is intended to enhance the aroma of the dish.

Char kway teow is a popular, inexpensive dish usually eaten for breakfast and sold at food stalls in Malaysia and Singapore. Blood cockles and prawns are standard fare in typical hawker preparations, while more expensive or luxurious versions incorporate cuttlefish, squid, and lobster meat. Singaporean style char kway teow mixes yellow wheat noodles with flat rice noodles. Some cooks prepare more health-conscious versions with extra vegetables and less oil.

Char kway teow prepared by Muslims in Malaysia and Singapore excludes lard and pork products, and may incorporate alternative ingredients like beef or chicken. Some versions by Malay cooks may emphasise the use of kerang (Malay for cockles) as a key ingredient, and it may be prepared with or without gravy.

Many Southeast Asian restaurants in Hong Kong offer char kway teow as an overseas specialty, although it is of Southeast Asian Chinese origin. The char kway teow offered in Chinese restaurants which serve Hong Kong-style Cantonese cuisine is an entirely different dish: stir-fried Chinese-style flat rice noodles with prawns, char siu, onions, and bean sprouts, seasoned with curry powder which renders it bright yellow in colour. In some places this is known as Fried "Good Dale", a transliteration of the characters "炒貴刁".

== Gallery ==
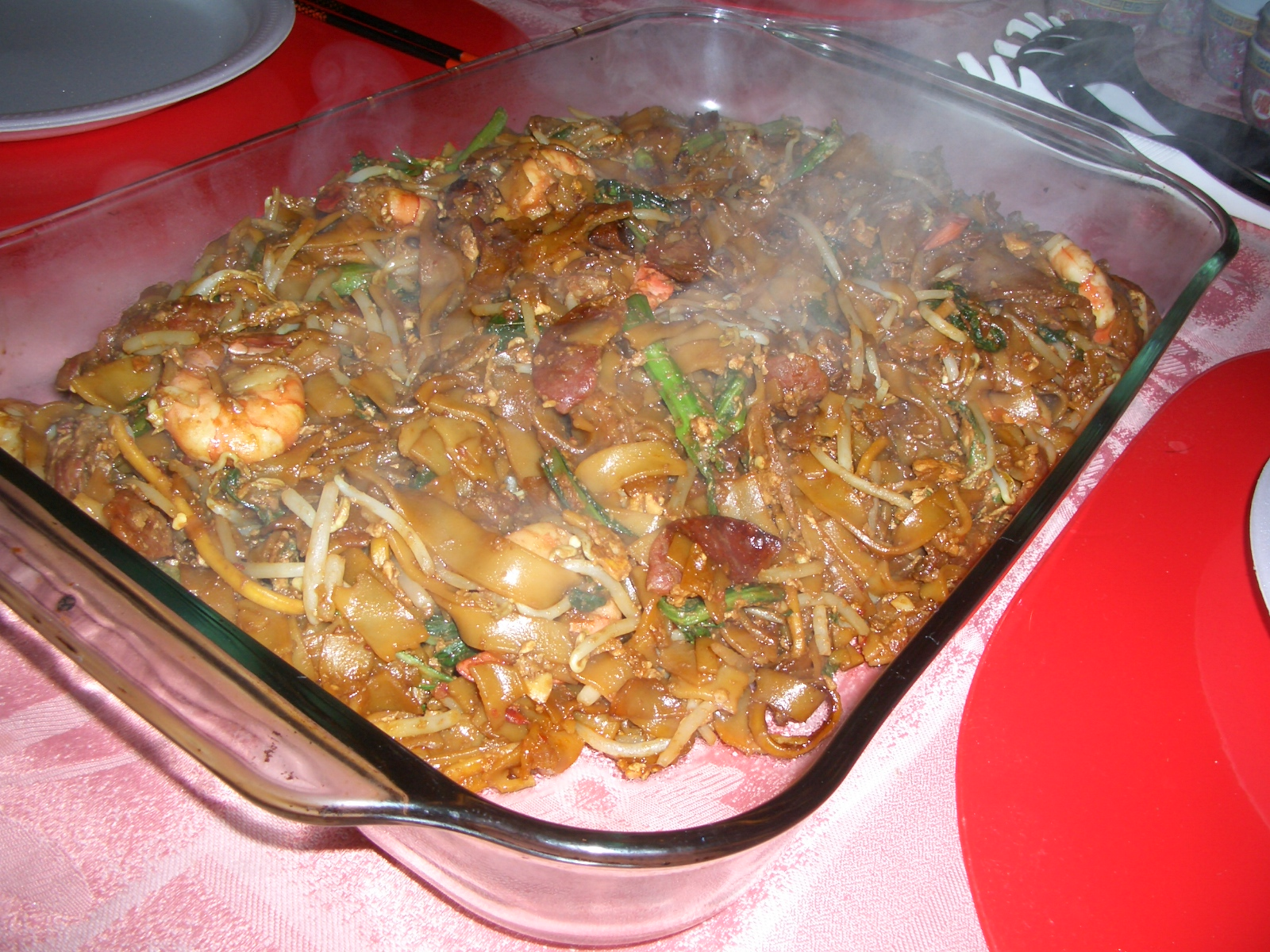
A large serving of char kway teow

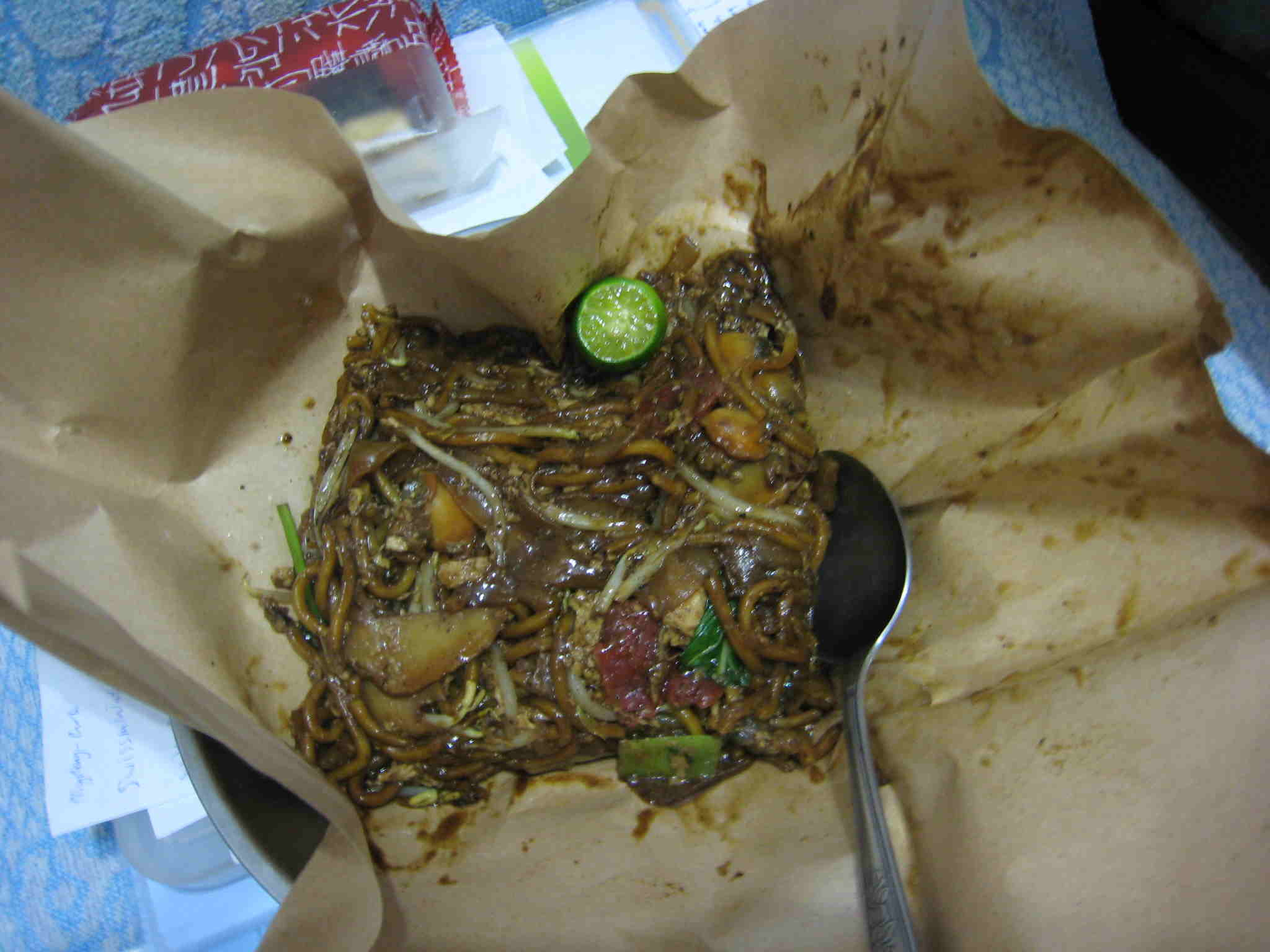
Singaporean-style char kway teow, cooked with a mixture of yellow wheat noodles and flat rice noodles

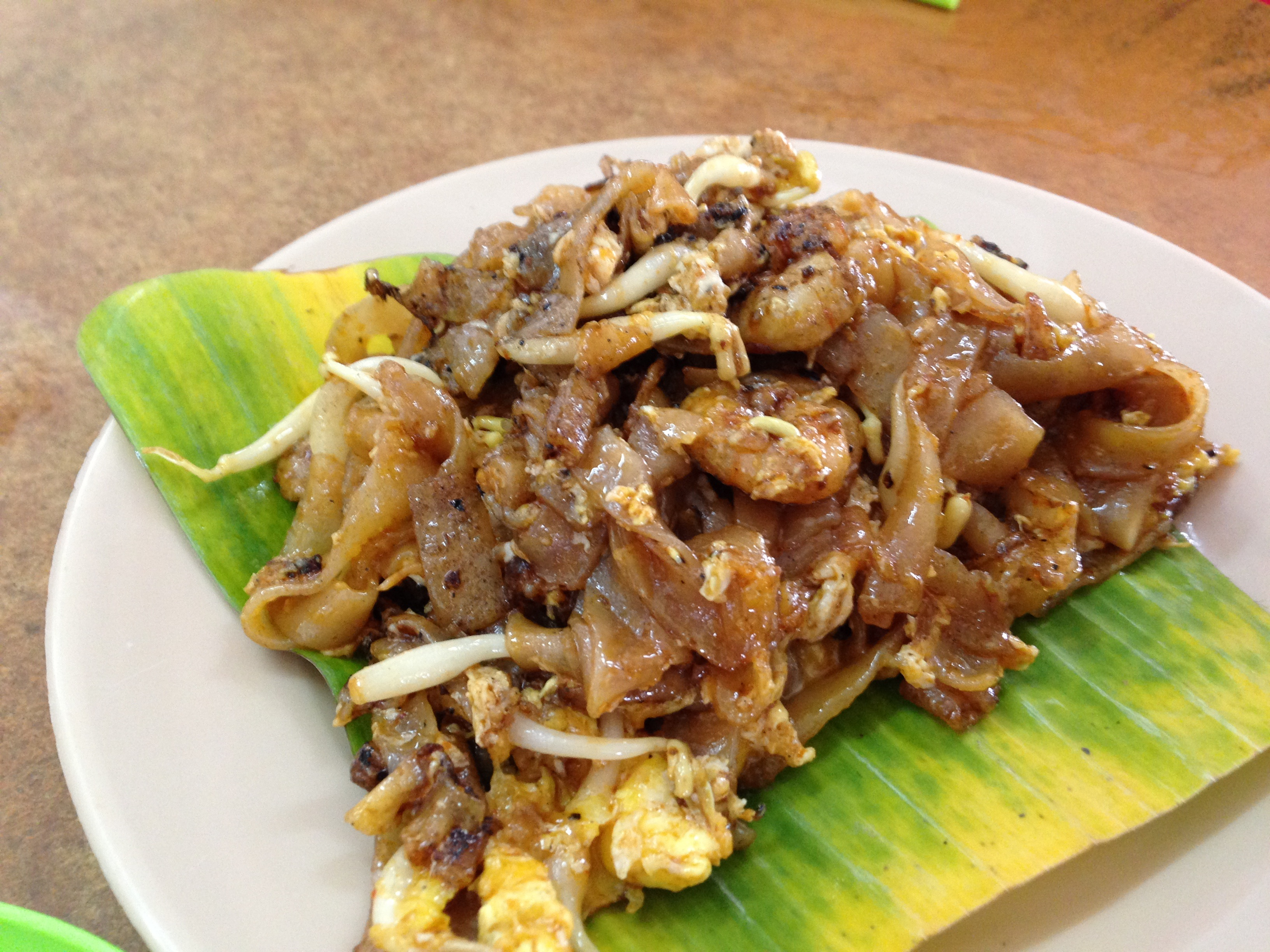
Penang-style char kway teow, here served on a piece of banana leaf

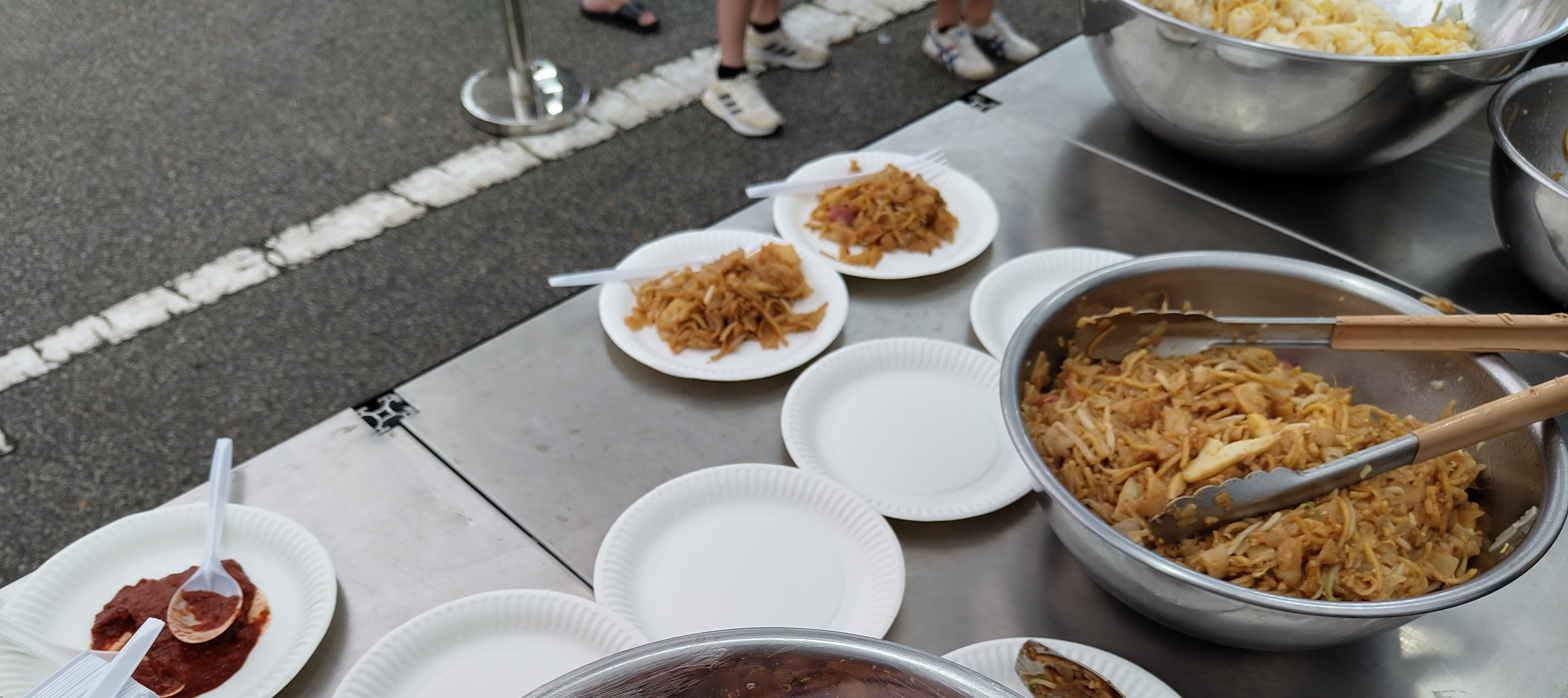
Small plates of char kway teow served at a Singapore carnival

== See also ==
- Beef chow fun
- Chinese noodles
- Mee goreng
- Mie goreng
- Otchahoi
- Pad thai
- Pad see ew
- Kuai tiao
