= Shahe fen =

Chinese noodle

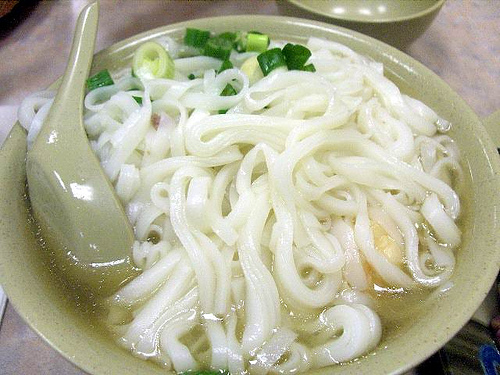
- A bowl of shahe fen
- Alternative names: Ho fun, hofoen, hor fun, sar hor fun, kway teow, guotiao, da fen, guay tiew sen yai, kwetiau
- Type: Chinese noodles
- Place of origin: China
- Region or state: Shahe District, Guangzhou
- Main ingredients: Rice
- Variations: Kuyteav, hủ tiếu, kyay oh

Shahe fen
- Chinese: 沙河粉
Transcriptions
Standard Mandarin
- Hanyu Pinyin: shā hé fěn
Hakka
- Romanization: sa ho fun
Yue: Cantonese
- Jyutping: saa1 ho4 fan2
Southern Min
- Hokkien POJ: sa-hô-hún

hefen
- Chinese: 河粉
Transcriptions
Standard Mandarin
- Hanyu Pinyin: hé fěn
Hakka
- Romanization: ho fun
Yue: Cantonese
- Jyutping: ho2 fan2
Southern Min
- Hokkien POJ: hô-hún

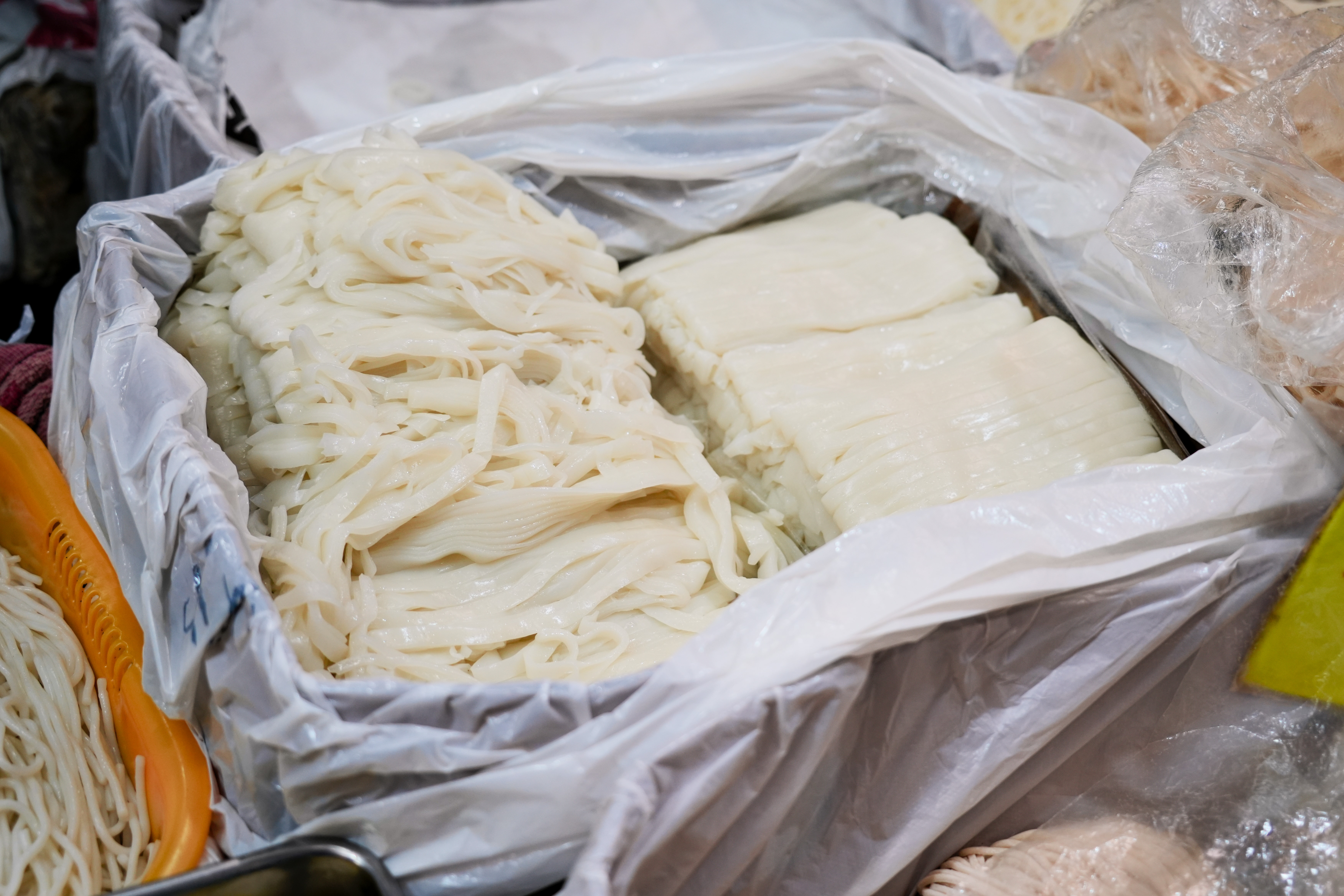
A box of uncooked shahe fen in a noodle shop in San Hui

Shahe fen (Chinese: 沙河粉; pinyin: shāhé fěn, also simply hor fun / he fen Chinese: 河粉) or guotiao (Chinese: 粿條; pinyin: guǒtiáo, also kway teow) is a type of wide Chinese noodle made from rice. It is often stir-fried with meat and/or vegetables in a dish called chao fen (炒粉; pinyin: chǎo fěn); it is also a main ingredient in char kway teow.

== Origin ==
Shahe fen is believed to have originated in the town of Shahe (Chinese: 沙河; pinyin: Shāhé; Jyutping: Saa1 Ho4), now part of the Tianhe District in the city of Guangzhou, in the southern Chinese province of Guangdong, whence their name derives. Shahe fen is a common component of southern Chinese cuisine, although similar noodles are also prepared and enjoyed in nearby Southeast Asian nations such as Cambodia, Vietnam, Thailand, Philippines, Malaysia, Indonesia and Singapore, all of which have sizeable Chinese populations.

== Names ==
=== Shahe fen ===
While shahe fen and he fen are transliterations based on Mandarin, there are numerous other transliterations based on Cantonese, which include ho fun, hofoen (a Dutch transliteration in Suriname), hor fun, sar hor fun, etc.

=== Guotiao ===
The word 粿條 guǒtiáo literally means "ricecake strips". It is also read in Minnan Chinese as kóe-tiâu; it is borrowed into the homophones kwetiau in Indonesia, kuetiau in Malaysian, and kway teow in Singapore. It is also called kuaitiao or guay tiew (ก๋วยเตี๋ยว) in Thailand, kuyteav (គុយទាវ) in Cambodia, and pan-tiau (粄條) by the Hakka.

=== Differences ===
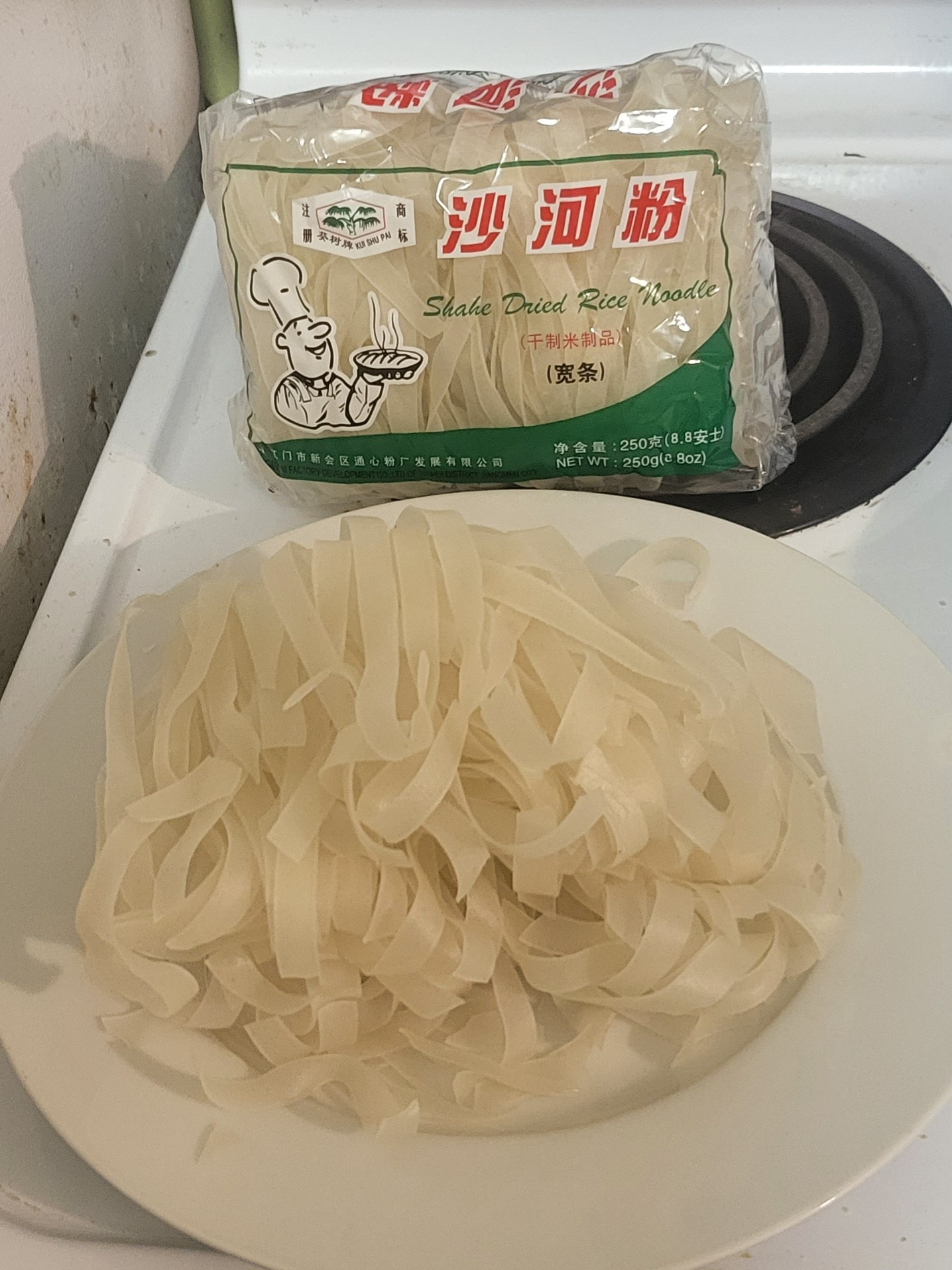
Dried shahe fen before cooking

Minnan people generally consider shahe fen and kway teow to be two distinct foods, and continue to make a distinction between shahe fen and guotiao/kway teow in their speech. Hor fun was developed by the Cantonese and is thin and tapered like strips of tape, with some porous areas that absorb the gravy, taste, and flavour of the broth or sauce that it is cooked in because it contains less starchy content, which has been stripped away during the production process. In contrast, guotiao/kuay teow is dense, and less absorbent and contains a higher level of starch and is more impermeable to absorbing flavours, and thus has to be soaked for a longer period of time in the dish preparation usually for a day or more, or is soaked in water first for a long time before it is fried as char kway teow. The taste, texture, flavour, ingredients, length, thickness, width, style, density are considered very different to many people in China and Asia more broadly, but often people from other regions are not be able to tell the difference immediately.

Guotiao/kway teow has a different origin from shahe fen, from Northeast instead of Central China, and is a modification of the guo/kway (rice cake) production process, and originated as the ancient preservation of rice as a starch-filled cake patty (of which Korean rice strips are yet another descendant, as it was brought as a recipe from China to Choseon dynasty when the Emperor of China during the Ming dynasty took the Korean princess as one of his concubines, and this recipe was gifted to the people of Choseon as a betrothal gift to the Korean people). In Hokkien (Fujian) of China, this version of guotiao/kway teow was then influenced by the Cantonese shahe fen from the neighboring province of Guangdong. Cantonese culture from the 17th century onwards was thought of as the dominant culture of civilization and culture, of wealth, excess, and sophistication, so the ancient guotiao/kway teow underwent modification to become similar to the standard Cantonese shahe fen/hor fun. However, these two versions (guotiao/kway teow vs. shahe fen/hor fun) were spread to Southeast Asia and the world differently, thus they are presented differently in different dishes. Though some restaurants will make a strong distinction, other, more casual Chinese restaurants may use the two interchangeably. Original ricecakes and its strips (i.e. authentic guotiao/kway teow) are stiff in texture, even after cooking, often making them less popular with modern consumers.

Another similar noodle is the mee tai mak (米苔目) which is like the hor fun and the bee hoon combined with Milanese pasta.

It is also known in Sabah as da fen (大粉), means "wide vermicelli", due to its similarity of colour and texture to rice vermicelli.

=== In other languages ===
Other names that are known include sen yai (เส้นใหญ่, lit. 'large rice noodles') in Thailand, hsan-bya (ဆန်ပြား, lit. 'flat rice') or nan-bya (နန်းပြား, lit. 'flat filigree') in Myanmar, and hủ tiếu or pho in Vietnam.

== Types ==
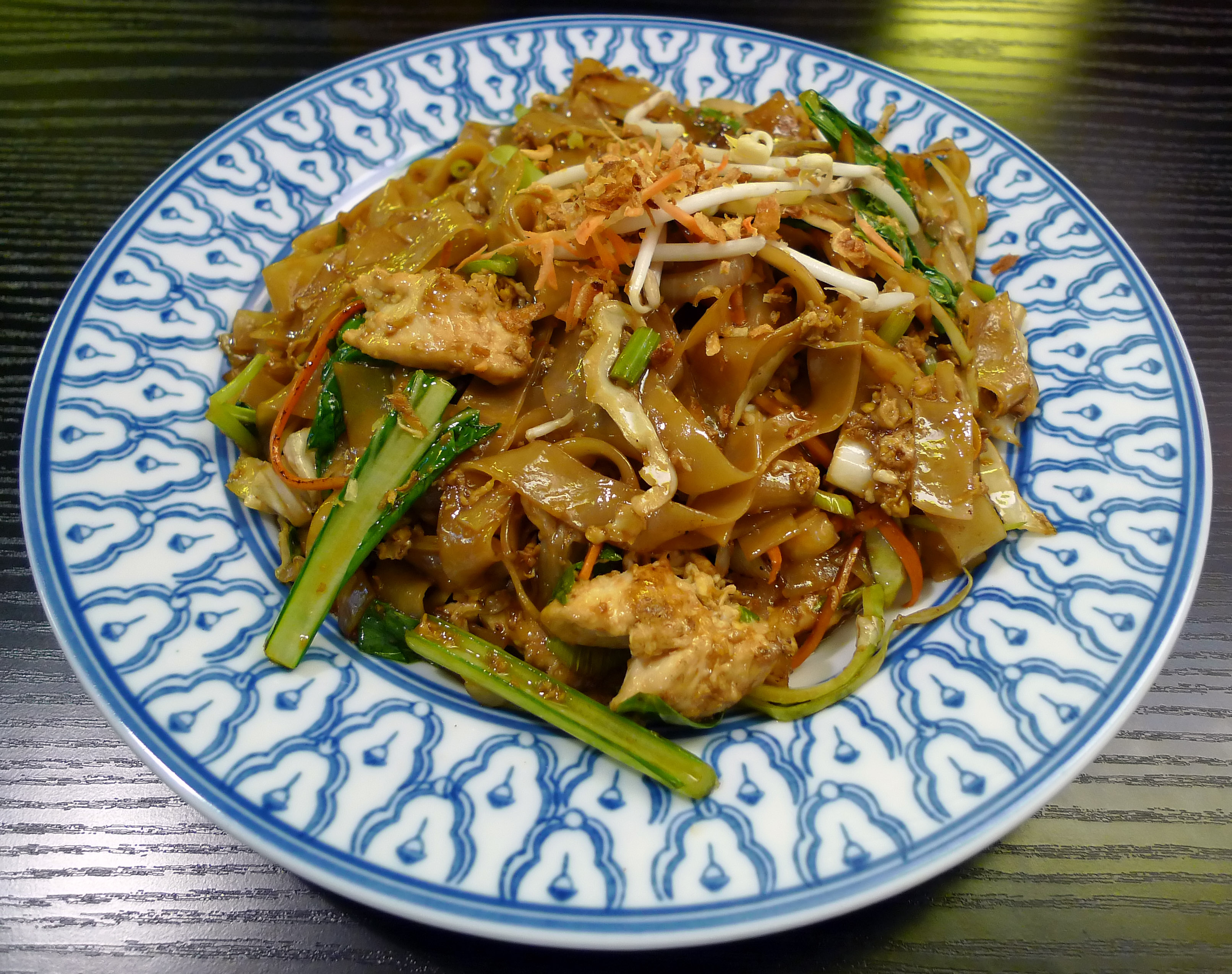
Wide shahe fen stir-fried with soy sauce, as served in Switzerland

Shahe fen noodles are white in color, broad, and somewhat slippery. Their texture is elastic and a bit chewy. They do not freeze or dry well and are thus generally (where available) purchased fresh, in strips or sheets that may be cut to the desired width. Where fresh noodles are not available, they may also be purchased packaged in dried form, in various widths.

Shahe fen noodles are very similar to Vietnamese bánh phở noodles, which are likely derived from their Chinese counterpart. Although the phở noodles used in soups may vary in width, wide phở noodles are also common in stir fried dishes. The popular Thai dishes phat si-io and drunken noodles are also made with similar noodles.

== Chao fen ==
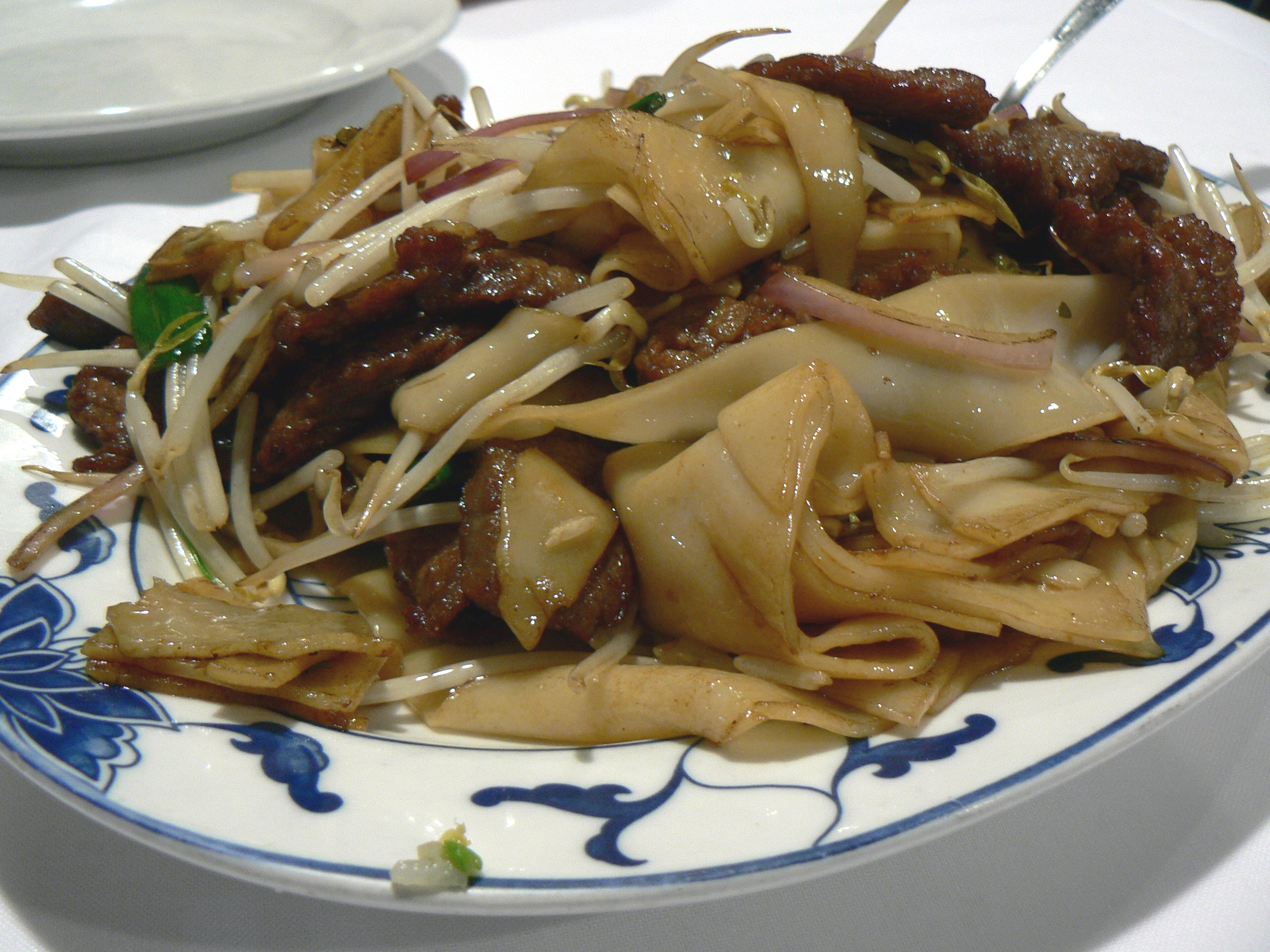
Beef chow fun

Shahe fen is often stir-fried with meat and vegetables in a dish called chao fen (炒粉; pinyin: chǎo fěn; jyutping: caau2 fan2). While chao fen is a transliteration of Mandarin, chow fun is the name most often given to the dish in Chinese restaurants in North America from Cantonese.

== See also ==
- Chee cheong fun
- Fettuccine
- Fried noodles
- Kuyteav
- Kwetiau goreng
- Phở
- Rice noodle roll
- Rice noodles

== Gallery ==
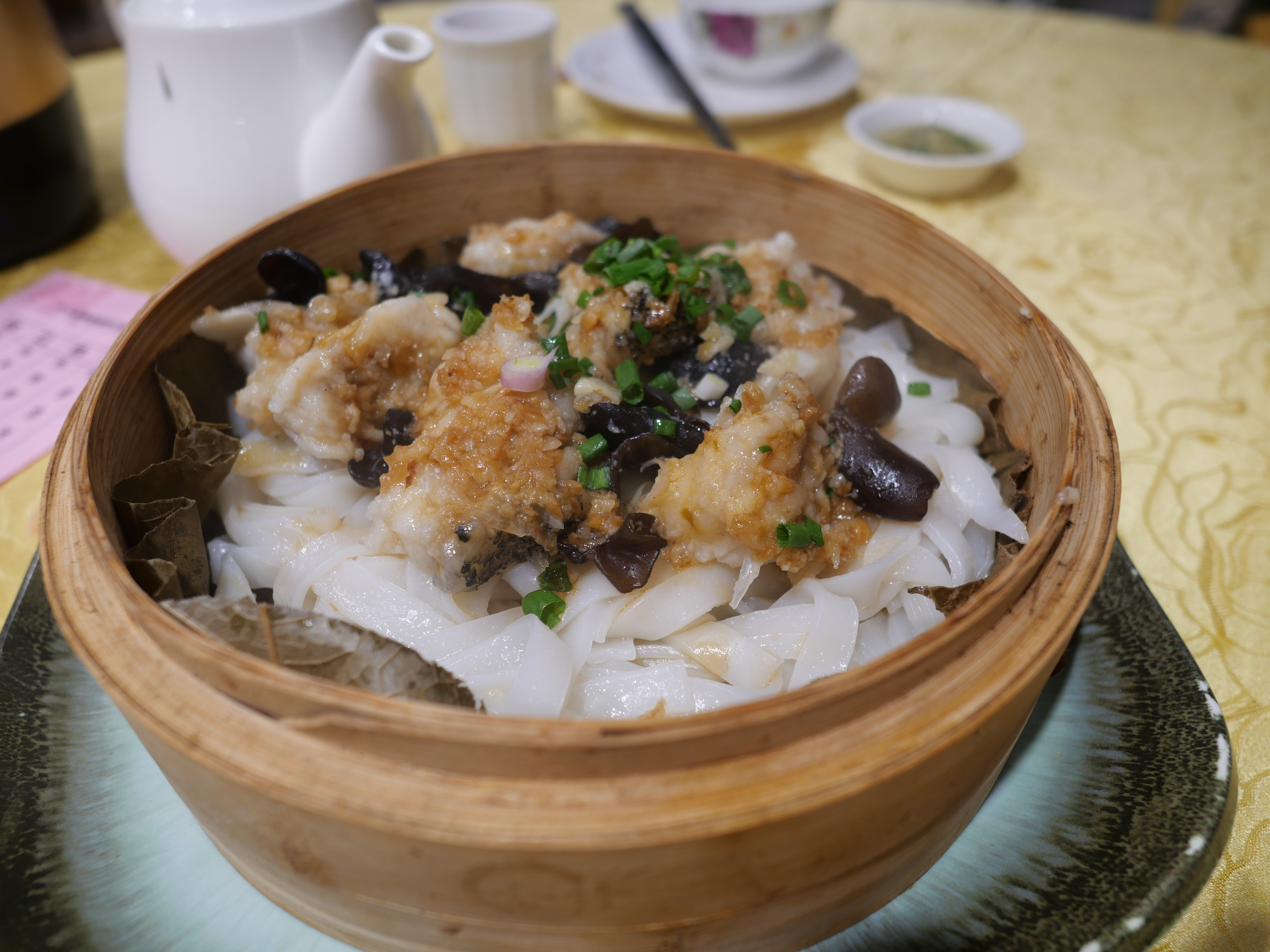
Steam Shahe Fen with Fish

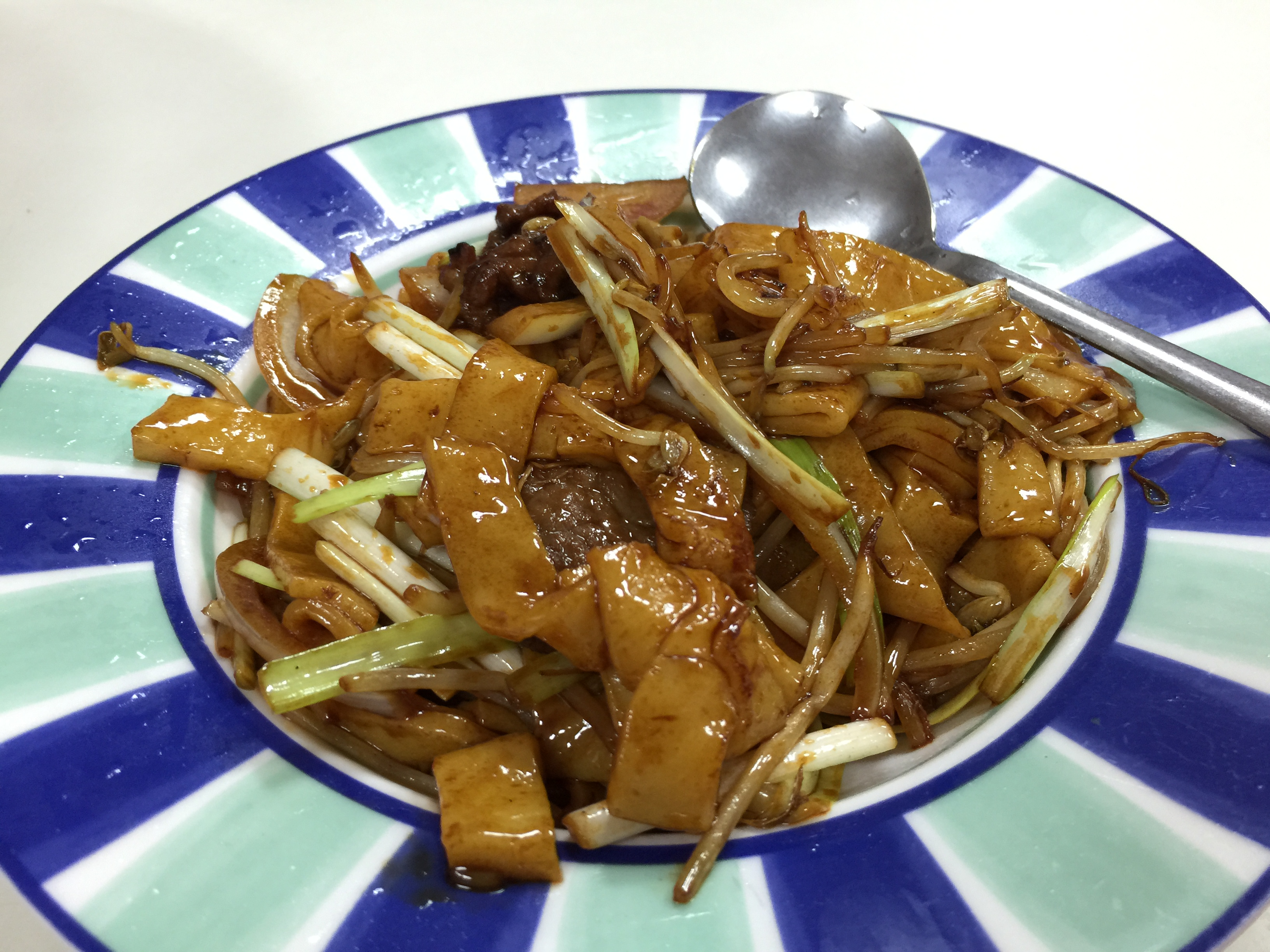
Fried Shahe Fen with beef

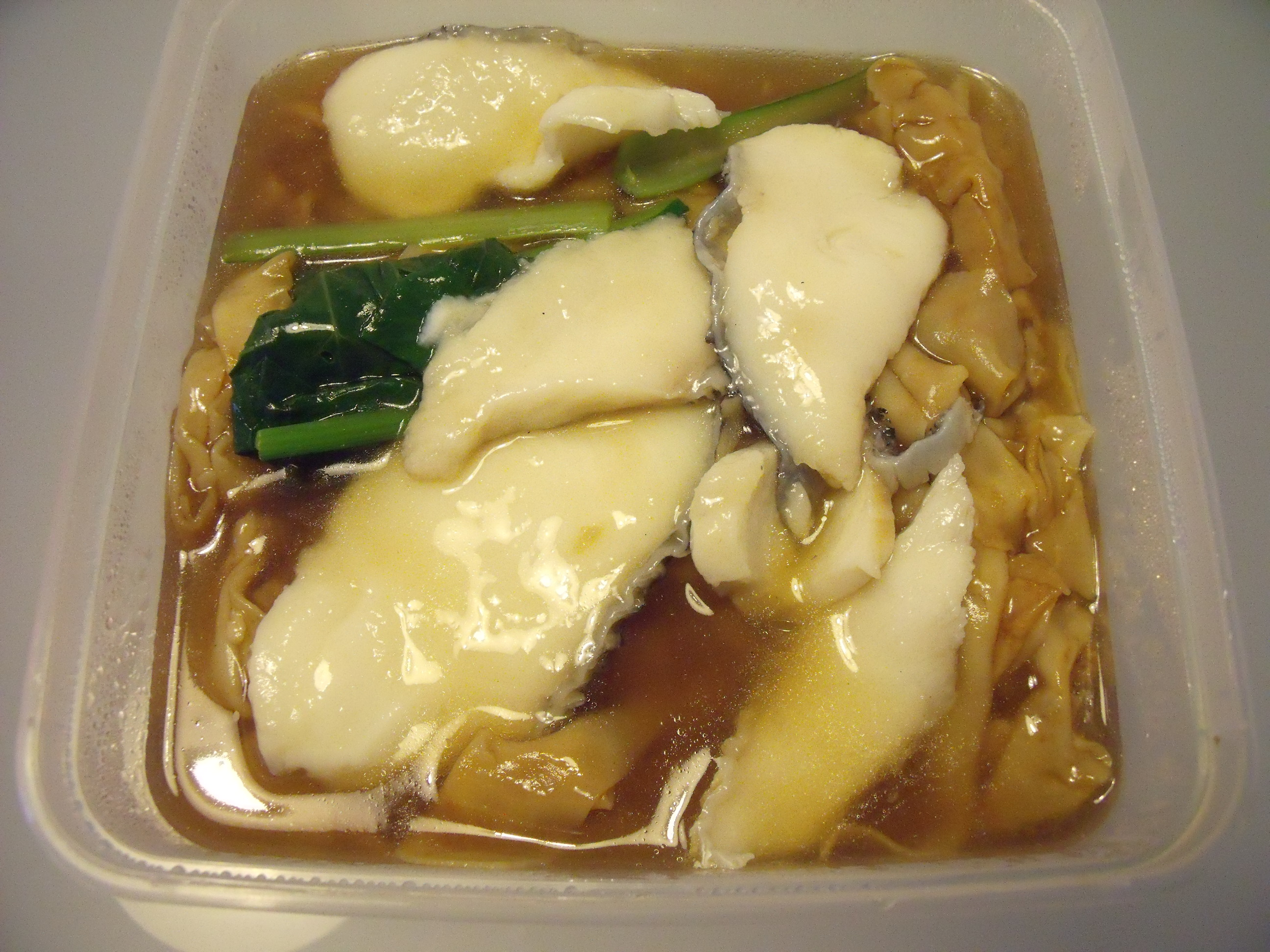
Sliced fish hor fun sold in Bukit Batok, Singapore
