= Teochew cuisine =

Chinese regional cuisine

- Chinese: 潮州菜
Transcriptions
Standard Mandarin
- Hanyu Pinyin: Cháozhōu cài
Yue: Cantonese
- Jyutping: ciu^{4} zau^{1} coi^{3}
Southern Min
- Teochew Peng'im: diê^{5} ziu^{1} cai^{3}

Chaoshan cuisine
- Chinese: 潮汕菜
Transcriptions
Standard Mandarin
- Hanyu Pinyin: Cháoshàn cài
Yue: Cantonese
- Jyutping: ciu^{4} saan^{3} coi^{3}
Southern Min
- Teochew Peng'im: diê^{5} suan^{1} cai^{3}

Teochew cuisine, also known as Chiuchow cuisine, Chaozhou cuisine or Teo-swa cuisine, originated from the Chaoshan region in the eastern part of China's Guangdong Province, which includes the cities of Chaozhou, Shantou and Jieyang. Teochew cuisine bears more similarities to that of Fujian cuisine, particularly Southern Min cuisine, due to the similarity of Teochew's and Fujian's culture, language, and their geographic proximity to each other. However, Teochew cuisine is also influenced by Cantonese cuisine in its style and technique.

== Background ==
Teochew cuisine is well known for its seafood and vegetarian dishes. Its use of flavouring is much less heavy-handed than most other Chinese cuisines and depends much on the freshness and quality of the ingredients for taste and flavour. As a delicate cuisine, oil is not often used in large quantities and there is a relatively heavy emphasis on poaching, steaming and braising, as well as the common Chinese method of stir-frying. Teochew cuisine is also known for serving congee (糜; mí; or mue), in addition to steamed rice or noodles with meals. The Teochew mue is rather different from the Cantonese counterpart, being very watery with the rice sitting loosely at the bottom of the bowl, while the Cantonese dish is more a thin gruel.

Authentic Teochew restaurants serve very strong oolong tea called Tieguanyin in very tiny cups before and after the meal. Presented as gongfu tea, the tea has a thickly bittersweet taste, colloquially known as gam gam (甘甘; gān gān).

Sauces play a vital role in Teochew cuisine. There are numerous types of Teochew sauces, with almost every dish having its own unique sauce. For example, Teochew people believe that crab is "cold" in nature, so frozen Teochew crab is usually served with crab vinegar. Crab vinegar is made by mixing brown sugar and galangal powder. Brown sugar and galangal powder are warming in nature, which can neutralize the "cold" nature of the crab. Teochew braised goose is served with goose vinegar, made from sugar, red chili peppers, and minced garlic. The vinegar has a delicious flavour that perfectly complements the natural sweetness of the goose meat. Fried dates are best fried until golden brown and crispy. This dish is best enjoyed with a touch of syrup; the syrup not only adds a hint of sweetness but also balances the spiciness of the fried food.

A condiment that is popular in Fujian and Taiwanese cuisine and commonly associated with cuisine of certain Teochew groups is shacha sauce (沙茶酱; 沙茶醬; shāchá jiàng). It is made from soybean oil, garlic, shallots, chilies, brill fish and dried shrimp. The paste has a savoury and slightly spicy taste. As an ingredient, it has multiple uses: as a base for soups, as a rub for barbecued meats, as a seasoning for stir-fried dishes, or as a component for dipping sauces.

In addition to soy sauce (widely used in all Chinese cuisines), Teochew people also use fish sauce in their cooking.

Teochew chefs often use a special stock called siang teng (上汤; 上湯; shàngtāng), literally translates from the Teochew dialect as "superior broth". This stock remains on the stove and is continuously replenished (a perpetual stew). Portrayed in popular media, some Hong Kong chefs allegedly use the same superior broth that is preserved for decades. This stock can as well be seen on Chaozhou TV's cooking programmes.

There is a notable feast in Teochew cuisine called jiat dot (食桌; shízhuō; 'food table'). A myriad of dishes are often served, which include shark fin soup, bird's nest soup, lobster, steamed fish, roasted suckling pig and braised goose. However, due to legal and environmental considerations, jiat dot no longer serves shark fin soup and bird's nest soup.

When guests go to jiat dot, they must be neatly dressed, with clean hats and footwear. In earlier times, men were expected to wear long gowns and felt hats, while women would comb their hair carefully, apply light makeup, and wear ruyi hairpins (如意發簪). If one’s clothing is untidy, speech improper, posture careless, or behavior lacking decorum, others will feel that you do not understand proper etiquette and that you fail to show respect and humility. At the table, one must observe good manners—be refined, composed, and handle tableware gently. As stated in the Liji · Quli: "Do not let liquids spill; do not make noises while eating; do not gnaw bones loudly" (毋流歠，毋咤食，毋齧骨). This means that when drinking soup, one must avoid letting it dribble from the mouth; when eating dishes, the tongue should not make smacking or clicking sounds; and when eating meat, one should not gnaw bones so forcefully that it produces noise.

Teochew chefs take pride in their skills of vegetable carving, and carved vegetables are used as garnishes on cold dishes and on the banquet table.

Teochew cuisine is also known for a late night meal known as meh siao (夜宵; yèxiāo) or daa laang (打冷; dǎléng) among the Cantonese. Teochew people enjoy eating out close to midnight in restaurants or at roadside food stalls. Some dai pai dong-like eateries stay open till dawn.

Unlike the typical menu selections of many other Chinese cuisines, Teochew restaurant menus often have a dessert section.

Many people of Teochew origin, also known as Teochiu or Teochew people, have settled in Hong Kong and places in Southeast Asia like Malaysia, Singapore, Cambodia and Thailand. Influences they bring can be noted in Singaporean cuisine and that of other settlements. A large number of Teochew people have also settled in Taiwan, evident in Taiwanese cuisine. Other notable Teochew diaspora communities are in Vietnam, Cambodia and France. A popular noodle soup in both Vietnam and Cambodia, known as hu tieu, originated from the Teochew . There is also a large diaspora of Teochew people (most were from Southeast Asia) in the United States - particularly in California. There is a Teochew Chinese Association in Paris called L'Amicale des Teochews en France.

== Notable dishes ==
English	Traditional Chinese	Simplified Chinese	Pinyin	Peng'im	Description
Bak chor mee	肉碎麵	肉碎面	ròusuì miàn	neg8 co3 mi7 / bhah4 co3 mi7	Boiled noodles, dried and mixed with variety sauce such as soy sauce, chilli sauce and lard topped with vegetables, sliced onion, minced pork, mushrooms and fish balls or fishcakes.
Bak kut teh	肉骨茶	肉骨茶	ròugǔchá	bhah4 gug4 dê5 / nêg8 gug4 dê5	A hearty soup that, at its simplest, consists of meaty pork ribs in a complex broth of herbs and spices (including star anise, cinnamon, cloves, danggui, fennel seeds and garlic), boiled together with pork bones for hours. Dark and light soy sauce may also be added to the soup during the cooking stages. Some Teochew families like to add extra Chinese herbs such as yuzhu (rhizome of Solomon's seal) and juzhi (wolfberry fruit) for a sweeter, slightly stronger flavoured soup. The dish is usually eaten with rice or noodles (sometimes as a noodle soup), and often served with fried dough fritters. Garnish includes chopped coriander or green onions and a sprinkling of fried shallots. A variation of bak kut teh uses chicken instead of pork, which then becomes chik kut teh. Bak kut teh is particularly popular in Southeast Asian countries such as Singapore and Malaysia.
Braised varieties	滷味	卤味	lǔwèi	lou6 bhi7	Teochew cuisine is noted for its variety of braised dishes, which includes geese, duck, pork, bean curd and offal.
Chai tau kueh	菜頭粿	菜头粿	càitóu guǒ	cai5 tau7 guê2	A savoury fried cake, made of white radish and rice flour. It is commonly stir-fried with soy sauce, eggs, garlic, spring onion and occasionally dried shrimp.
Chwee kueh	水粿	水粿	shuǐguǒ	zui6 guê2	Cup-shaped steamed rice cakes topped with chopped preserved/salted radish.
Crystal balls	水晶包	水晶包	shuǐjīng bāo	zui6 zian1 bao1	A steamed dessert with a variety of fillings such as yellow milk (奶黄; 奶黃; nǎihuáng; ni ng, ni7 ng5), yam paste (芋泥; yùní; or ni, ou7 ni5) or bean paste made from mung beans or azuki beans (red beans). They are similar to mochi.
Deep-Fried tofu	炸豆腐	炸豆腐	zhà dòufu	za5 dao7 hu7	A simple deep fried tofu dish, and was later adopted by Guangzhou's residents. First, deep-fry slices of fresh firm tofu until they are golden, and then serve with salted water dip (ingredients are boiling water, salt, and chopped Chinese chives). In modern times, some Teochew people now use the air fryer to prepare them for convenience and reduction of the amount of fat and calories in the food.
Fish balls / fishcakes / fish dumplings	魚丸 / 魚粿 / 魚餃	鱼丸 / 鱼粿 / 鱼饺	yúwán / yúguǒ / yújiǎo	he7 in5 (her ee) / he7 guê2 (her kueh) / he7 gieu2 (her kiaw)	This fish paste made into balls, cakes and dumplings can be cooked in many ways but are often served in Teochew-style noodle and soups.
Fish ball noodle soup	魚丸麵	鱼丸面	yúwán miàn	he7 in7 min7 (her ee mee)	Any of several kinds of egg and rice noodles may be served either in a light fish-flavoured broth or dry, along with fishballs, fishcakes, beansprouts and lettuce.
Flavored-potted goose	滷水鵝	卤水鹅	lǔ shuǐ é	lou7 zui6 gho5	A well-known braised goose dish, often accompanised by tofu.
Fried beef balls	炸牛肉丸	炸牛肉丸	zhà niúròu wán	za5 ghu7 bhah5 in5 (za ghu bak ee)	A simple deep-fired beef ball dish serves with dipping sauce such as shacha sauce or salted water dip (ingredients are boiling water, salt, and chopped Chinese chives). In modern times, some Teochew people now use the air fryer to prepare them for convenience and reduction of the amount of fat and calories in the food.
Fun guo	粉粿	粉粿	fěnguǒ	hung6 guê2	A type of steamed dumplings. This is usually filled with dried radish, garlic chives, ground pork, dried shrimp, shiitake mushrooms and peanuts. The dumpling wrapper is made from a mixture of flour or plant starches mixed together with water. In Cantonese, these are called chiu chow fun guo (潮州粉果; Cháozhōu fěnguǒ), in which the Chinese character 粿 is replaced by 果.
Head of mustard greens with mushrooms	厚菇大芥菜	厚菇大芥菜	hòugū dà jiècài	gao6 gou1 dua7 gai5 cai3	A dish of Brassica juncea (Chinese mustard) and shiitake (Chinese black mushrooms) in a soup. Originally a vegetarian soup, it often added with diced pork belly and other ingredients.
Kway chap	粿汁	粿汁	guǒzhī	guê6 zab4 (kueh chap)	A dish of flat, broad rice sheets in a soup made from dark soy sauce served with pig offal, braised duck meat, various kinds of bean curd, preserved salted vegetables and braised hard-boiled eggs.
Marinating pork head / Braised pig head	滷豬頭肉	卤猪头肉	lǔ zhū tóu ròu	lou7 de1 tao7 nêg8	Clean and braise pork head in soy sauce and rock sugar. Cilantro, garlic, ginger, chilies, star anise and other spices may also added.
Mee pok	麵薄	面薄	miànbáo	min7 boh8 (mee pok)	A popular noodle dish served with minced pork, braised mushrooms, fishballs, dumplings, sauce and other garnish.
Oolong tea	烏龍茶	乌龙茶	wūlóng chá	ou1 lêng7 dê5 (Ou-leeng teh)	Tieguanyin is one of the most popular Teochew teas. However, the Teochew people prefer their own brand of Oolong tea, which is the hong wang dan cong teh (凤凰单丛茶; 鳳凰單丛茶; fènghuáng dāncóng chá).
Oyster omelette	蠔烙	蠔烙	háolào	o7 luah4 (or lua)	A dish of omelette cooked with fresh raw oysters, tapioca starch and eggs. Teochew-style oyster omelette is usually deep fried and very crisp. Dip condiments are fish sauce and pepper or chili sauce.
Pan-fried marinated fish	烳醃魚	烳腌鱼	pǔyānyú	bu5 iem5 he5	A pan-fried dish of marinated fish, typically using Larimichthys crocea as the main ingredient but can use other alternatives such as a white croaker, Japanese sea bass or other types of bass, or tilefish.
Patriotic soup (Protect the Country Dish)	護國菜	护国菜	hùguó cài	hu6 gog8 cai3	Developed during the Mongol conquest of the Song dynasty and named by Song's last emperor Zhao Bing. A simple soup boiled with stir-fried leaf vegetable (commonly sweet potato leaves since the Ming dynasty but also can use amaranth, spinach, Ipomoea aquatica or other leafy greens as alternatives) and edible mushrooms (preferably straw mushrooms) and broth (vegetable, chicken, or beef).
Pig's organ soup (Pork offal soup)	豬雜湯	猪杂汤	zhūzátāng	de1 zab8 teng1 (ter zap terng)	
Popiah	薄餅仔	薄饼仔	báobǐngzǎi	boh4 bian2 (薄饼) (po piah)	A fresh (non-fried) spring roll usually eaten during the Qingming Festival. The skin is a soft, thin paper-like crepe made from wheat flour. The filling is mainly finely grated and steamed or stir-fried turnip, yam bean (jicama), which has been cooked with a combination of other ingredients such as bean sprouts, French beans, and lettuce leaves, depending on the individual vendor, along with grated carrots, slices of Chinese sausage, thinly sliced fried tofu, chopped peanuts or peanut powder, fried shallots and shredded omelette. Other common variations of popiah include pork (lightly seasoned and stir-fried), shrimp or crab meat. It is eaten in accompaniment with a sweet sauce (often a bean sauce, a blended soy sauce or hoisin sauce or a shrimp paste sauce).
Pork jelly	豬腳凍	猪脚冻	zhūjiǎo dòng	de1 ka1 dang3 (ter ka dang)	Braised pig's leg made into jelly form, sliced and served cold.
Prawns sautéed with olive vegetables	欖菜焗蝦	榄菜焗虾	lǎncàijúxiā	na6 cai3 gog8 hê5	A dish of deep-fried prawns
Raw Pickled Seafood	生醃海鮮	生腌海鲜	shēng yān hǎixiān	cên1 iam1 hai2 cin1	There are various kinds of Chaoshan fresh seafoods pickles, such as raw pickled crab, raw pickled blood clams, raw pickled shrimp, raw pickled prawns, raw pickled mantis shrimp. Seafoods are steeped in a pickling bath made of vinegar, salt, soy sauce, wine, cilantro, garlic, ginger, chilies and other spices.
Red peach cake	紅桃粿	红桃粿	hóng táo guǒ	ang7 to7 guê2 (ang tao kueh, ung toh kway)	Pink hue rice flour skin wrapped with flavorful glutinous rice. Pressed on a nicely designed peach shaped wooden mould, and then steam the dumpling to perfection. You can eat it freshly steamed, or pan-fried.
Salted vegetable duck soup	鹹菜鴨湯	咸菜鸭汤	xiáncài yātāng	giêm7 cai5 ah8 teng1 (kiam cai ak terng)	A soup boiled with duck, preserved salted vegetable, tomatoes and preserved sour plum.
Scalding (hot water dipping) blood clams	白灼血蚶	白灼血蚶	bái zhuó xiè hān	beh8 ziag4 hueh4 ham1	Wash the blood clams and then soak them in cold salted water to let them release sands inside their body. Boil a pot of water, add some coriander, carefully pour the blood clams into the boiling water, dip them in hot water for 10 seconds and they are ready to eat.
Sichuan pepper chicken	川椒雞	川椒鸡	chuān jiāo jī	cuêng1 ziê1 goi1	A traditionally deep-fried chicken dish, usually accompanied with leafy green from Lysimachia clethroides, known as pearl vegetable (珍珠菜). However, Lysimachia clethroides's leaves are unavailable to use in culinary outside of China, but basil, spinach, or other leafy green vegetables can be substitutes to them in preparation of the dish.
Sliced Cuttlefish on Ice with Wasabi Sauce	冰鎮芥辣墨魚(墨斗)片	冰镇芥辣墨鱼(墨斗)片	bīngzhèn jièlà mòyúpiàn	bian1 ding3 gao3 luah4 bhag8 dao2 pieng3	Clean the cuttlefish, remove the skin, internal organs and head and boil it in 80 °C salty water for 10 minutes. Soak it in ice water for 5 minutes after cook. Pat dry with kitchen towel and slice it. Place the slices on top of a dish with a thick layer of ice. When eating, pick up the cuttlefish slices with chopsticks and dip them in mustard and soy sauce.
Spring rolls with prawn or minced meat fillings	蝦卷 / 燒卷 / 五香	虾卷 / 烧卷 / 五香	xiājuǎn / shāojuǎn / wǔxiāng	hê7 geng2 (heh gerng) / siê1 geng2, sio1 geng2 (sio gerng) / ngou6 hiang1 (ngo hiang)	Mixed pork and prawn paste (sometimes fish), seasoned with five-spice powder, wrapped and rolled in a bean curd skin and deep-fried or pan-fried. It is sometimes referred to as Teochew-style spring roll in restaurant menus.
Steamed chives dumplings	韭菜粿	韭菜粿	jiǔ cài guǒ	gu6 cai2 guê2	They are sometimes sautéed to give them a crispy texture.
Steamed goose	炊鵝	炊鹅	chuī é	cuê1 gho5	
Taro paste	芋泥	芋泥	yùní	ou7 ni5 (orh ni / orh nee)	A traditional Teochew dessert made primarily from taro. The taro is steamed and then mashed into a thick paste, which forms the base of the dessert. Pumpkin is also added for sweetness and to create a smoother consistency. Lard or fried onion oil is then added for fragrance. The dessert is traditionally sweetened with water chestnut syrup, and served with ginkgo nuts. Modern versions of the dessert include the addition of coconut cream and sweet corn. The dessert is commonly served at traditional Teochew wedding banquet dinners as the last course, marking the end of the banquet.
Teochew chicken	潮州雞	潮州鸡	Cháozhōu jī	dio7/diê7 ziu1 goi1 (Teochew koi)	A dish of sliced chicken
Teochew cold crab	潮州凝蟹 (潮州凍蟹)	潮州凝蟹 (潮州冻蟹)	Cháozhōu níng gxiè (Cháozhōu dòng xiè)	dio7/diê7 ziu1 ngang7 hoi6 (dio7/diê7 ziu1 dong3 hoi6) (Teochew ngang hoi)	The whole crab is first steamed then served chilled. The species of crab most commonly used is Charybdis cruciata.
Teochew cold fish	潮州魚飯	潮州鱼饭	Cháozhōu yúfàn	dio7/diê7 ziu1 he7 bung7 (Teochew he bung)	Steam fish with ginger slices, let it cool down to room temperature, then remove the ginger slices and keep it in refrigerator for at least 2 hours.
Teochew hot pot / Teochew steamboat	潮州暖爐, 潮州火鍋	潮州暖炉, 潮州火锅	Cháozhōu nuǎnlú, huǒguō	dio7 ziu1 ruang2 lou5/diê7 ziu1 ruêng2 lou5, dio7/diê7 ziu1 huê6 uê1 (Teochew zuang lou)	A dish where fresh, thinly sliced ingredients are placed into a simmering flavourful broth to cook and then dipped into various mixed sauces, usually with Shacha and soy sauce as its main components. Ingredients often include leafy vegetables, yam, tofu, pomfret and other seafood, beef balls, fish balls, pork balls, mushrooms and Chinese noodles, among others. Teochew hot pot, like other Chinese hot pots, is served in a large communal metal pot at the center of the dining table.
Teochew Oyster Congee	蠔糜 / 蠔仔 / 潮州蠔仔肉碎粥	蚝糜 / 蚝粥 / 潮州蚝仔肉碎粥	háozhōu	o7 muê5	Teochew congee with oysters and minced pork
Teochew rice noodle soup	潮州粿條	潮州粿条	Cháozhōu guǒtiáo	dio7 ziu1 guê6 diao5 /diê7 ziu1 guê6 diou5 (Teochew kuay teow)	A quintessential Teochew-style noodle soup that is also particularly popular in Vietnam and Cambodia (known respectively as hủ tiếu /hủ tíu and គុយទាវ kuyteav), through the influx of Teochew immigrants. It is a dish of yellow egg noodles and thin rice noodles served in a delicate, fragrant soup with meatballs, other various meats, seafood (such as shrimp), fried fishcake slices, quail eggs, blanched Chinese cabbage and sometimes offal. The soup base is typically made of pork or chicken bones and dried squid. Just before serving, the noodle soup is garnished with fried minced garlic, fried shallots, thinly sliced scallions and fresh cilantro (coriander) sprigs. For those who enjoy their noodle soup with added depth, the solid ingredients may be dipped into Shacha sauce or Teochew chilli oil.
Teochew-style congee	潮州糜	潮州糜	Cháozhōu zhōu	diê7/dio7 ziu1 mue5 (Teochew mue)	A rice soup that has a more watery texture as compared to the Cantonese congee. It is commonly served with various salty accompaniments such as salted vegetables (kiam chai), preserved radish (chai por), black Chinese olives (烏橄欖), olive grits (橄欖糝), boiled salted duck eggs, fried salted fish and fried peanuts.
Teochew-style steamed pomfret	潮州蒸鯧魚	潮州蒸鲳鱼	Cháozhōu zhēng chāngyú	diê7 ziu1 zêng1 ciên he5/dio7 ziu1 zêng1 cion1 he5 (Teochew chue chioh her)	Silvery pomfret steamed with preserved salted vegetables, lard and sour plums.
Yusheng	魚生	鱼生	yúshēng	he5 sên1 (her sae)	A raw fish salad (similar to ceviche or sashimi) whose typical ingredients include fresh salmon, white radish, carrot, red pepper (capsicum), ginger, kaffir lime leaves, Chinese parsley, chopped peanuts, toasted sesame seeds, Chinese shrimp crackers or fried dried shrimp, and five-spice powder, with the dressing primarily made from plum sauce. It is customarily served as an appetiser to bring good luck for the new year and is usually eaten on the seventh day of the Lunar New Year.

== Gallery ==
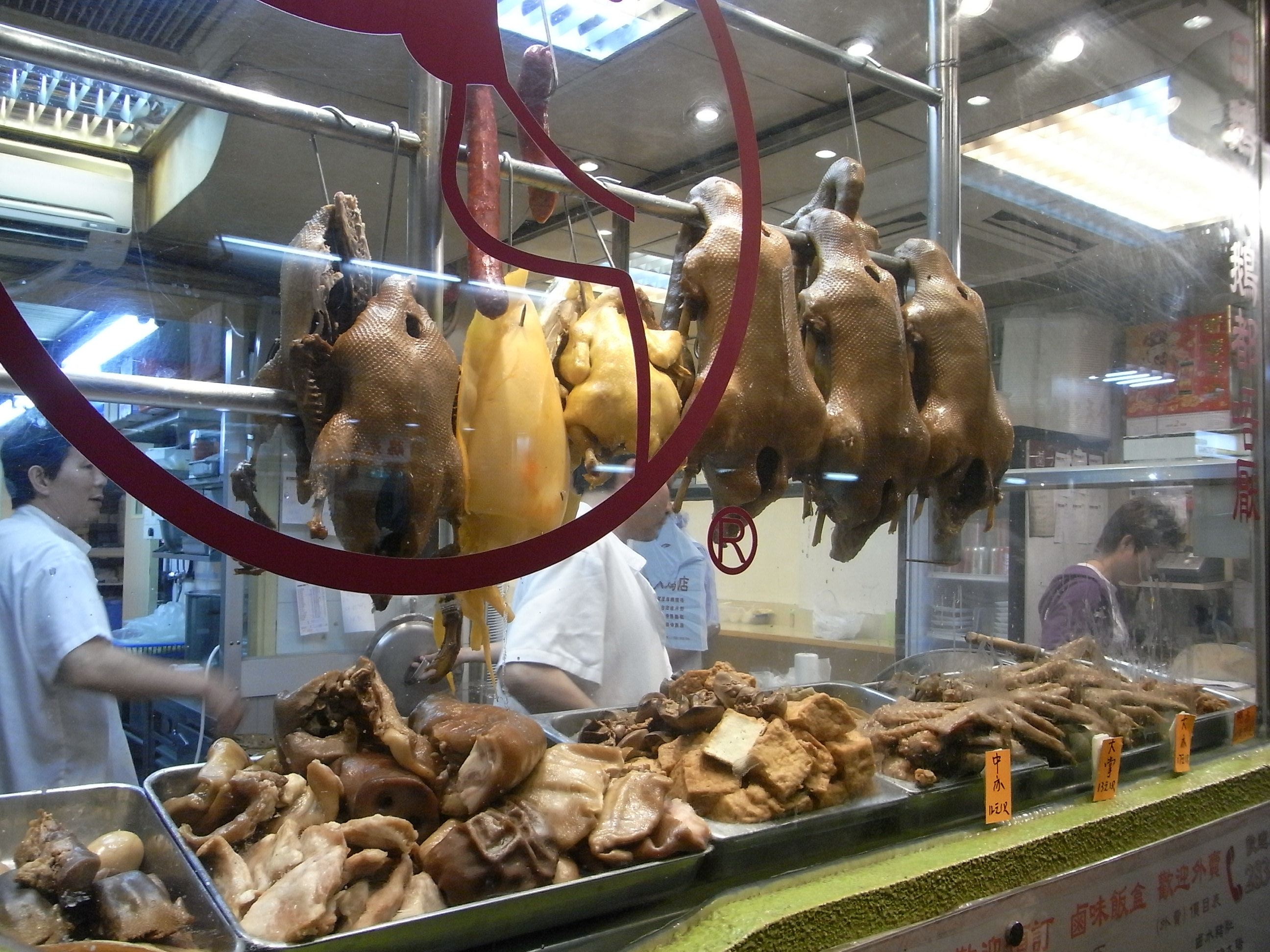
"Flavor potted" goose (滷水鵝)

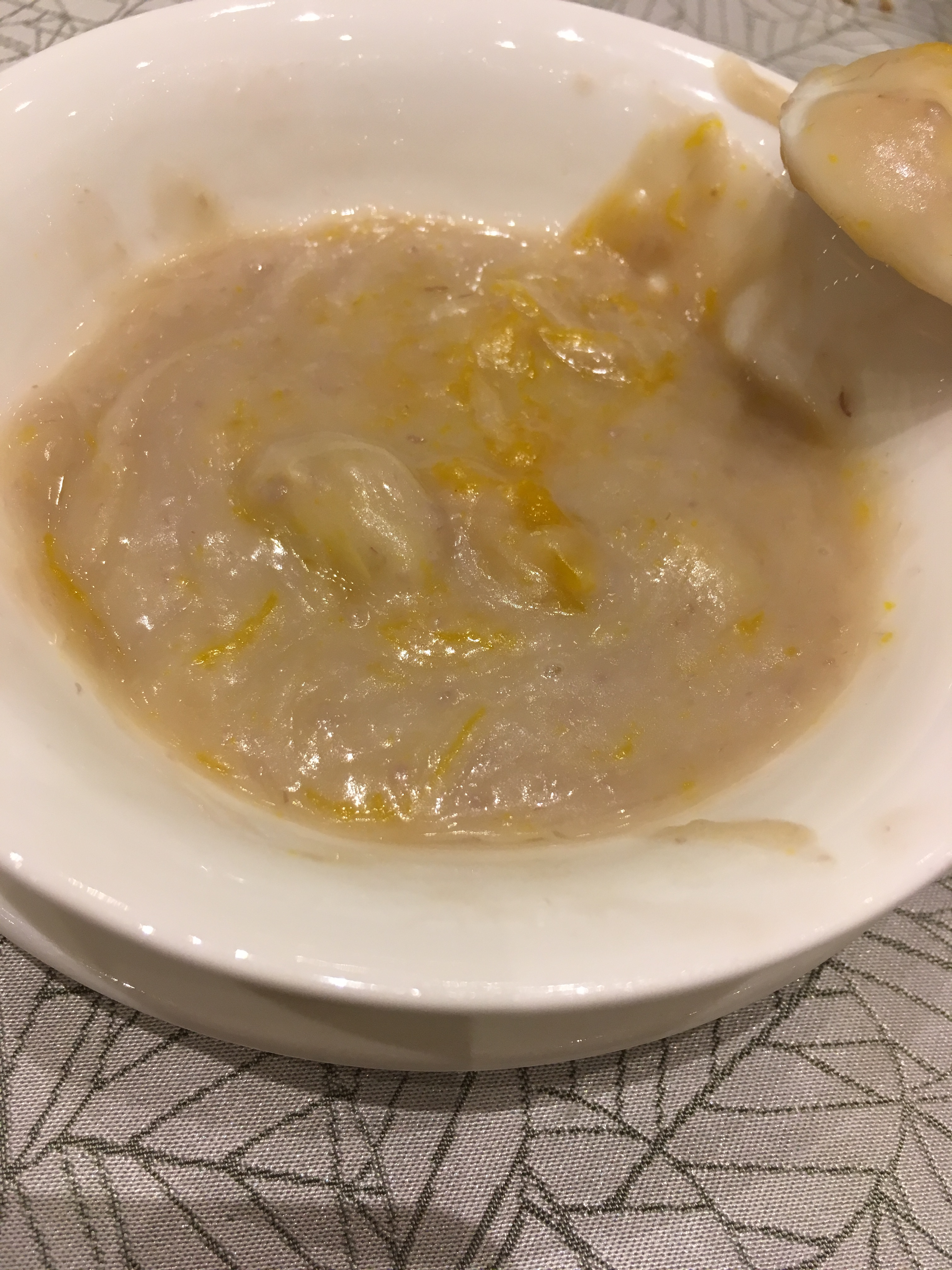
Taro paste (芋泥)

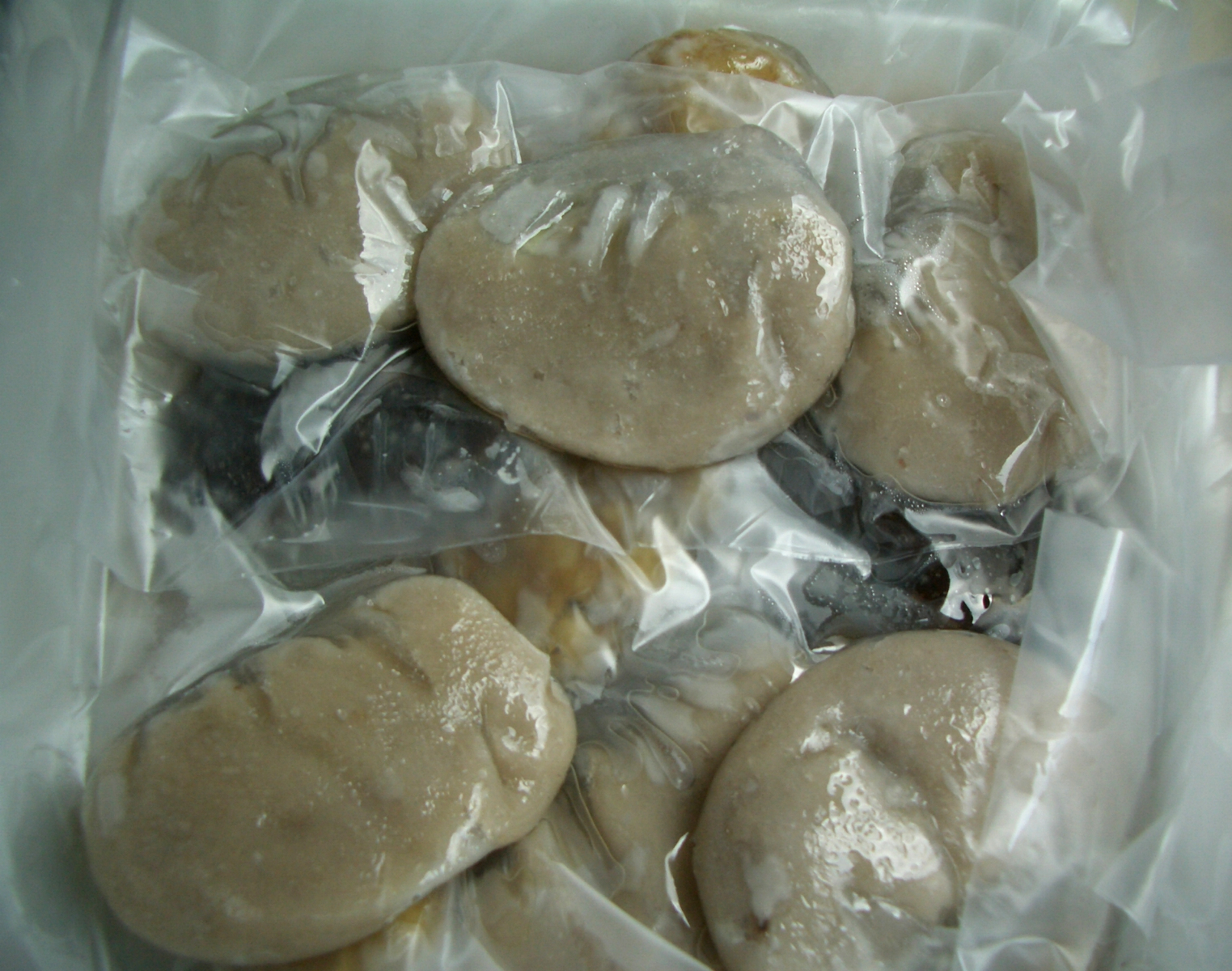
Crystal balls (水晶包)

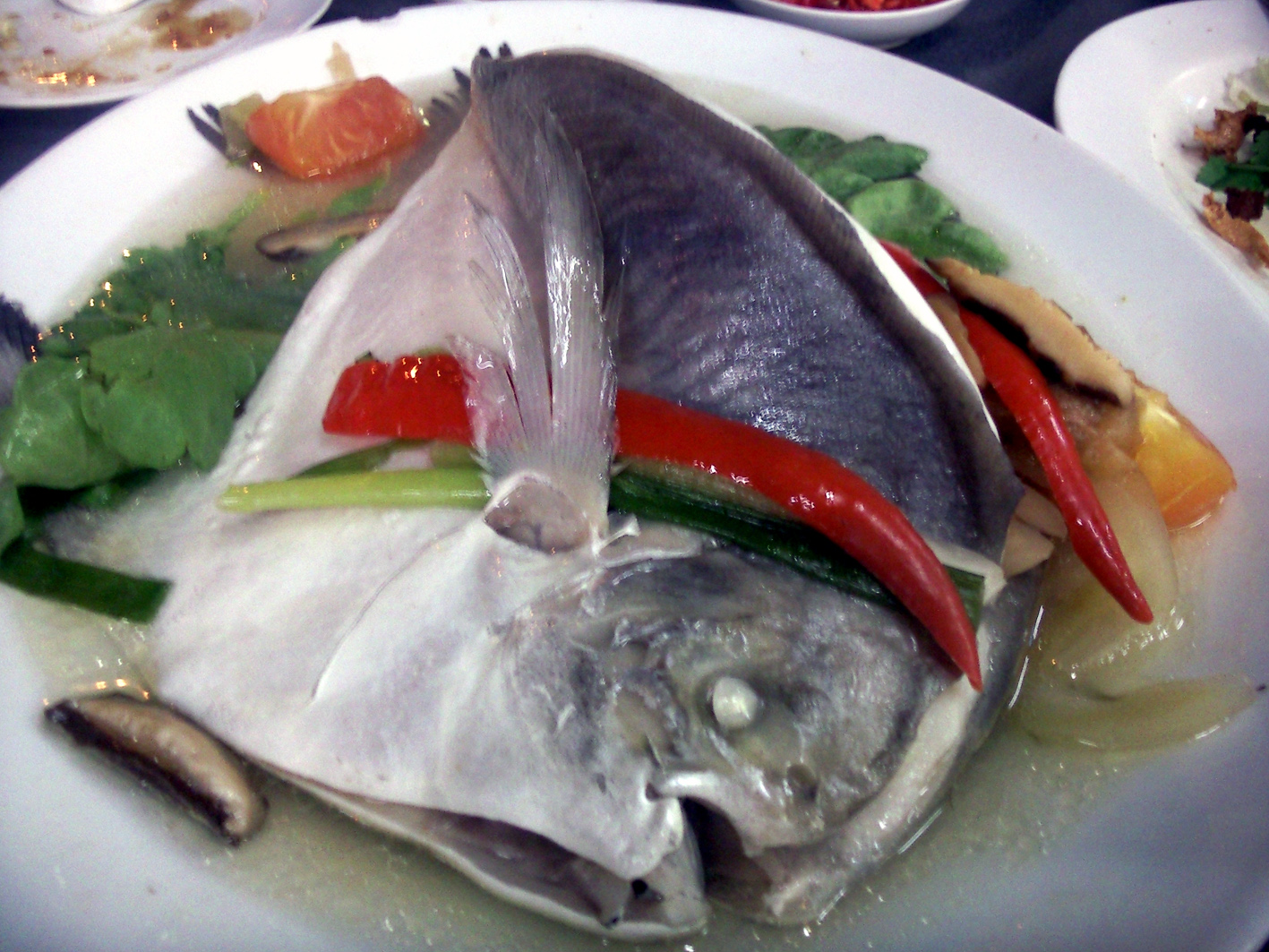
Steamed fish (炊魚)

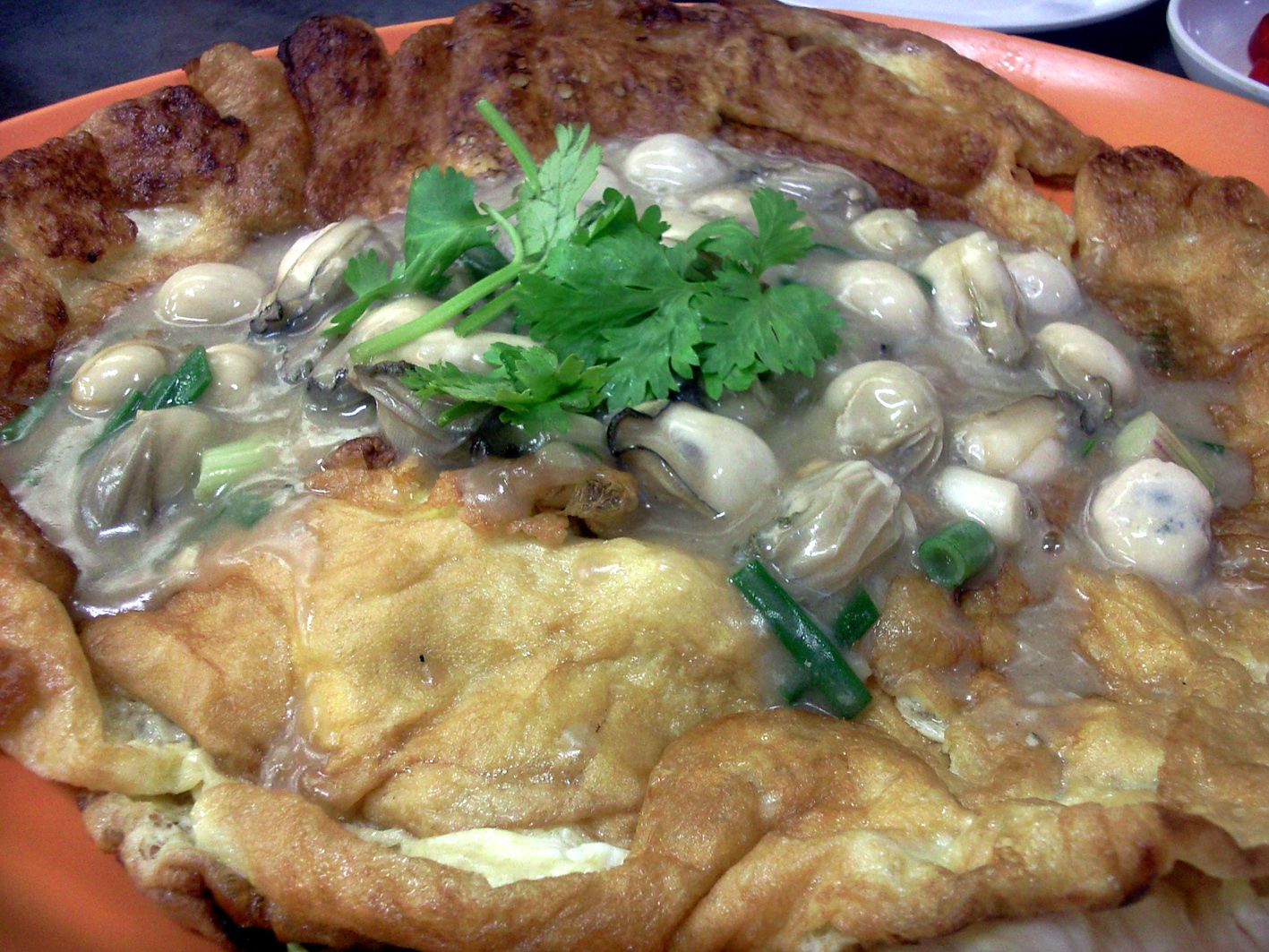
Oyster omelette (蚝烙)

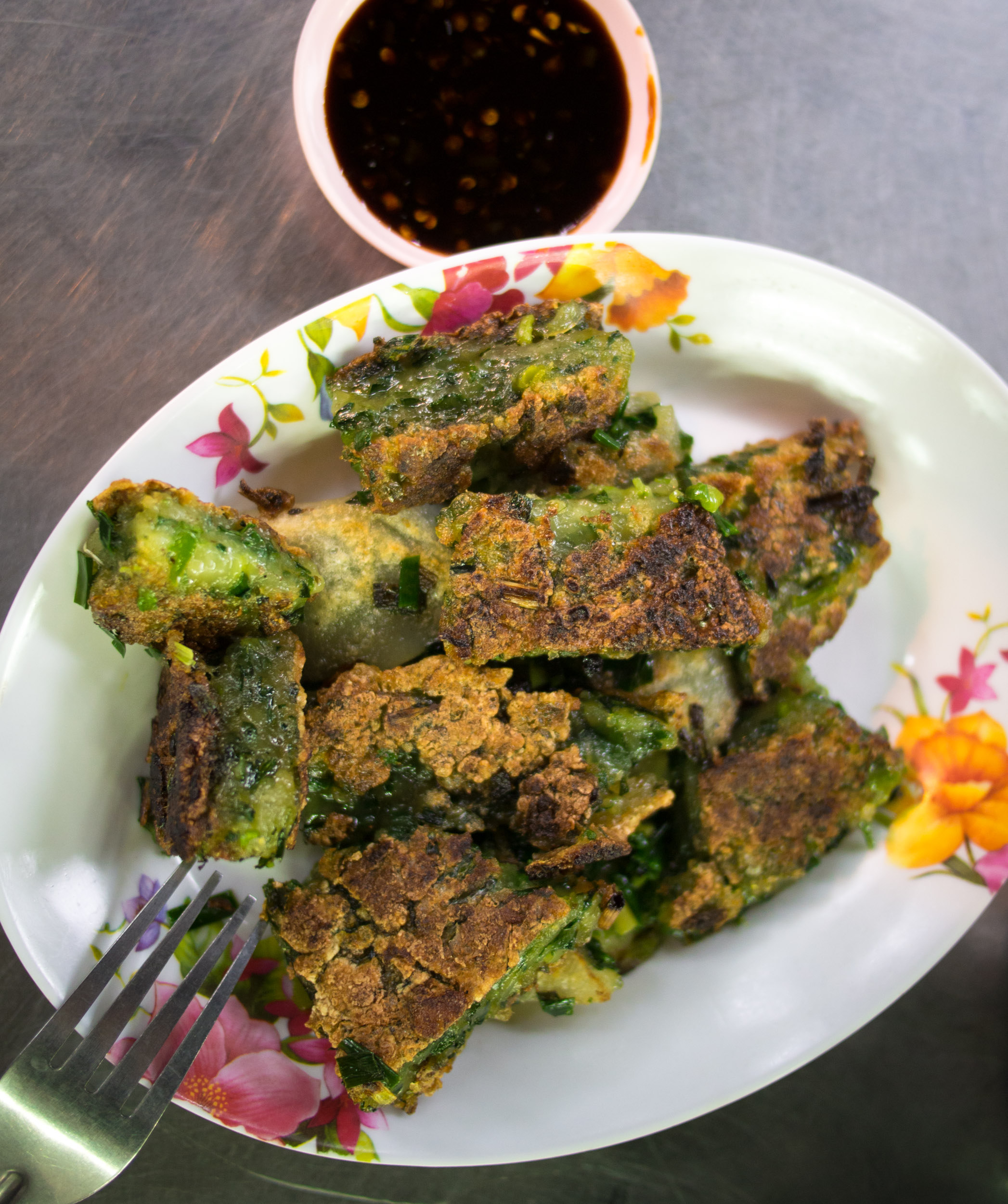
Fried chive dumplings (韭菜粿)

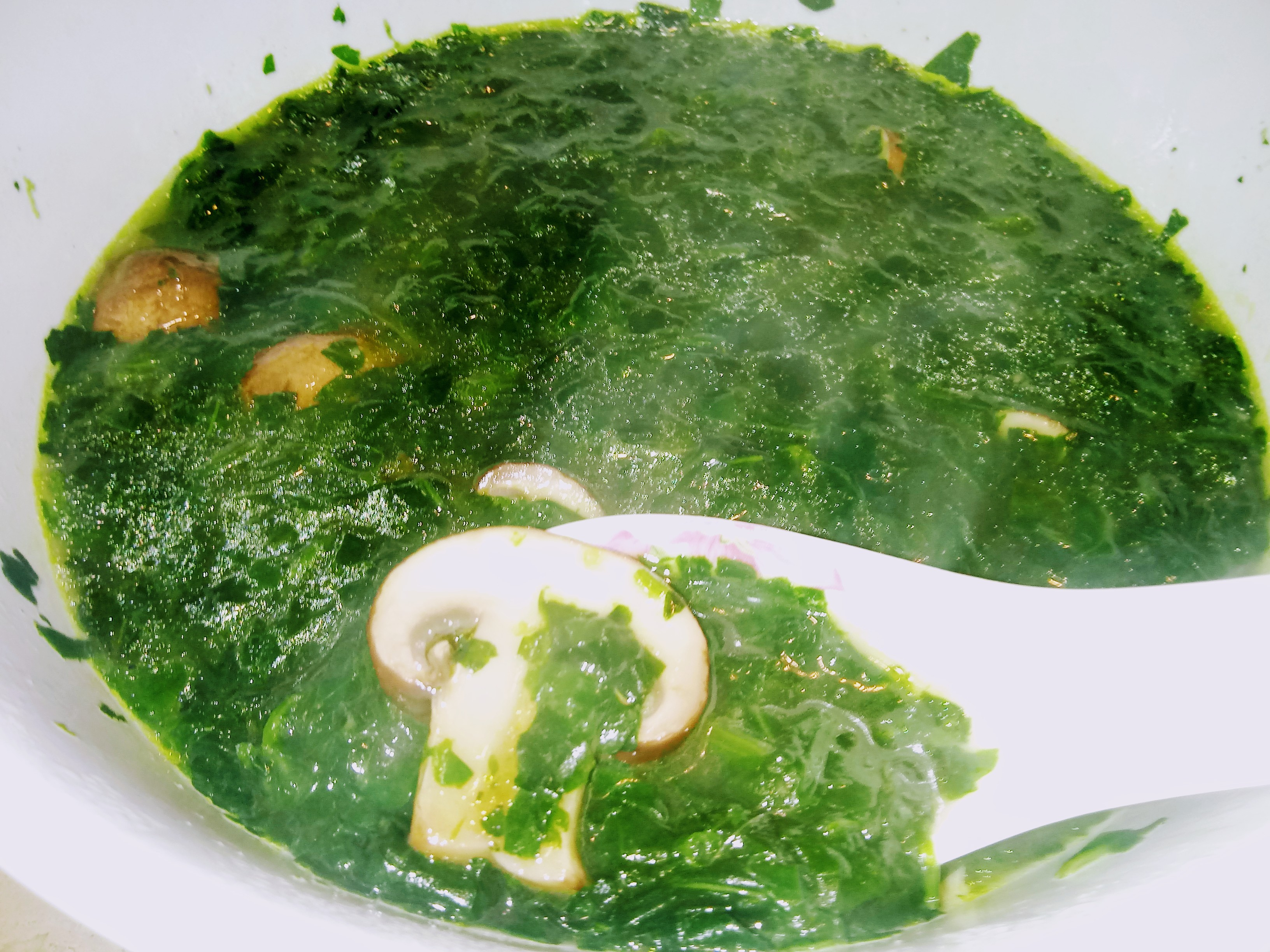
Patriotic Soup (Protect the Country Dish (護國菜))

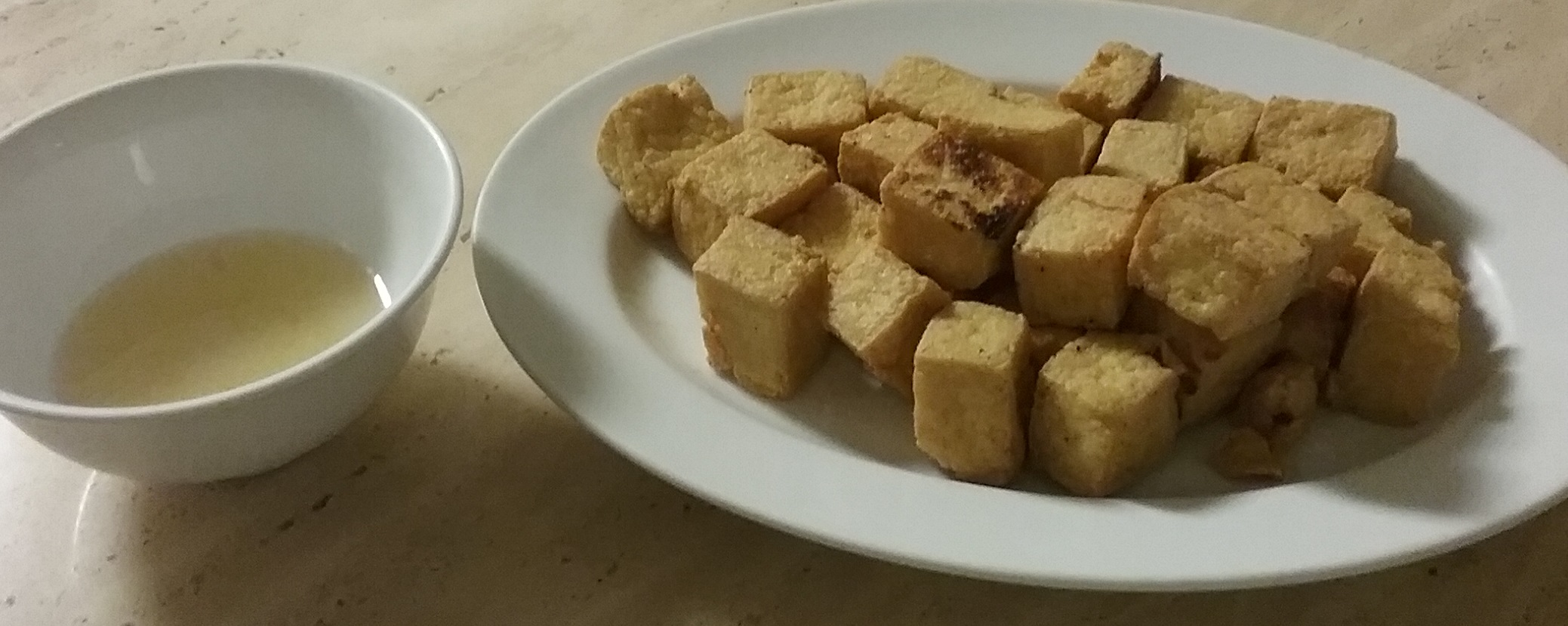
A dish of fried tofu (炸豆腐) with dipping sauce.

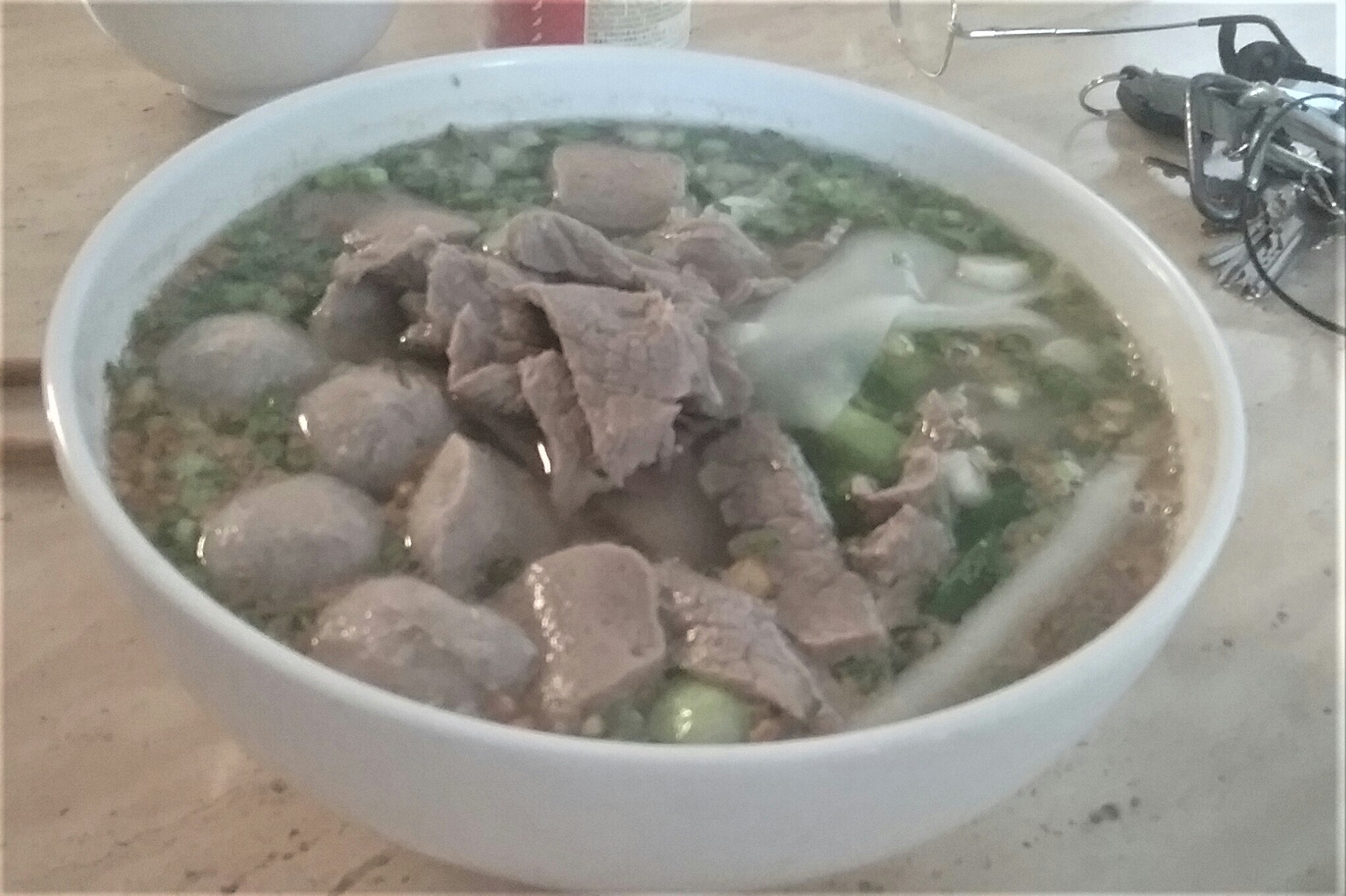
Teochew rice noodle soup (潮州粿條).

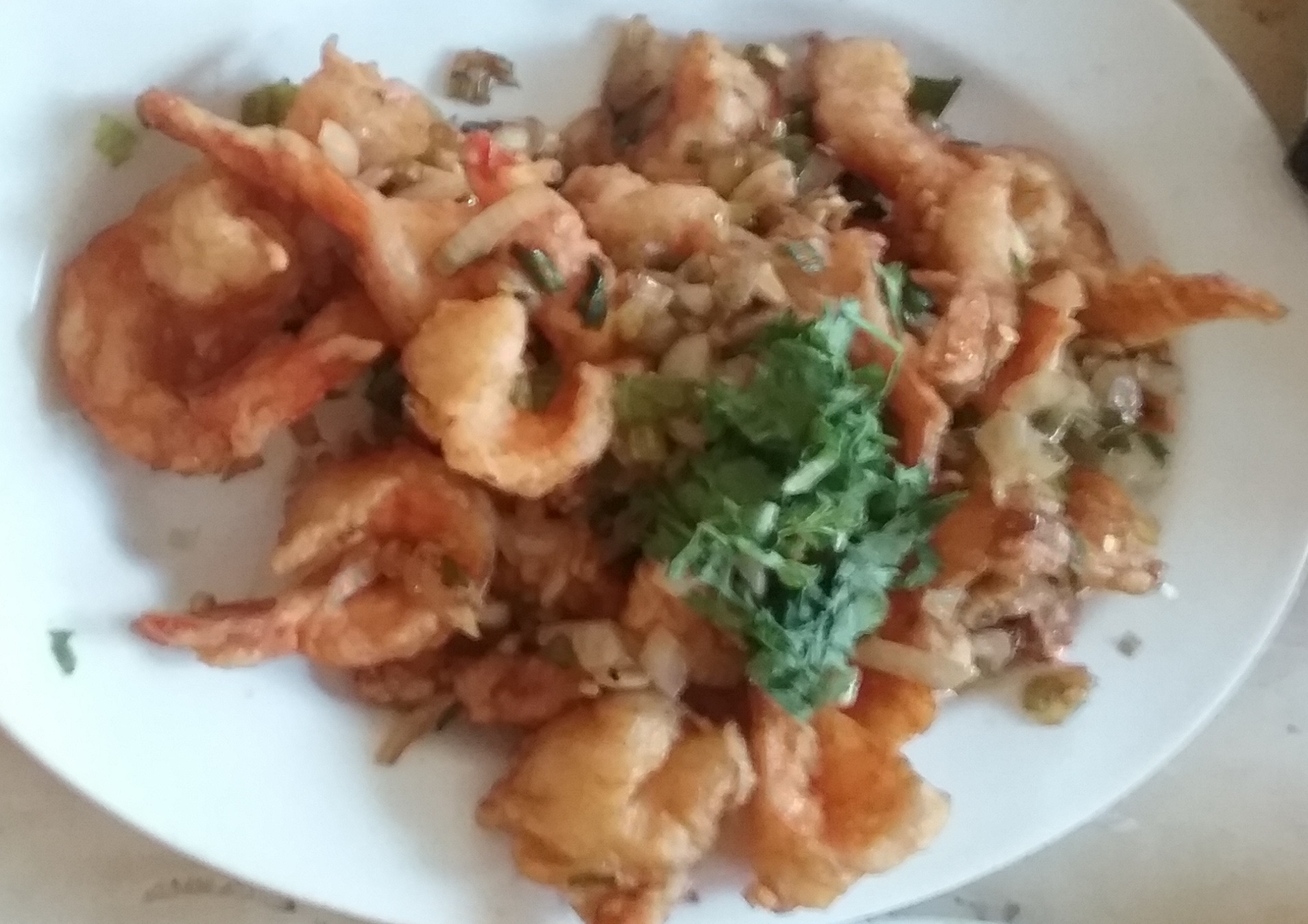
Sautéed prawns with olive vegetables (欖菜焗蝦) .

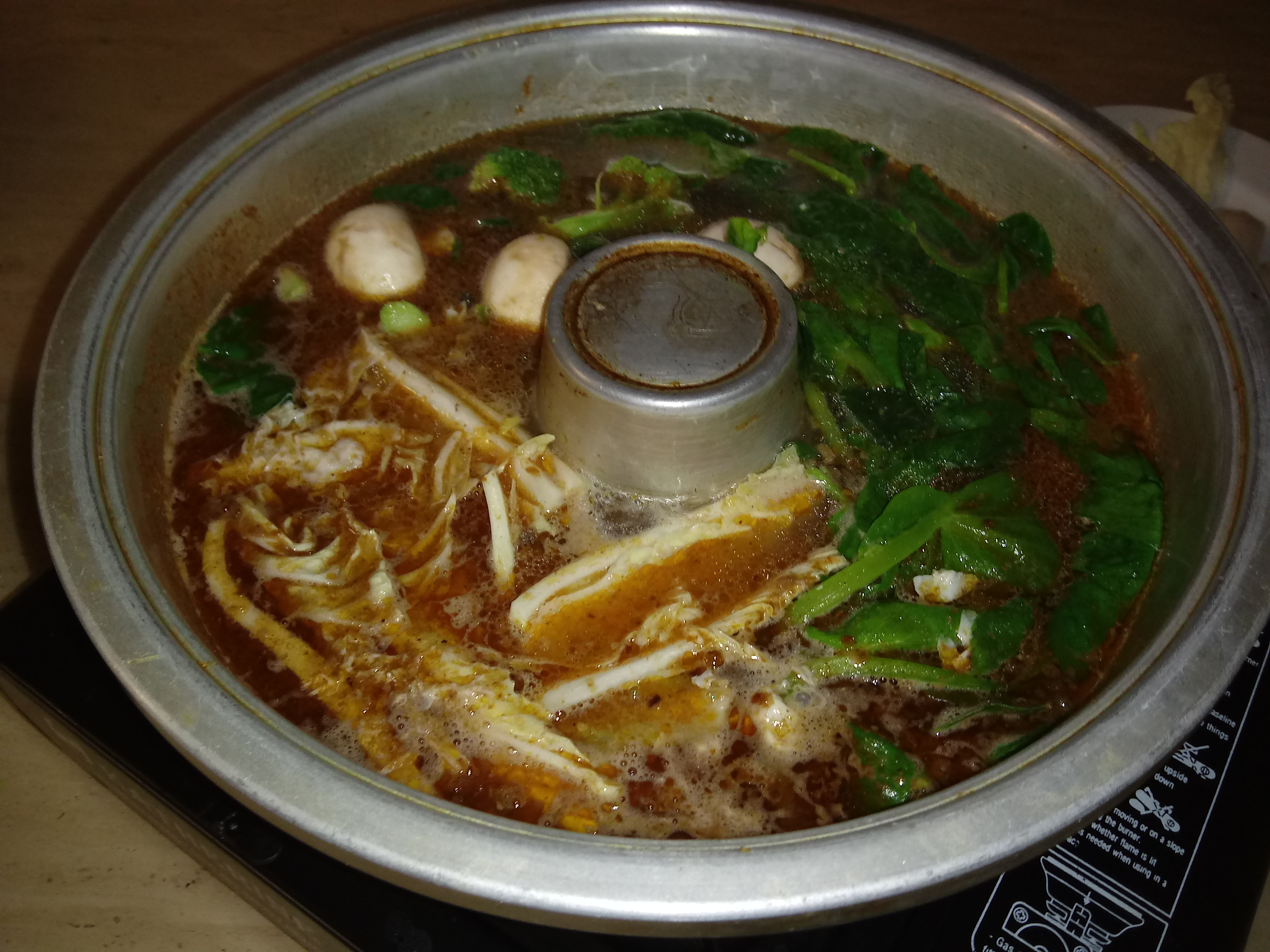
Teochew hotpot (潮州火鍋)

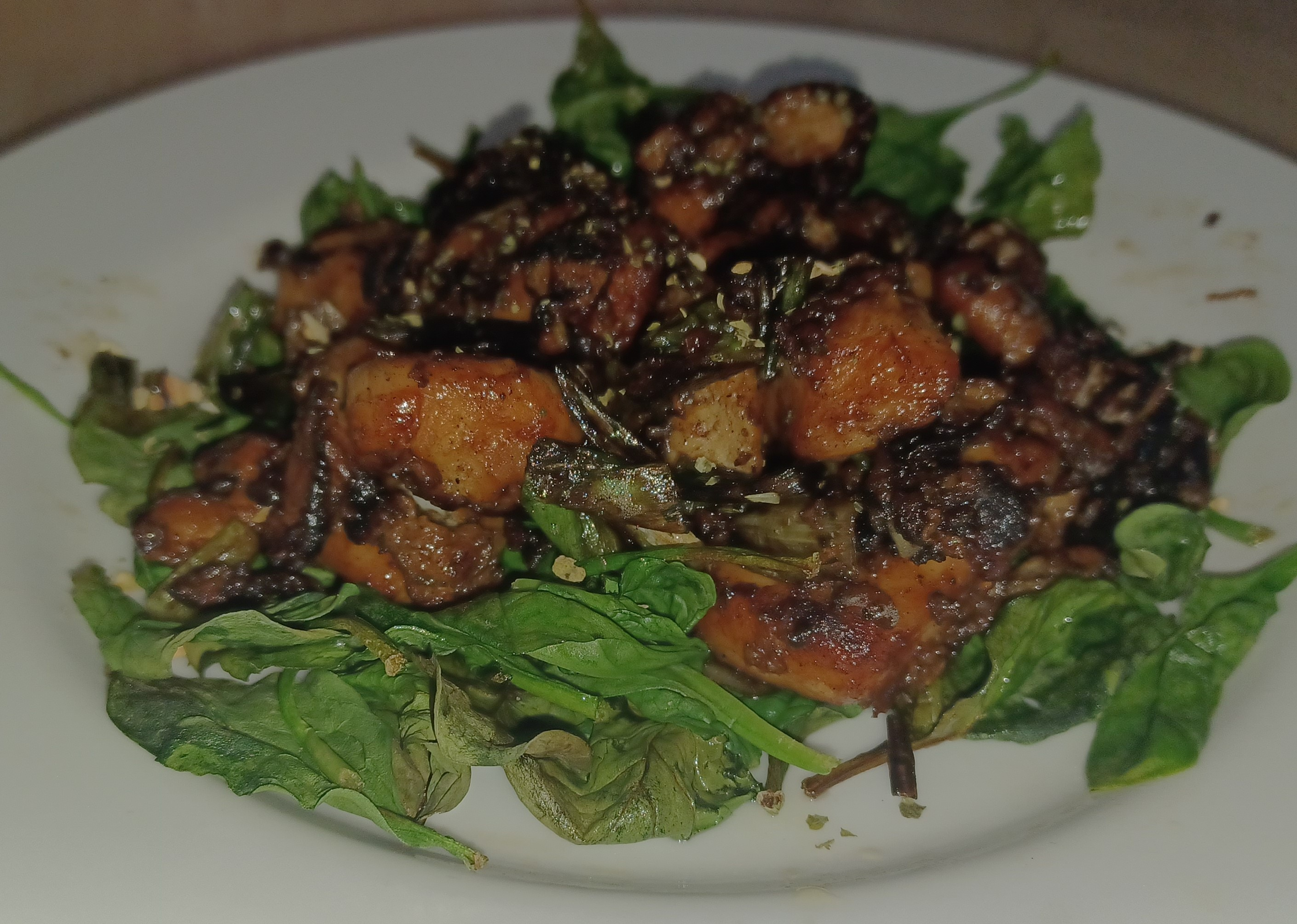
Sichuan pepper chicken (川椒雞)

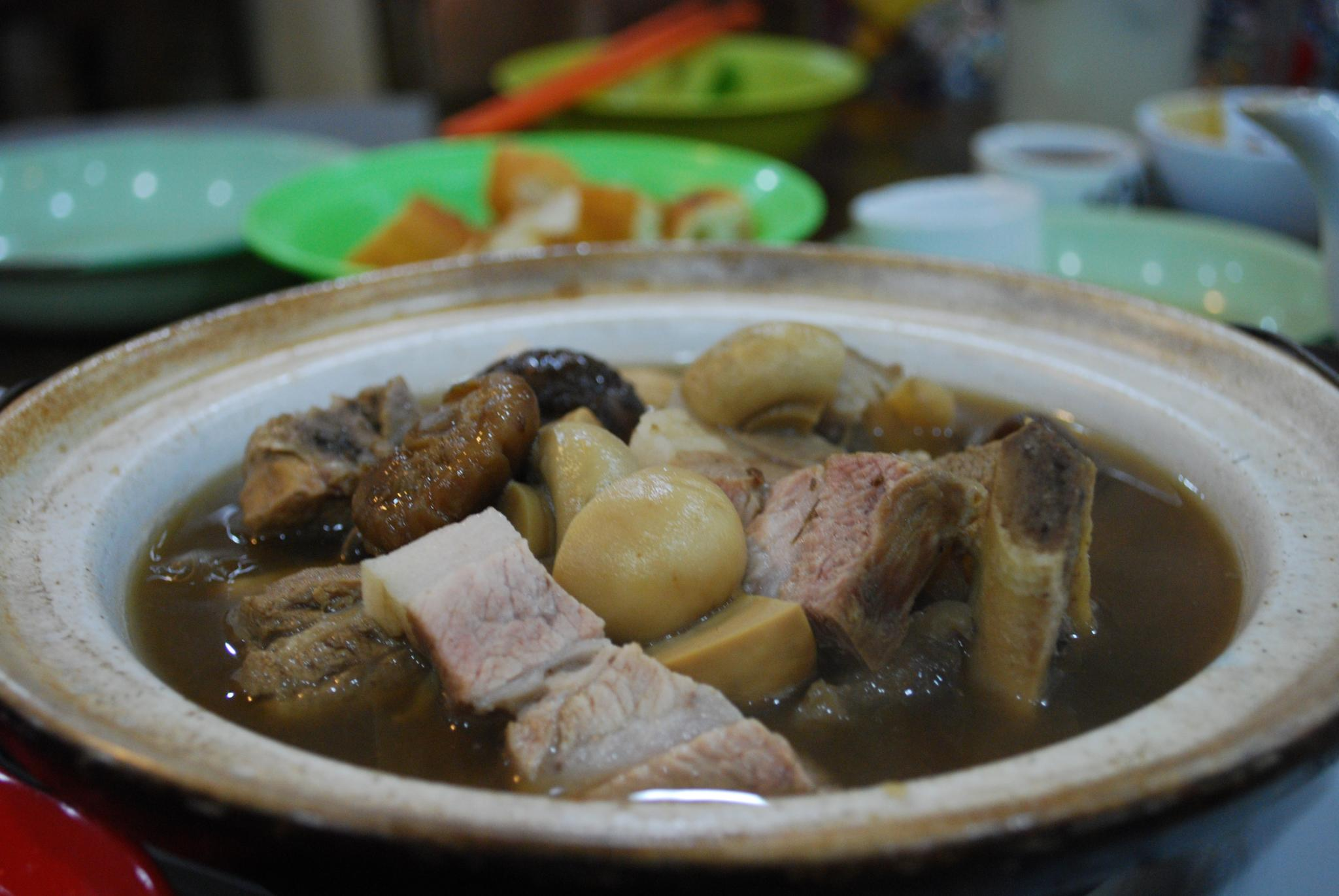
Bak Kut Teh (肉骨茶)

== See also ==
- List of Chinese dishes
- Teochew porridge
- Teochew people
- Chaoshan culture
