= Sichuan pepper chicken =

Teochew fried chicken dish

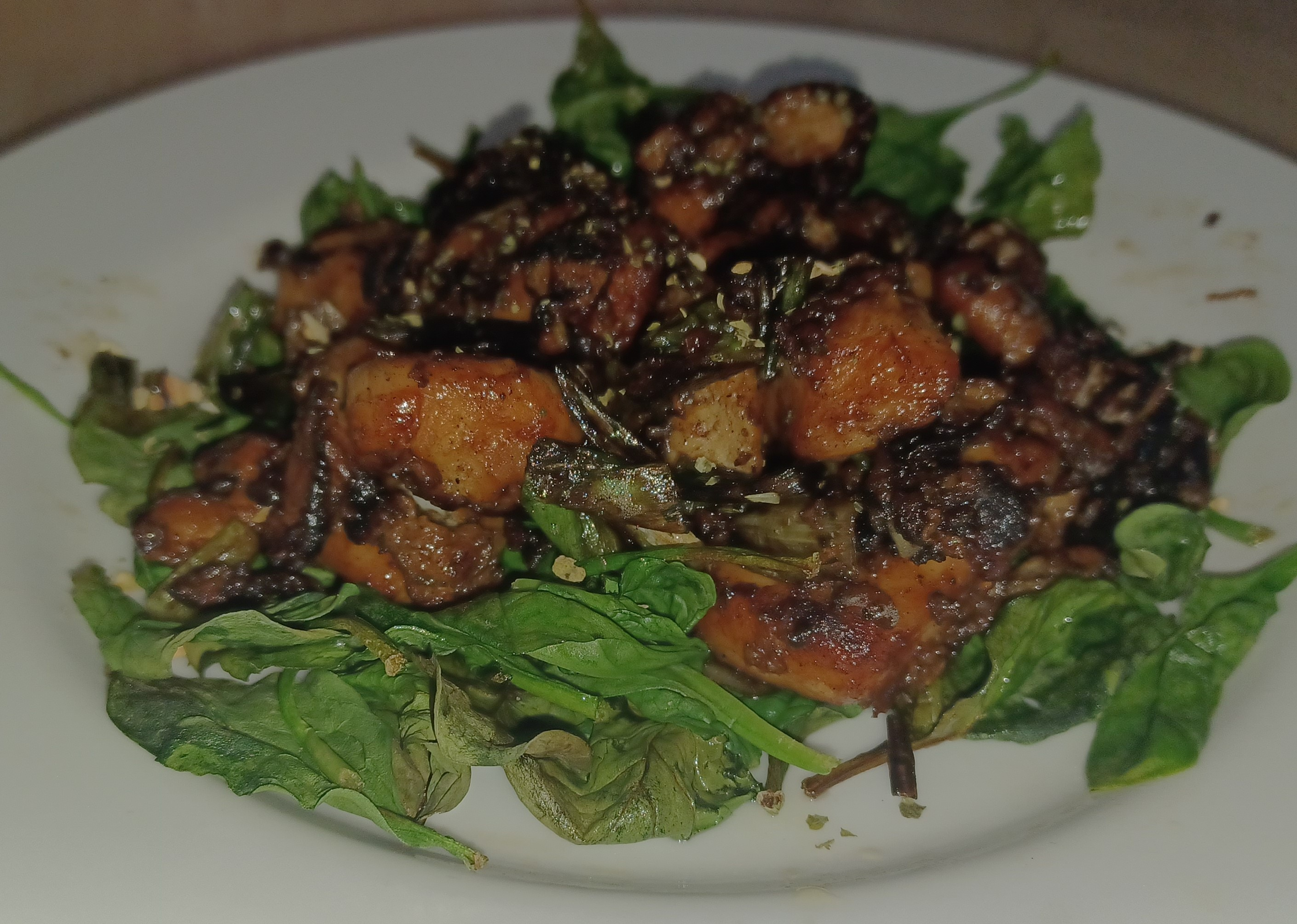
- An air-fried version of the Sichuan pepper chicken, prepared in the United States made by a home cooker of Teochewnese descent.
- Alternative names: Chin jiew chicken
- Type: Entree
- Region or state: Teochew
- Associated cuisine: Chinese
- Main ingredients: Chicken
- Ingredients generally used: Sichuan peppercorns, fish sauce, Lysimachia clethroides
- Similar dishes: Three cup chicken

Sichuan pepper chicken (simplified Chinese: 川椒鸡; traditional Chinese: 川椒雞; pinyin: Chuānjiāo jī; lit. 'Sichuan pepper chicken'; Teochew: cuang1 zio1 goi1), also known as chin jiew chicken, is a deep-fried chicken dish in Teochew cuisine, typically cooked with leafy green called pearl vegetable (珍珠菜, Lysimachia clethroides). Outside of China, basil, mint, spinach, and other leafy green vegetables are used as substitutes for this vegetable in preparing the dish. The dish is also known for its use of fish sauce and Sichuan peppercorns, the dish's namesake.

== See also ==
- Teochew cuisine
