= Hao kuih =

Chinese Snack

Hao Kuih (鲎粿)/Hou Guo
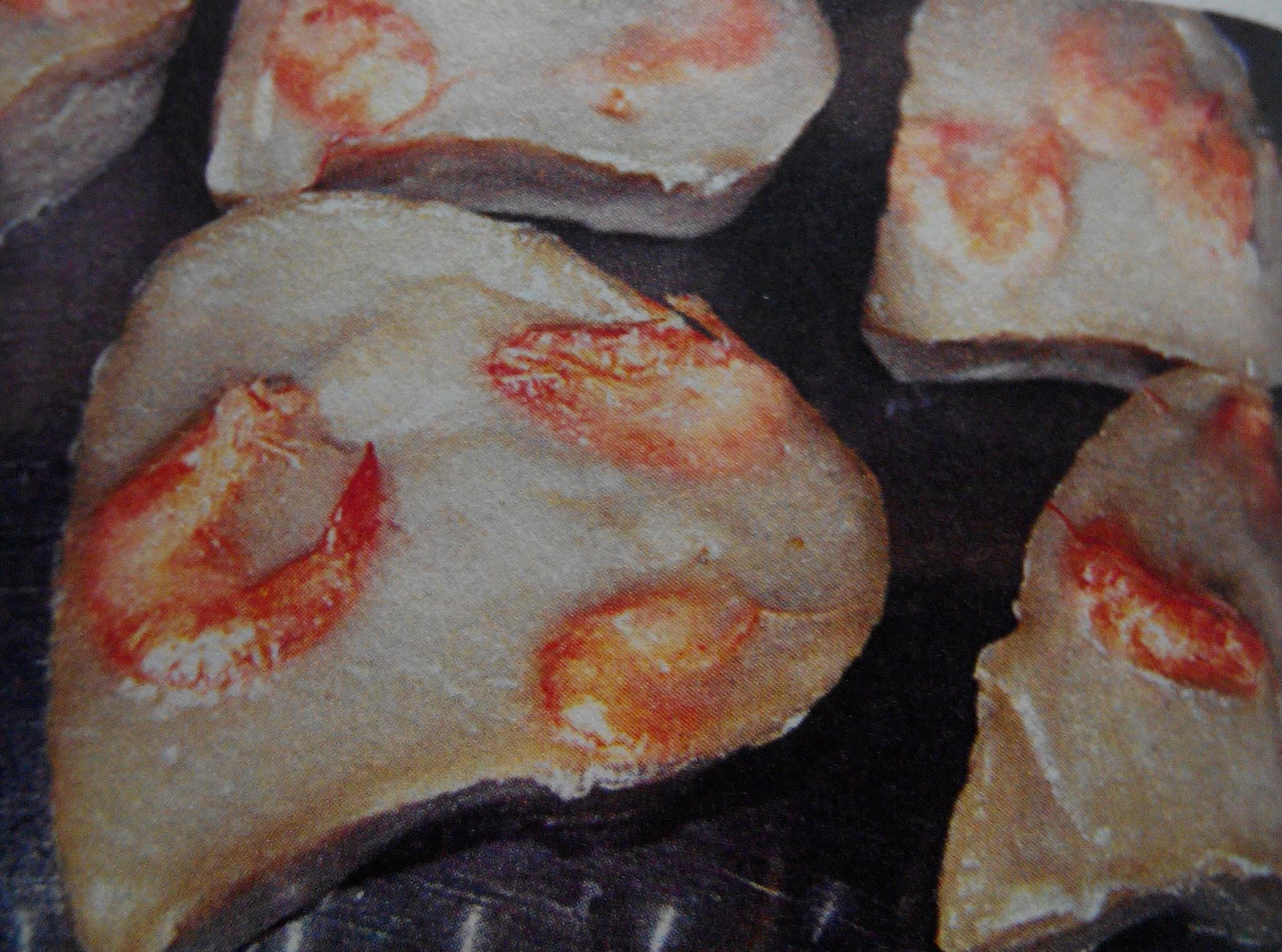
- Featured Snack in Shantou
- Alternative names: limulus cake
- Course: Snack
- Place of origin: Chaoyang District
- Region or state: Shantou City, Guangdong Province, China.
- Main ingredients: Flour and sweet potato flour, seafood

Hao kuih (Chinese: 鱟粿) is a traditional snack originating from Shantou, Guangdong Province, China. Characterized by its distinctive shape and savory flavor, it is primarily associated with Chaoshan cuisine.

The dish is believed to have first appeared in Chaoyang District in Shantou, and remains a regional specialty. While popular within the Chaoshan community, it is relatively uncommon outside this cultural region.

Hao kuih is notable for its unique preparation and ingredients, which typically include rice flour, savory fillings, and occasionally horseshoe crab eggs (from which its name derives, as "鱟" refers to the horseshoe crab). It is often steamed or fried, resulting in a soft yet textured consistency.

== Kuih – Cake ==
=== Worship traditions in Chaoshan ===
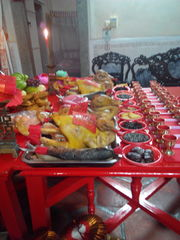
A feast for gods

Chaoshan culture emphasizes communal quality of life as a primary value. This ethos is deeply integrated with the region's long-standing tradition of folk religion. In Chaonan District in Shantou, many counties hold festivals for the gods. One such festival is observed as a day of homage to the deities and is a day of great importance to the Shantou people. On the day of the festival, villagers prepare a large feast and hold a ceremony for the gods as a way of thanking them for their blessings. Following the ceremony, the villagers share the feast with their friends and families. In this context, the event transcends its religious origins to become a significant period for strengthening interpersonal relationships.One of the dishes prepared is kuih (粿). Kuih is synthesized from a base of rice flour or glutinous rice flour, frequently supplemented with sweet potato flour or tapioca starch to achieve a distinctively elastic and dense consistency. While the term is often translated into English as "cake", kuih represents a broad culinary category that includes steamed puddings, dumplings, and savory pastries. Unlike Western cakes, which typically rely on wheat flour and leavening agents to create a light, airy crumb, kuih is predominantly gluten-free and characterized by a moist, "pudding-like" yet firm texture. Kuih plays a role in many traditional Chaoshan activities of worship and is frequently used as an offering to the gods in exchange for their blessings.

=== A variety of kuih ===
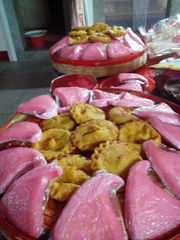
Tao kuih: "Tao" means peach in Chinese therefore Tao kuih is in the shape of a peach. Always with rice and peanuts in it, Red Tao kuih usually means good luck.

Though the basic ingredients are similar, not all kuih is the same. Kuih can be savory or sweet, and is created in a size, shape, or color that carries symbolic meaning for the celebration at hand.

- Tao kuih (红桃粿): Adding edible red pigment, Tao kuih is a symbol of good luck.
- Shuke kuih (鼠壳粿): This version contains cudweed herb (鼠曲草), which helps relieve cough and reduce sputum.
- Puzi kuih (朴子粿): Also called Hackberry cake, it is made of rice flour and Hackberry leaves and carries the fresh aroma of the hackberry plant. It is green in color and primarily made in special molds.
- Shuijing kuih (水晶粿): Also called Crystal Ball, Shuijing kuih has a transparent appearance that makes it possible to see the fillings inside. It is made of sweet potato flour.
- Radish kuih (菜头粿): Usually made in winter, especially on Spring Festival, Radish kuih brings about a feeling of warmth.
- Taro kuih (芋粿): Similar to Radish kuih, Taro kuih is made of taro and flour.

== Stories of hao kuih ==
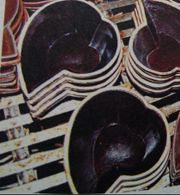
The molds used for shapping.It is in the shape of limulus.

According to regional folklore, an elderly noblewoman in the Chaoyang region suffered from tooth loss, chronic indigestion, and flatulence. Utilizing the savory extract of horseshoe crab meat, believed in traditional local medicine to aid digestion, the daughter-in-law incorporated the sauce into a soft, steamed rice paste, later named Hao kuih (lit. "horseshoe crab cake"). The dish reportedly improved the woman’s health. The recipe was prized for its distinctive taste and ease of consumption. Today, Hao kuih remains a celebrated specialty in Shantou, enduring as a symbol of regional culinary tradition.

An alternative historical account attributes the popularization of hao kuih to an official named Shi Bosheng. During his tenure as a county administrator, the region’s coastal agriculture reportedly suffered from an infestation of horseshoe crabs (limulus), which caused significant damage to local crops. To mitigate the agricultural crisis, Shi instructed the populace to integrate the crab meat into rice paste to create hao kuih.

== "Hao" and limulus ==
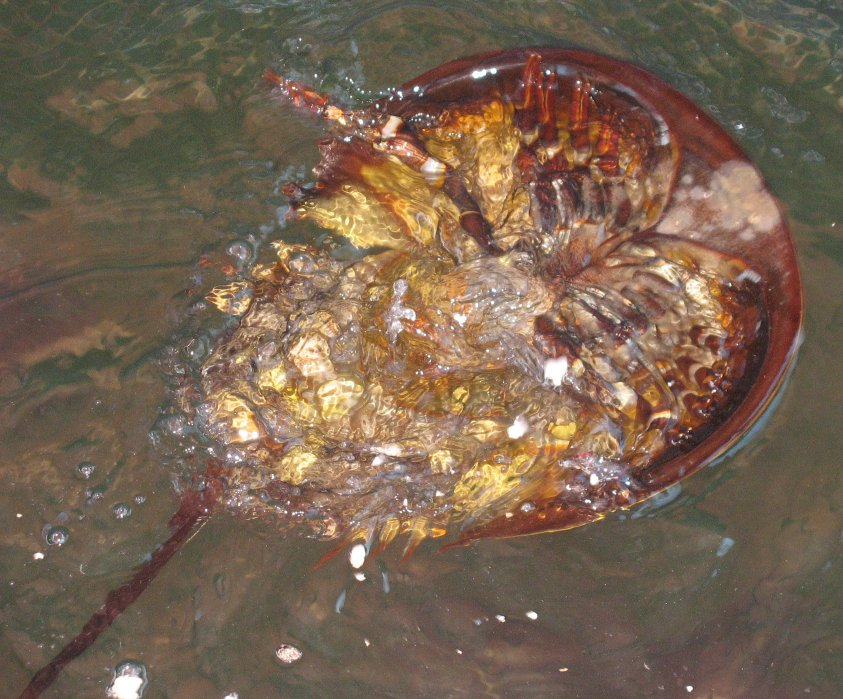
Limulus always appears in pair. Some experienced fishers say that a female limulus always carries a male one on her back because the female is bigger than the male one.

Hao (Teochew dialect pronunciation) is limulus. Limulus is an ancient animal which has existed for a history and is called the “living fossil”. Therefore, the preservation of limulus is to protect species diversity. So far, Limulus in Chaoshan area has been under the protection since it was listed as the second category in endangered species.

Phylum	Class	Order	Family	Genus
Arthropoda	Chelicerata	Xiphosura	Limulidae	Tachypleus

In old days, Chaoshan people caught limulus and cooked them to make sauce, which is like caviar in western countries. Limulus sauce also has special medical function for digestion. However, limulus is also poisonous. After knowing its fatal poison and its decreasing number, people begin to stop killing limulus.

== Today’s hao kuih ==
Hao kuih is originally made of limulus sauce and rice flour and with the filling of meat and vegetables. Since people stop killing limulus, they use some seafood like shrimp to replace it. So the hao kuih we eat today is different from the original one. But they pass down the traditional methods. The hao kuih also keep the shape of limulus only without the limulus sauce. People use barbecue sauce to improve its flavor. The Barbecue sauce in Chaoshan area is called Shacha sauce (沙茶酱). As a primary Chinese condiment, Shacha sauce is usually used in Fujian, Teochew and Taiwanese cuisine. It is made from many ingredients, including soybean oil, garlic, shallots, chilies, brill fish, dried shrimps. So it has a savory and slightly spicy taste.

== The Process of Making hao kuih ==
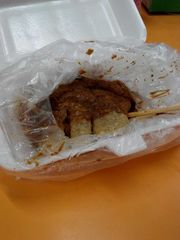
Covering with Shacha sauce

Traditionally, people use local potato flour, rice and limulus sauce to make hao kuih.

1. Cook porridge and then cool it down.
2. Add potato flour, limulus sauce into it and then stir them evenly.
3. Pour the ingredient mixture into the china molds.
4. Add some fresh shrimps and minced meat on the top and begin to cook them.
5. After they are done, take them out of the mold and fry them in oil.
6. When the hao kuih has a gold cover, it is the best time for taste.

== See also ==
- Kuih
- Limulus
