= Fun guo =

Chinese steamed dumplings

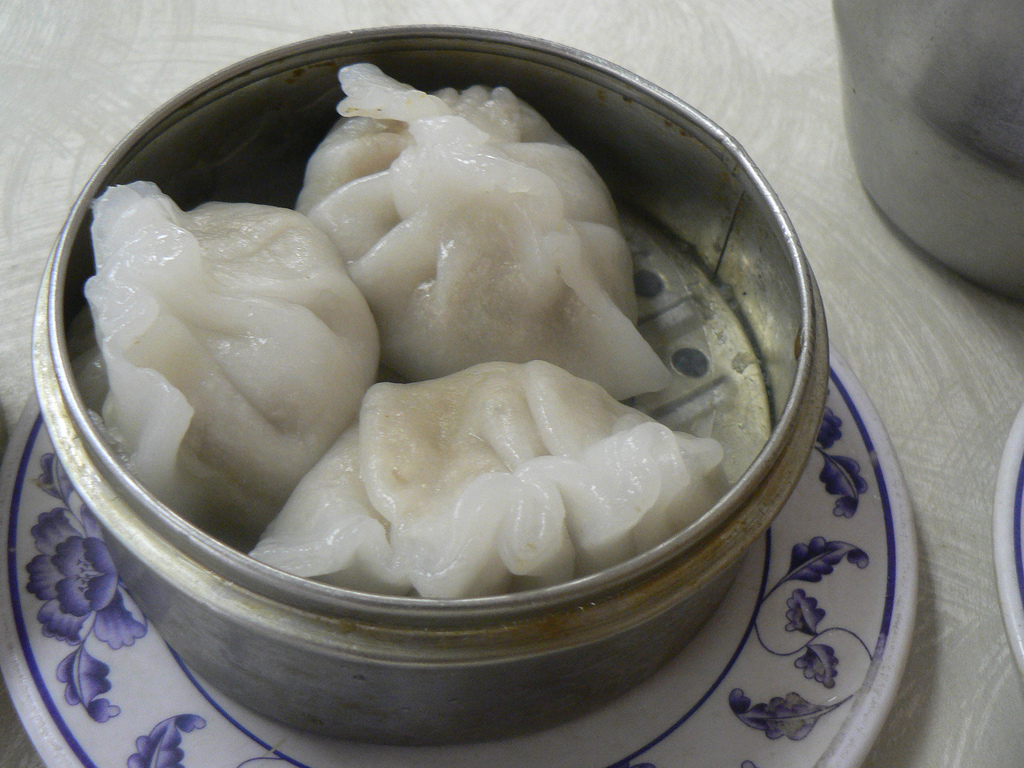
- A steaming tray with three fun guo
- Alternative names: Chaozhou fun guo, fun quor, fun gor, fen guo, Chiu Chow dumpling, Teochew dumpling, hung gue, fun kor
- Course: Yum cha
- Place of origin: Chaoshan area, Guangdong, Southern China
- Created by: Teochew people
- Main ingredients: Filling: chopped peanuts, garlic chives, ground pork, dried shrimp, dried radish and shiitake mushrooms Wrap: de-glutenized wheat flour, tapioca flour, and corn or potato starch

Fun guo
- Traditional Chinese: 潮州粉粿
Transcriptions
Standard Mandarin
- Hanyu Pinyin: Cháozhōu fěnguǒ
Yue: Cantonese
- Jyutping: Ciu4 jau1 fan2 gwo2
Southern Min
- Hokkien POJ: Tiô-chiu-hún-kué, Tiô-chiu-hún-ké

Fun guo, or Chaozhou fun guo (潮州粉粿), sometimes spelled fun quor, fun gor, fen guo, Chiu Chow dumpling, Teochew dumpling, or fun kor, is a variety of steamed dumpling from the Chaoshan area of coastal eastern Guangdong, a province in Southern China. Fun guo looks very similar to har gaw (shrimp dumplings) in Cantonese-style dim sum.

== Teochew cuisine ==
In the Chaozhou dialect of Min Nan, the dumplings are called hung gue (粉餜), but they are more widely known by their Cantonese name. They are also eaten in non-Chaozhou regions of Guangdong.

The fillings of Chaozhou fun guo are peanuts, jícama, leaf celery (唐芹), sweet preserved radish, chopped fresh garlic chives, minced pork and dried shrimps.

== Hawaiian cuisine ==
In Hawaii, fun guo is known as pepeiao, the Hawaiian word for ear, because it resembles an ear.

== See also ==
- Chaozhou cuisine
- Dim sum
