= Tao kuih =

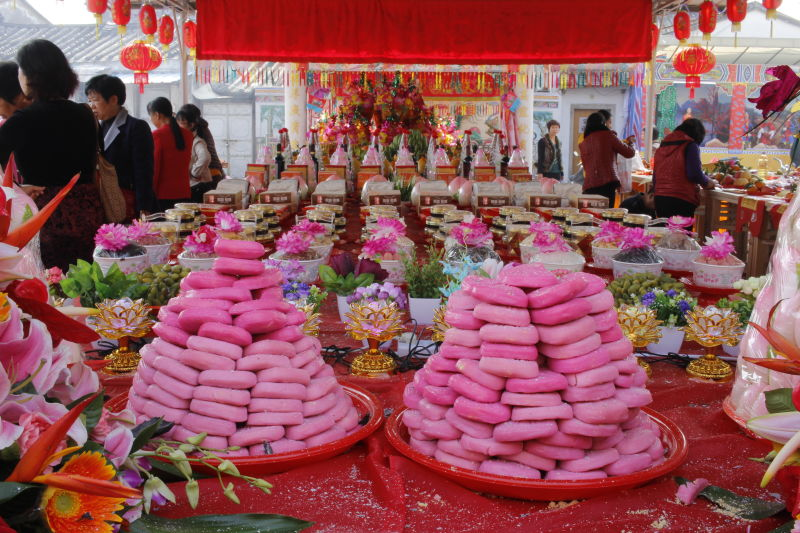
Tao kuih offered as gifts in times of celebration

Tao kuih (Chinese: 红桃粿) is a kind of traditional food in Chaoshan area, Guangdong, China. Tao means peach in Chinese and kuih (粿) is a general name of a class of food, which is made from rice flour, flour and tapioca. “净米也，又米食也” is the explanation of kuih from Kangxi Dictionary. In Chaoshan area, the housewife always make tao kuih in some big festivals, such as Spring Festival, Lantern Festival, Double Ninth Festival and so on. Tao kuih uses to sacrifice to ancestors. Tao kuih gets its name because people think it looks like a red peach. It is made for worship. In China, red peach symbolizes longevity and luck, it reflects people's aspiration when they pray.

== Ingredients ==
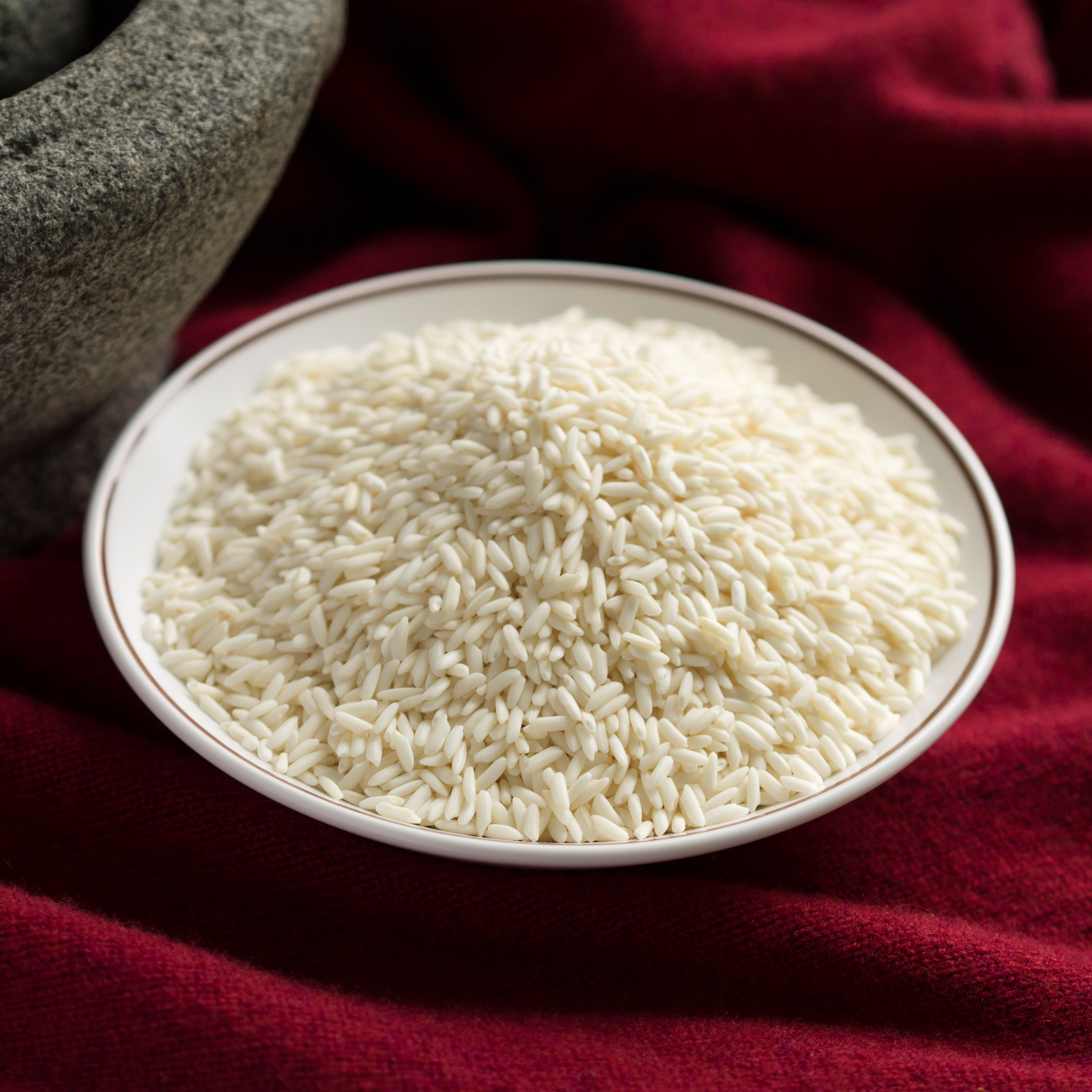
Glutinous rice is the main material of Tao kuih.

Main ingredients include rice flour, glutinous rice, mushroom, tiniest shrimps, peanut, garlic, pork, etc. Additional ingredients can include MSG, pepper, oil, salt, etc.

== Nutritional value ==
Glutinous rice is the main filling of tao kuih, which contains proteins, fat, saccharides, starch, calcium, F, Fe, vitamin B_{1}, and vitamin B_{2}.

== kuih mould ==
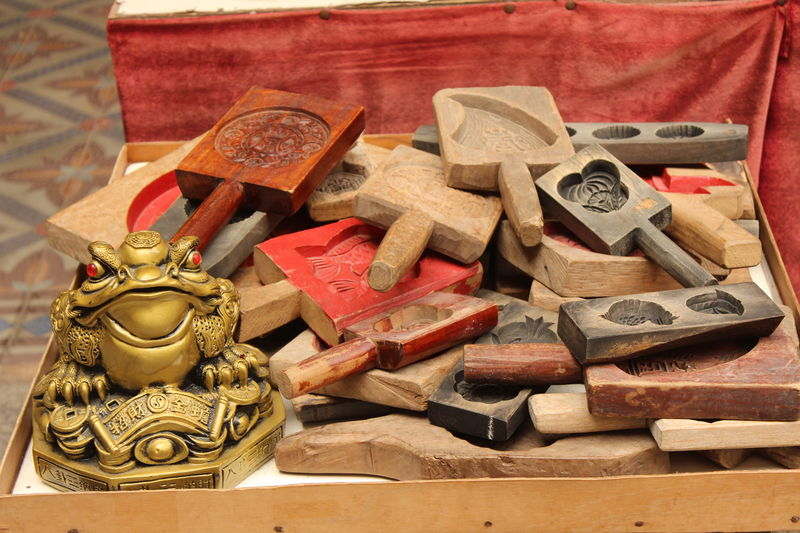
Tao kuih mould

Tao kuih always have beautiful patterns on it because of tao kuih mould. Tao kuih moulds have various kinds of patterns in different area, which is mainly make from peach woods. Peaches also reflect longevity and good marriage, and most of the tao kuih will have a 寿 (longevity) or 福 (luck) Chinese character on it. The patterns of those moulds are always very exquisite, so peach wooden moulds need to be carved carefully. It had developed to be a kind of engraving art, which enriches Chinese carving culture.

== See also ==
- Red peach cake
