= Rempah udang =

Peranakan dumpling dessert

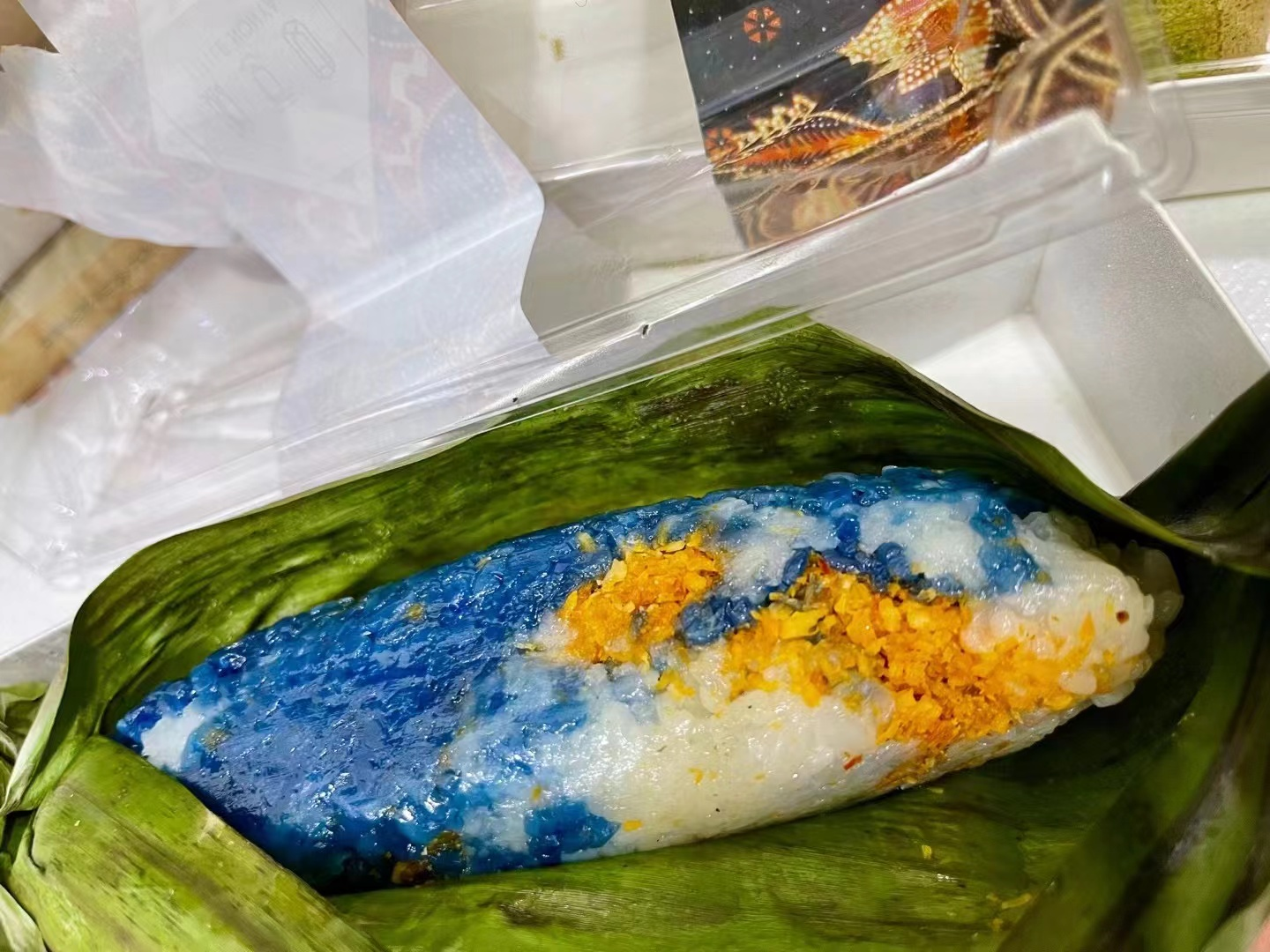
Rempah Udang made by Little Nonya in Shanghai

Rempah udang is a traditional Peranakan dumpling dessert snack (kueh or kuih). It is usually made from glutinous rice and hae bee hiam, a dry spiced sambal composed primarily of dried shrimp, desiccated coconut shavings, chilli, lemongrass, and other spices, all wrapped in a pandan or banana leaf.

== Description ==
Rempah udang typically comes as an oblong-shaped glutinous rice roll, filled in the middle with hae bee hiam. The rice used is mixed with coconut milk and is sometimes coloured with the blue pea flower. It is similar to the Indonesian lemper.
