= Hae bee hiam =

Dry spiced sambal with dried shrimp

Hae bee hiam (Hokkien: 蝦米薟, POJ: hê-bí-hiam) is a traditional dry spiced sambal with dried shrimp (hae bee, Hokkien: 蝦米, POJ: hê-bí, lit. “shrimp/prawn rice”). It is usually made from small dried shrimp, desiccated coconut shavings, chilli, tamarind (asam), lemongrass, peppercorns, shallots, garlic, turmeric, galangal, and various other spices, traditionally combined by roughly pounding in a mortar and pestle before frying.

Hae bee hiam is used as a condiment or ingredient; for example, as the filling in rempah udang.
