= Red peach cake =

Chinese pastry

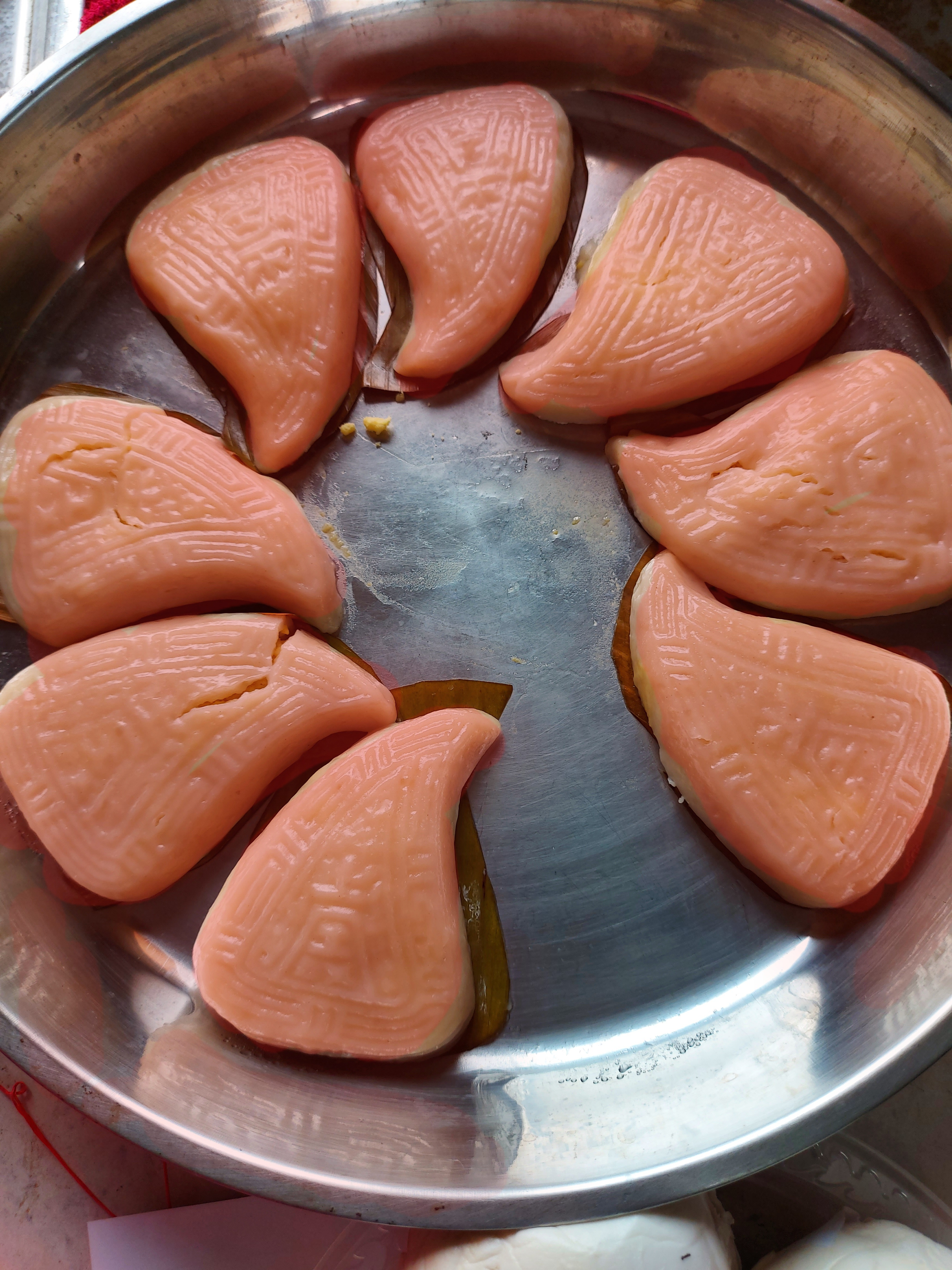
- Assorted Teochew kueh, with pink and white red peach cakes on the right
- Alternative names: Png kuih, png tho kuih, ang tho kuih
- Type: Pastry
- Course: Snack
- Place of origin: China
- Region or state: China and Southeast Asia
- Main ingredients: Glutinous rice flour, mushrooms, shallots, peanuts

Red peach cake (Chinese: 紅桃粿; Pe̍h-ōe-jī: âng-thô-kóe), also known as rice peach cake (Chinese: 飯桃粿; Pe̍h-ōe-jī: pn̄g-thô-kóe) and rice cake (Chinese: 飯粿; Pe̍h-ōe-jī: pn̄g-kóe) is a small teardrop shaped Teochew kuih (stuffed dumpling) with soft sticky glutinous rice flour skin wrapped over a filling of glutinous rice, peanuts, mushrooms, and shallots. The skin of the kuih is often dyed pink, and shaped with a wooden mould before steaming. The cake is native to the Teochew people.
