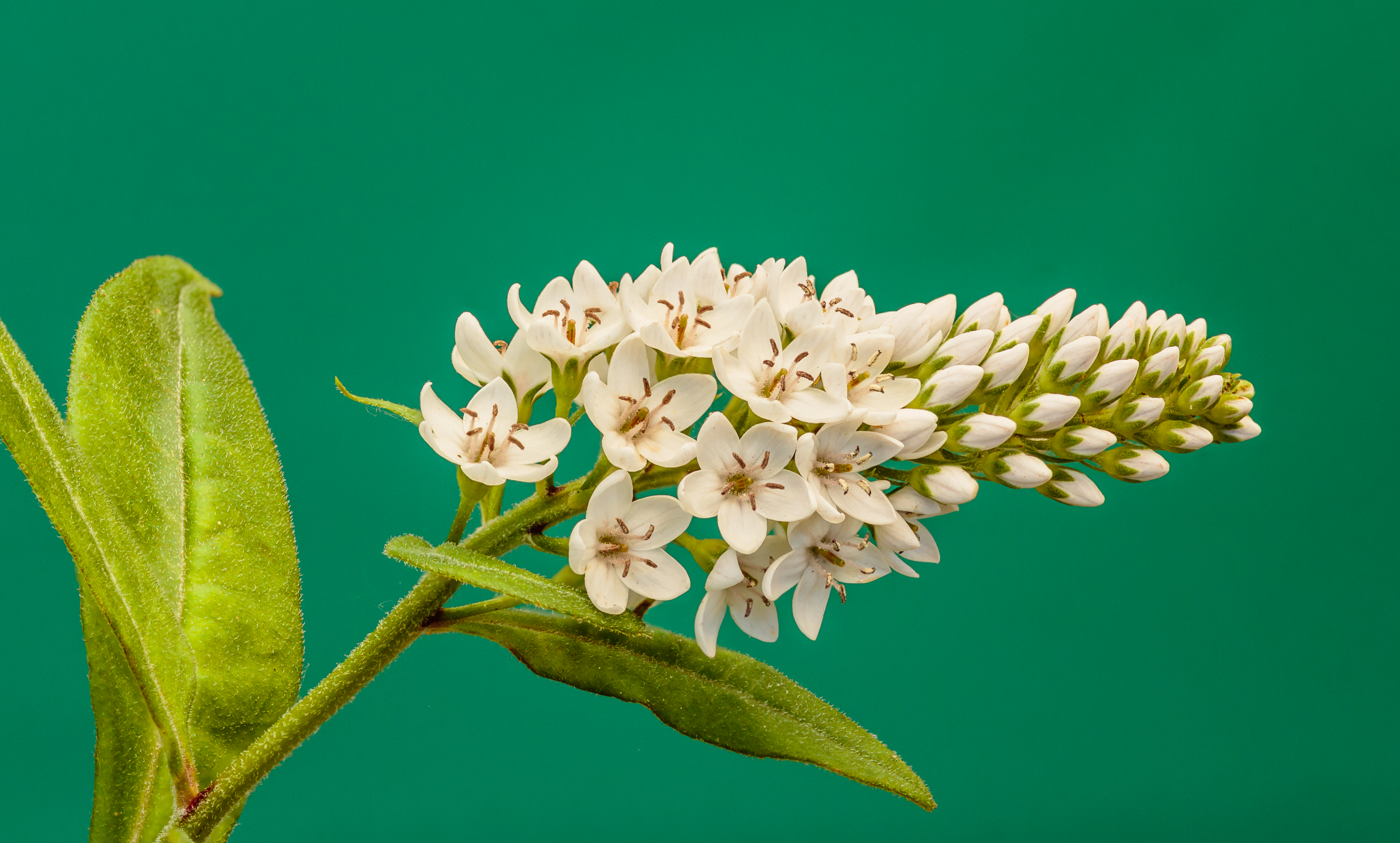
- Close-up on flowers of Lysimachia clethroides

Scientific classification
- Kingdom: Plantae
- Clade: Tracheophytes
- Clade: Angiosperms
- Clade: Eudicots
- Clade: Asterids
- Order: Ericales
- Family: Primulaceae
- Genus: Lysimachia
- Species: L. clethroides

Binomial name
- Lysimachia clethroides Duby

= Lysimachia clethroides =

Species of flowering plant

Lysimachia clethroides, the gooseneck loosestrife, is a species of flowering plant, traditionally classified in the family Primulaceae. It was transferred to the family Myrsinaceae based on a molecular phylogenetic study, but this family was later merged into the Primulaceae.

== Description ==
Lysimachia clethroides can reach heights of 60–100 cm (24–39 in). This hardy herbaceous perennial resembles a tall speedwell. The stem is upright and rigid. The leaves are scattered, alternate, oblong or broadly lanceolate, about 5 cm wide, 7 to 11 cm long, with entire margins. The flowers are tiny (1.2 cm wide), grouped in terminal spikes, each flower being snow white, with five petals. The inflorescence is bent with a sparsely haired axis, reaching a length of 22 to 24 cm. It flowers throughout summer. This plant forms underground stolons. It is a pioneer plant in its natural range.

The specific epithet clethroides means "like alder" (Clethra).

== Distribution and habitat ==
The native range of this plant is China and Japan. It is also found in Russia, Korea, and North America. It is present in damp woodland margins, wet ravines and forests, sunny grassy hills, and mountain slopes at elevations of 300–2,100 m (980–6,890 ft) above sea level. It prefers deep, rich loam and sheltered positions.

This plant has gained the Royal Horticultural Society's Award of Garden Merit.

== Use in culinary and traditional medicine ==
In China, most commonly in Chaoshan region, leaves from lysimachia clethroides are used in cuisine as leaf vegetable, for making salads, stir-fried dishes, or soups. Leafy greens from the plant are known as pearl vegetable, and they contain low sodium and high potassium. In medicine, lysimachia clethroides is also known as dwarf peach, pearl grass, regulating grass, the ridge grass, ji cocktail, labor injury medicine, stretch lotion, and nine lotus. It is used to treat diarrhea, bruises, sore throat, heat exhaustion, and edema.

== Gallery ==
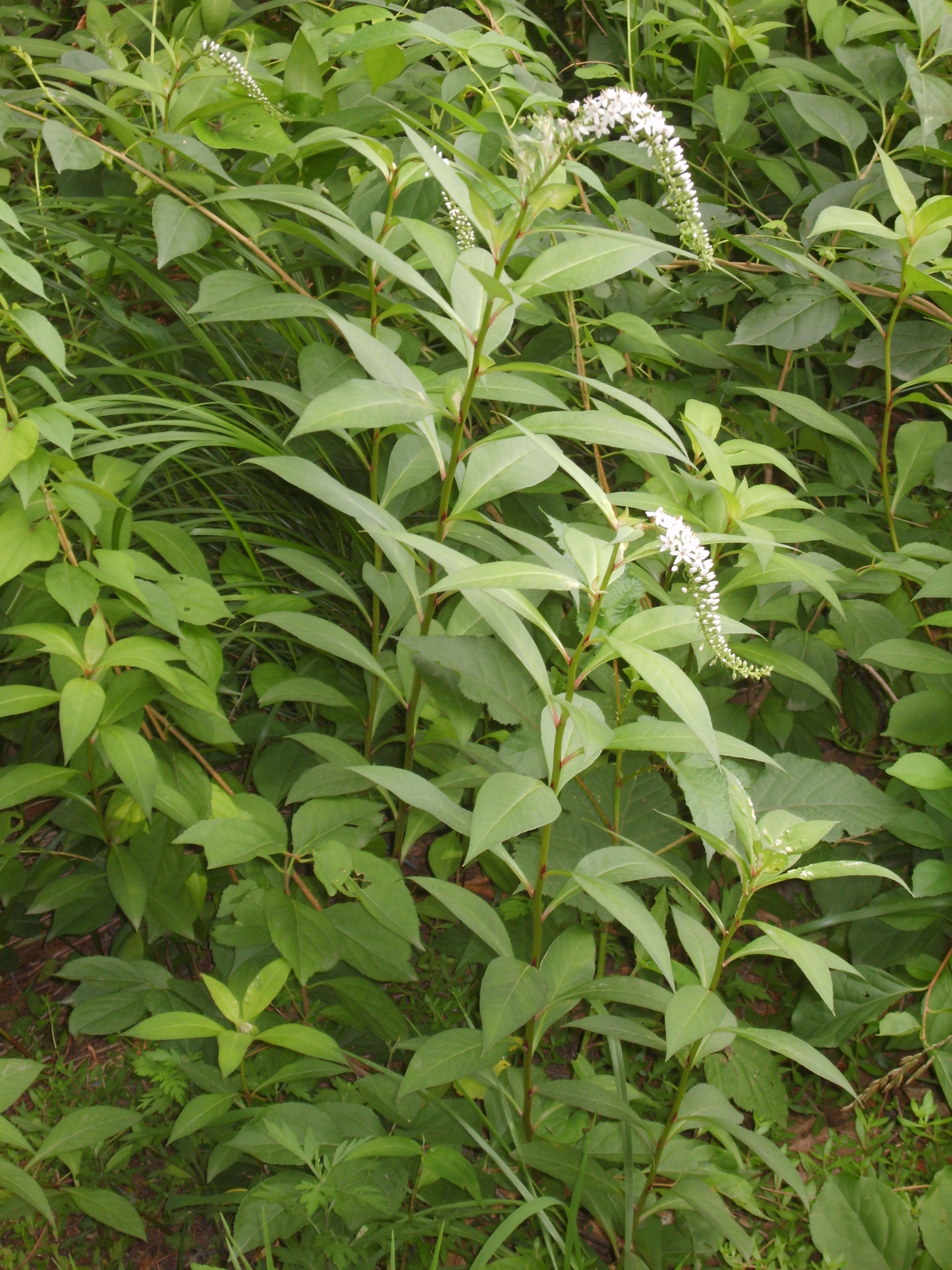
Plants

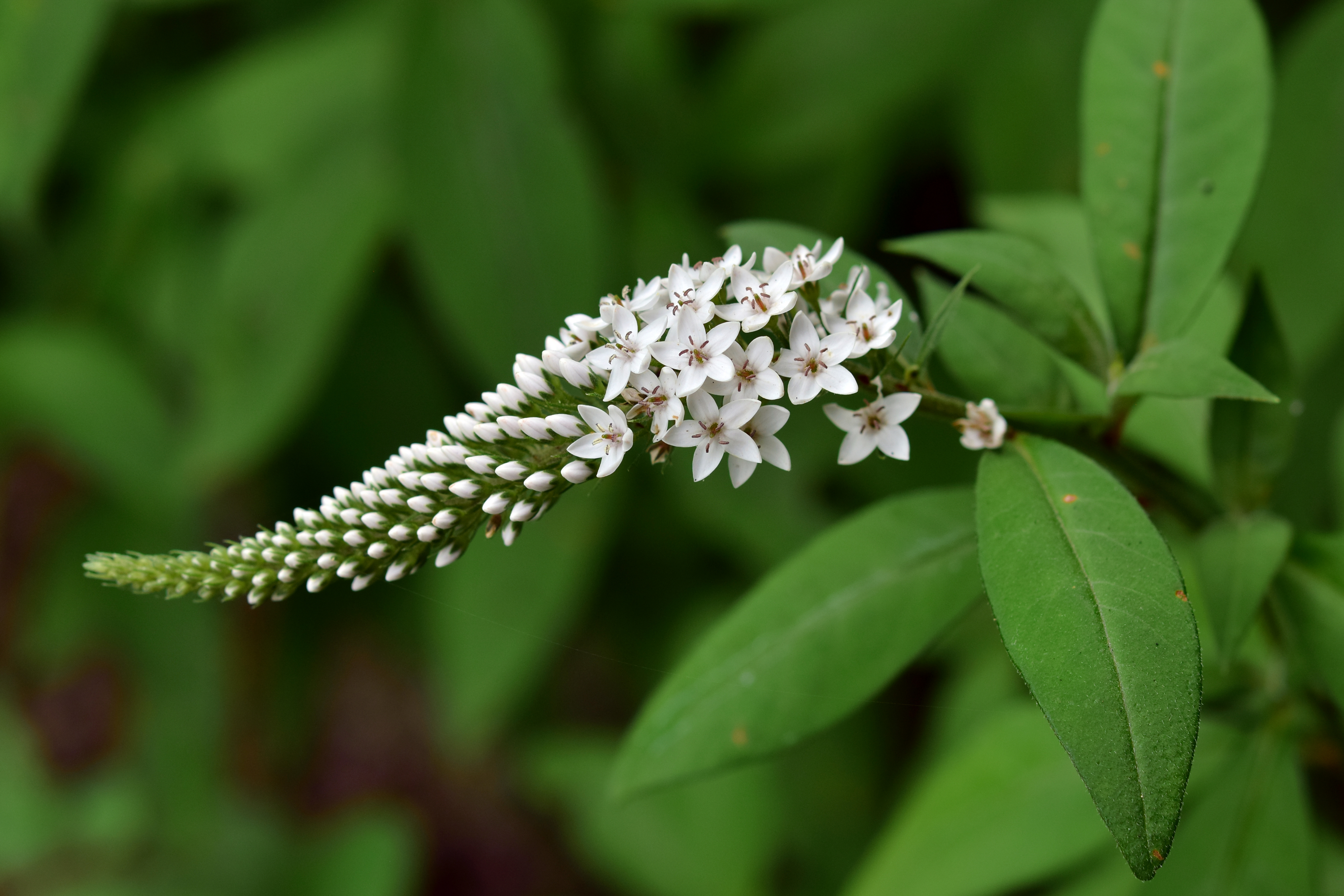
Inflorescence

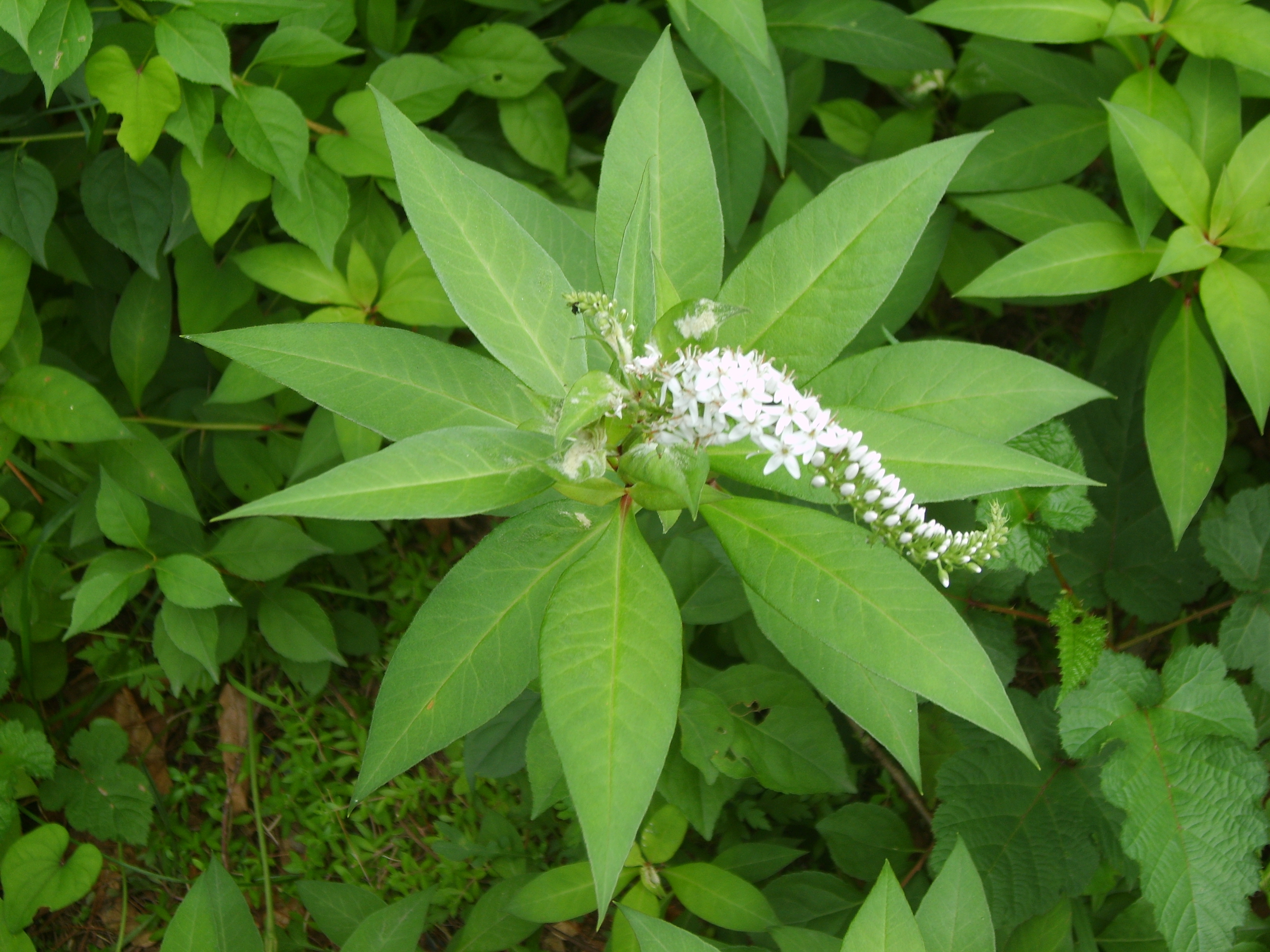
Leaves

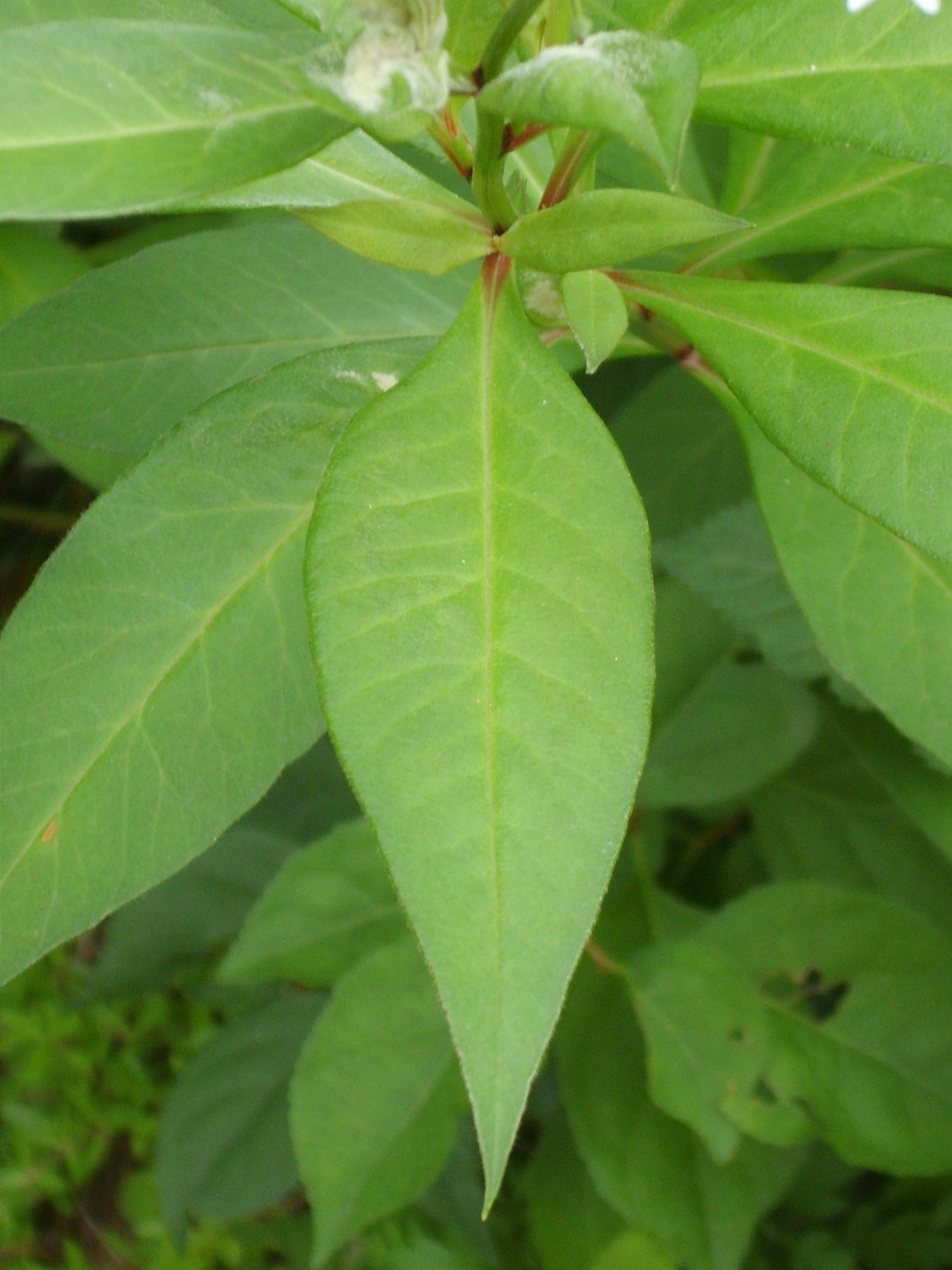
Close-up on a leaf

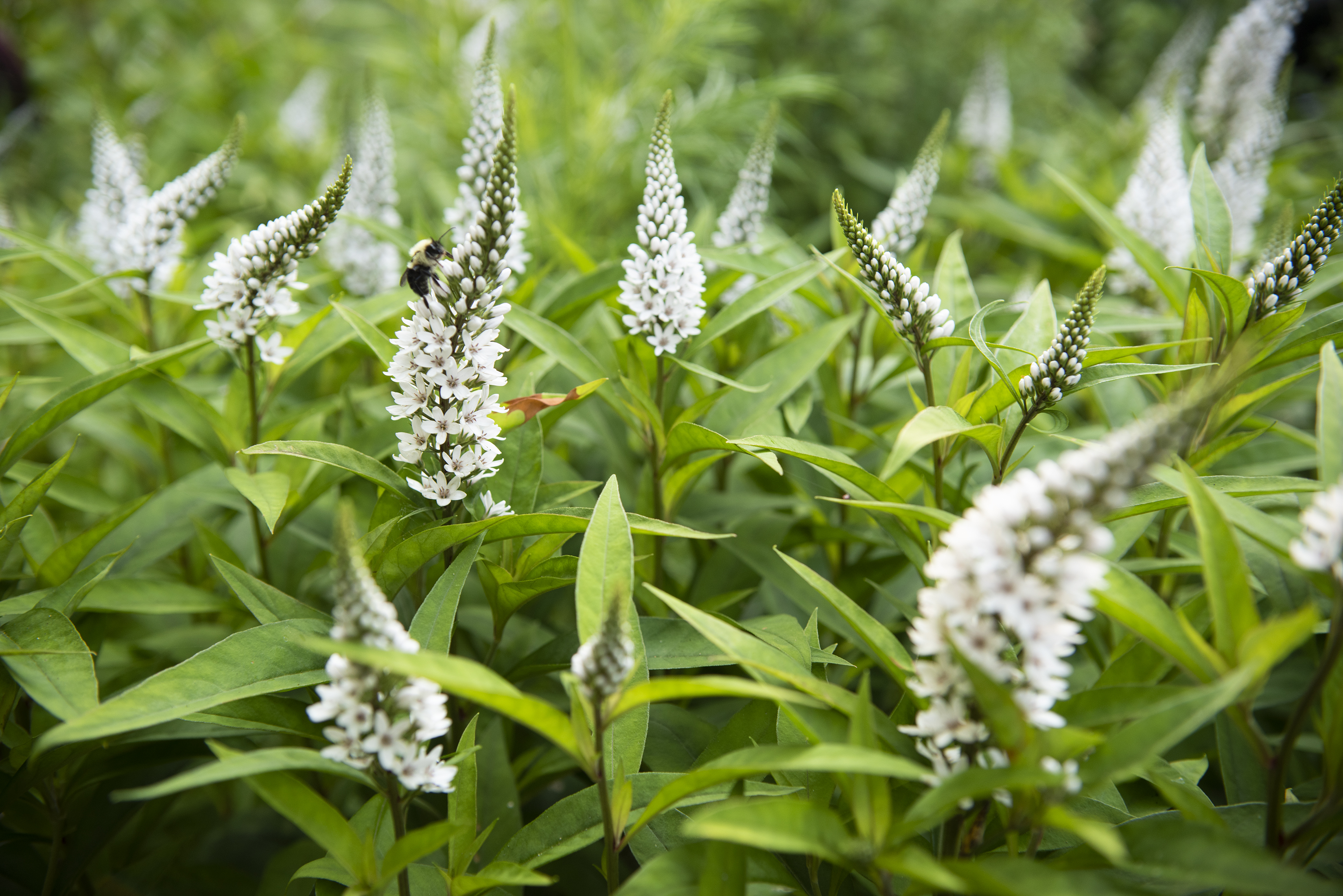
Bumblebee on Lysimachia clethroides
