= List of Singaporean dishes =

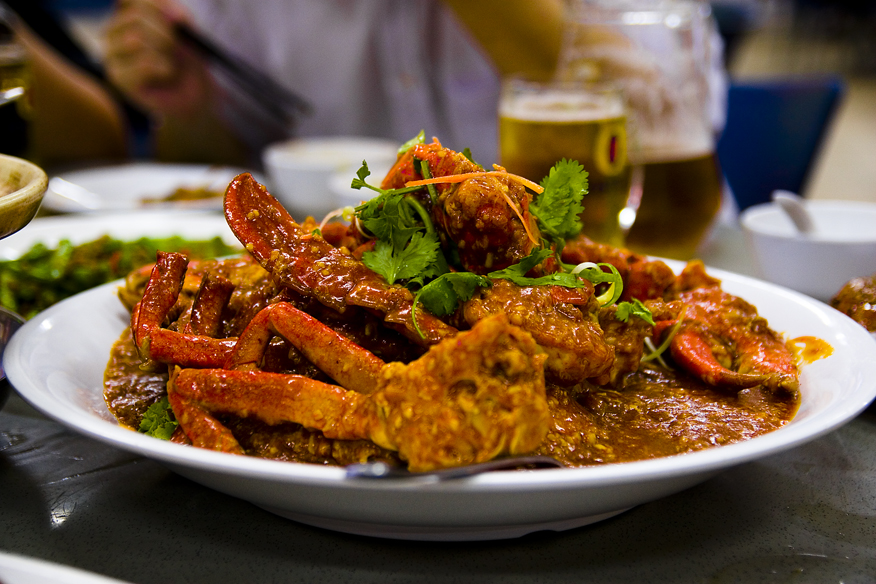
Chilli crab, Singapore's national dish

This is a list of Singaporean dishes.

Singaporean cuisine includes both unique dishes and others that, while sharing names with dishes in other cuisines, have evolved to mean something distinctly different in Singapore.

== Noodle dishes ==
Name	Image	Type	Description
Beef Kway Teow		Noodle dish	Flat rice flour (kway teow) noodles stir-fried with beef, served dry or with soup
Beef noodle soup		Noodle dish	Chinese noodle soup made of stewed or red braised beef, beef broth and vegetables.
Mee pok		Noodle dish	Noodle dish with Chinese noodle characterized by its flat and yellow appearance, varying in thickness and width.
Banmian		Noodle dish	Hand-made flat noodles served with vegetables, minced meat, sliced mushrooms, and an egg in an anchovy (ikan bilis)-based soup.
Char kway teow		Noodle dish	Flat rice flour (kuay teow) noodles stir-fried in dark soy sauce with prawns, eggs, beansprouts, fish cake, cockles, green leafy vegetables, Chinese sausage, and lard.
Crab bee hoon		Noodle dish	Singapore rice vermicelli dish with whole mud crab served in a claypot and spiced milky broth.
Fish soup bee hoon		Noodle dish	Singaporean soup-based seafood dish, served hot usually with bee hoon. The dish is viewed as a healthy food in Singapore.
Hokkien mee		Noodle dish	A stir-fried dish of egg noodles and rice noodles in a fragrant stock.
Kwetiau goreng		Noodle dish	Southeast Asia stir fried flat rice noodles.
Shredded chicken noodles		Noodle dish	Noodle dish topped with shredded chicken, fish dumpling and mushroom.
Vegetarian bee hoon		Noodle dish	Singaporean noodle dish which comprises vegetarian spring rolls, fried tofu skin, and mock meats made from gluten.
Mee rebus		Noodle dish	The dish is made of yellow egg noodles, which are also used in Hokkien mee, with a spicy slightly sweet curry-like gravy.
Mee siam		Noodle dish	The dish served with spicy, sweet and sour light gravy. The gravy is made from a rempah spice paste, tamarind and taucheo (salted soy bean).
Mee soto		Noodle dish	Spicy noodle soup dish.
Katong Laksa		Noodle dish	Katong Laksa is a variant of laksa lemak inspired by the Straits Chinese who live in the Katong area, Singapore. It has a spicy soup stock the colour of a flaming sunset, flavoured with coconut milk and dried shrimp, and topped with ingredients like cockles, prawns and fishcake. The noodles are normally cut up into smaller pieces so that the entire dish can be eaten with a spoon alone, without chopsticks or a fork.
Mee goreng		Noodle dish	Thin yellow noodles fried in cooking oil with garlic, onion or shallots, fried prawn, chicken, pork, beef, or sliced bakso (meatballs), chili, Chinese cabbage, cabbages, tomatoes, egg, and other vegetables.
Satay bee hoon		Noodle dish	Satay bee hoon sauce is a chilli-based peanut sauce very similar to the one served with satay. The satay sauce is spread on top of rice vermicelli.
Curry chicken noodles		Noodle dish	Usually contains chicken meat and tau pok, and uses curry as soup base coupled with yellow noodles.

== Main dishes ==
Name	Image	Type	Description
Hainanese Curry Rice		Rice dish	Hainanese Curry Rice is a dish consisting of plenty of steamed white rice smothered in a mess of curries and braised pork gravy.
Bak kut teh		Meat dish	Meat dish cooked in broth
Chai tow kway		Rice dish	Common dish or dim sum of Teochew cuisine
Drunken prawn		Seafood	Prawns cooked with Chinese rice wine
Char siu		Meat dish	Barbecued pork in Cantonese cuisine.
Duck rice		Rice dish	Singaporean Chinese meat dish, made of either braised or roasted duck and plain white rice. The braised duck is usually cooked with yam and shrimps; it can be served simply with plain white rice and a thick dark sauce; side dishes of braised hard-boiled eggs, preserved salted vegetables, or hard beancurd may be added.
Har Cheong Gai		Meat dish	Chicken wings fried in a batter with fermented shrimp paste.
Pig's brain soup		Meat dish	a soup dish comprising pig brain with special herbs.
Pig fallopian tubes		Meat dish	Pig fallopian tubes (Sang Cheong) are used as an ingredient in some Singaporean dishes.
Pig's organ soup		Meat dish	The dish is a clear and refreshing soup; the reason why sometimes referred just as chheng-thng, served with other optional side dishes as well as rice.
Sliced fish soup		Seafood dish	Sliced fish soup is a dish in Singapore.
Teochew Porridge		Rice dish	Rice porridge dish accompanied with various small plates of side dishes. Singapore Teowchew-style rice porridge is plain, simply cooked and not flavoured at all by the stock it's cooked in.
Turtle soup		Turtle dish	Turtle soup is soup or stews made from the flesh of the turtle. The dish exists in some cultures and is viewed as a luxury or delicacy.
Assam pedas		Seafood dish	Seafood and vegetables cooked in a sauce consisting of tamarind, coconut milk, chilli, and spices.
Ayam penyet		Meat dish	Fried chicken dish consisting of fried chicken that is smashed with the pestle against mortar to make it softer, served with sambal, slices of cucumbers, fried tofu and tempeh.
Dendeng paru		Meat dish	Dish of dried beef lung cooked in spices.
Gudeg Putih		Vegetable dish	White jackfruit curry
Gulai daun ubi		Vegetable dish	Sweet potato leaves stewed in coconut milk
Lemak siput		Shellfish	Shellfish cooked in a thick coconut milk-based gravy.
Nasi goreng		Rice dish	Stir-fried rice
Satay		Meat dish	Dish of seasoned, skewered and grilled meat, served with a sauce.
Sayur lodeh		Vegetable dish	Vegetables in coconut milk soup
Soto		Soup	Soup mainly composed of broth, meat and vegetables.
Soto ayam		Soup	Yellow spicy chicken soup.
Soup kambing		Soup	Tamil Muslims dish of spiced mutton soup
Soup tulang		Soup	Mutton or beef leg bones stewed in a spicy.
Fish head curry		Curry	The head of a red snapper is semi-stewed in a Kerala-style curry with assorted vegetables such as okra and eggplants.
Kari lemak ayam		Curry	Chicken curry with a coconut milk base
Kari debal		Soup	Eurasian Singaporean curry dish with Portuguese and Peranakan influences. Includes chicken, cabbage, sausage, and bacon pieces stewed in a curry sauce.
Cereal prawns		Seafood dish	Prawns that have been stir fried with sweetened cereal.
Black pepper crab		Seafood dish	It is made with hard-shell crabs, and fried with black pepper.
Chilli crab		Seafood dish	Singaporean seafood dish. Mud crabs are commonly used and are stir-fried in a semi-thick, sweet and savoury tomato and chilli based sauce.
Oyster omelette		Seafood dish	The dish consists of an omelette with a filling primarily composed of small oysters.
Hainanese chicken rice		Rice dish	It is based on a well-known Hainanese dish called Wenchang chicken.

== Snacks and desserts ==
Name	Image	Type	Description
Kaya toast		Snack	Kaya toast is prepared with kaya (coconut jam).
Roti john		Sandwich	Omelette sandwich from Singapore.
Curry puff		Snack	It is a small pie consisting of specialised curry with chicken and potatoes in a deep-fried or baked).
Pisang goreng		Snack	Snack food made of banana or plantain being deep fried in hot cooking oil.
Keropok		Snack	Deep fried crackers made from starch and other ingredients that serve as flavouring
Otak-otak		Snack	Grilled fish cake made of ground fish meat mixed with tapioca starch and spices
Cheng tng		Dessert	A light refreshing soup with longans, barley, agar strips, lotus seeds and a sweet syrup, served either hot or cold. It is analogous to the Cantonese Ching bo leung.
Ice kachang		Dessert	Malaysian dessert which is also common in Singapore.
Cendol		Dessert	The dessert's basic ingredients are coconut milk, jelly noodles made from rice flour with green food coloring (usually derived from the pandan leaf), shaved ice and palm sugar.

== Beverages ==
Name	Image	Type	Description
Bandung (drink)		Drink	It consists of evaporated milk or condensed milk flavoured with rose cordial syrup, giving a pink colour.
Chin chow drink		Drink	Grass jelly made into a sweet beverage.
Kopi		Drink	Nanyang coffee, mixed with condensed milk and sugar.
Milo		Drink	Chocolate and malt powder typically mixed with hot water and condensed milk. Served hot or cold (Milo Peng).
Milo dinosaur		Drink	Composed of a cup of iced Milo (a chocolate malt beverage) with undissolved Milo powder added on top of it.
Teh tarik		Drink	Pulled tea, made from black tea blended with condensed milk.
Singapore Sling		Beverages	The cocktail was invented in Singapore's Raffles Hotel, and is still served at the hotel's Long Bar.
