= Phá lấu =

Vietnamese snack of braised pork offal

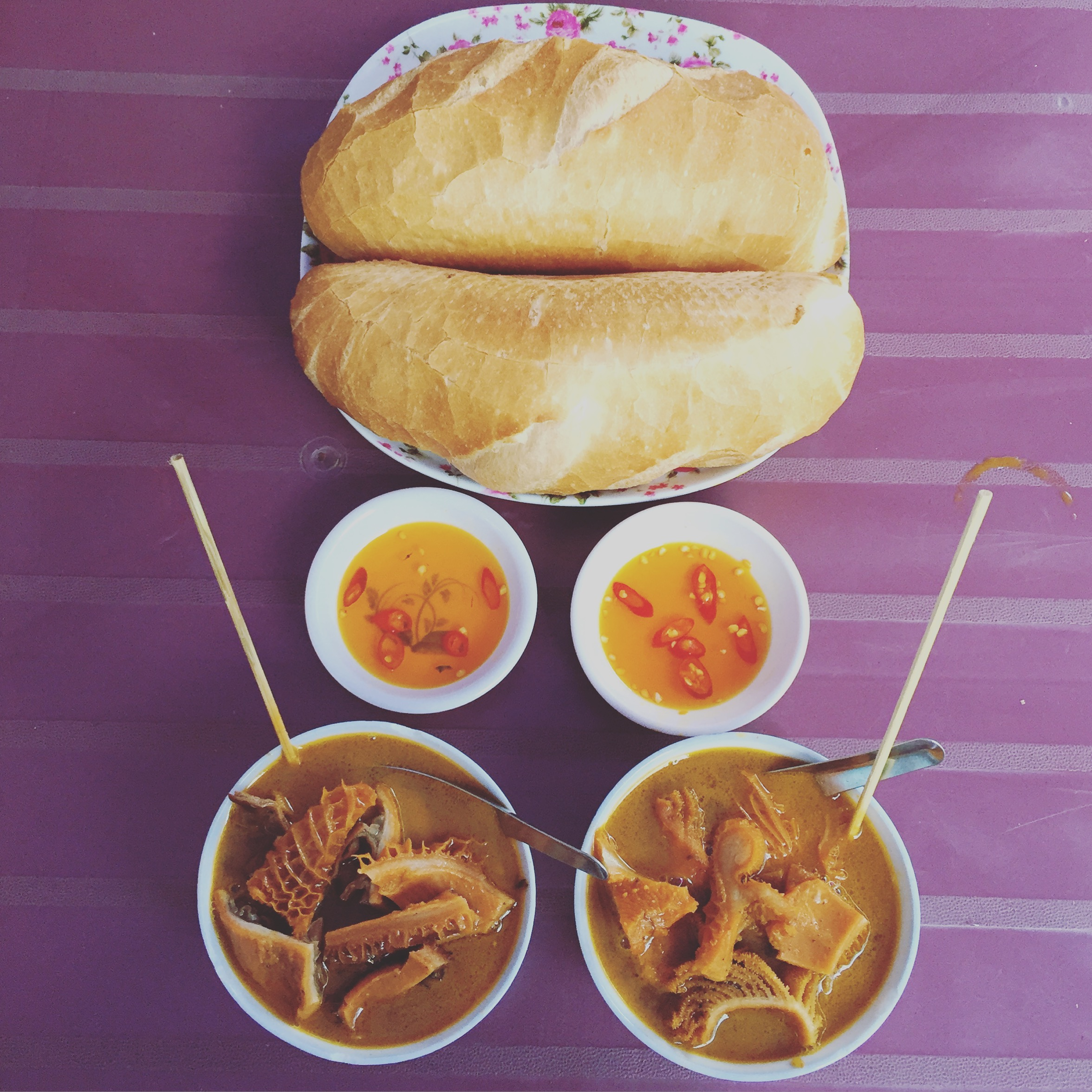
- Phá lấu as served in Vietnam
- Alternative names: Phá lấu bò
- Type: Stew
- Place of origin: Hong Kong; Vietnam; China
- Main ingredients: dark soy sauce; pork offal
- Similar dishes: sekba, kway chap, Burmese pork offal skewers

Phá lấu (Chinese: 拍滷; Pe̍h-ōe-jī: phah-ló̍) is a Vietnamese dish from Ho Chi Minh City, made from pork meat and offal that is braised in a spiced stock of five-spice powder (with curry powder sometimes added). Small wooden sticks are used to pick up the meat, which is then dipped in pepper, lime/kumquat and chili fish sauce and served with rice, noodle or bánh mì.

Phá lấu comes in a variety of styles depending on the region, the influence of the chef, and the availability of local ingredients. A popular variation includes the use of coconut milk in the broth, which imparts a rich and complex flavor to the stew. Part of the complexity arises from the cooking process, which greatly impacts the constitution of the stew. The offal is simmered for hours to make it tender and is then left to soak in the broth, where it imparts flavor while absorbing the essence of the five-spice powder and coconut milk.

== See also ==
- Ngau zap
- Ngiu chap
- Lou mei
- Sekba
