= Oviduct =

Passageway from the ovaries in vertebrates

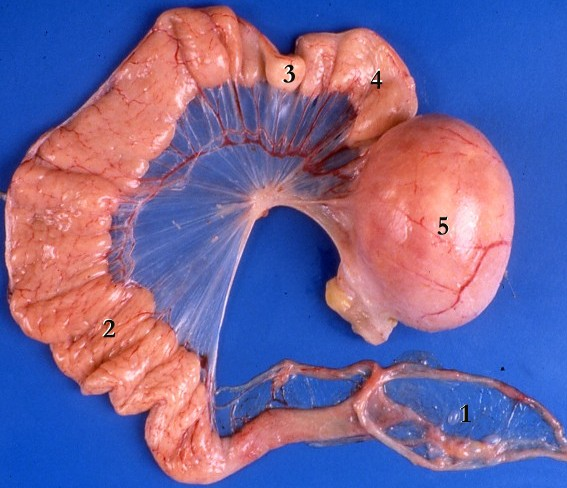
Oviduct of a laying hen

The oviduct in vertebrates is the passageway from an ovary. In human females, this is more usually known as the fallopian tube. The eggs travel along the oviduct. These eggs will either be fertilized by spermatozoa to become a zygote, or will degenerate in the body. Normally, these are paired structures, but in birds and some cartilaginous fishes, one or the other side fails to develop (together with the corresponding ovary), and only one functional oviduct can be found.

Except in teleosts, the oviduct is not directly in contact with the ovary. Instead, the most anterior portion ends in a funnel-shaped structure called the infundibulum, which collects eggs as they are released by the ovary into the body cavity.

The only female vertebrates to lack oviducts are the jawless fishes. In these species, the single fused ovary releases eggs directly into the body cavity. The fish eventually extrudes the eggs through a small genital pore towards the rear of the body.

== Fish and amphibians ==
In amphibians and lungfishes, the oviduct is a simple ciliated tube, lined with mucus-secreting glands that produce the jelly that surrounds the ovum. In all other vertebrates, there is normally some degree of specialisation of the tube, depending on the type of eggs produced.

In cartilaginous fishes, the middle portion of the tube develops as a shell gland. The first portion of this gland secretes the egg white, while the lower portion secretes a hard, horny, capsule to protect the developing egg. Distal to the shell gland is the ovisac, a distended region in which eggs are stored prior to laying. In ovoviviparous species, the egg remains within the ovisac until it hatches. Some cartilaginous fishes, however, are truly viviparous, giving birth to live young, and producing no egg shell. In these forms, the ovisac nurtures the developing embryo, often with the aid of vascular outgrowths similar to, but much simpler than, the mammalian placenta.

The most primitive ray finned fishes retain the simple structure also found in lungfishes. In teleosts, folds of peritoneum enclose the ovary and upper part of the tube, fusing them into a single structure. The ovary itself is hollow, with eggs being shed into the central cavity, and thence passing directly into the oviduct. The enclosed nature of the female reproductive system in these fishes makes it impossible for eggs to escape into the general body cavity; a necessary development, given that thousands or even millions of eggs may be released in a single spawning.

== Amniotes ==
In amniotes – reptiles, birds, and mammals – the egg is enclosed with an outer layer, or amnion, which has led to further development of the oviduct. In reptiles, birds, and monotremes, the main part of the oviduct is a muscular tube, capable of considerable distension to transport the large eggs that are produced. This part of the oviduct is lined with glands that secrete the components of the egg white. The lower portion of the oviduct, or uterus, has a thicker layer of smooth muscle and contains the glands that secrete the egg shell.

In marsupials and placental mammals, the uterus becomes lined by an endometrium, and is more developed than in egg-laying amniotes. In many placental mammals, the uteri of each side become partially or wholly fused into a single organ, although in marsupials they remain completely separate.

For birds, the oviduct is composed of:

1. Infundibulum (formation of chalazae, place of fertilisation)
2. Magnum (formation of egg white)
3. Isthmus (formation of the shell membrane)
4. Shell gland (formation of egg shell)
5. Vaginal homologue (formation of cuticle)

(See matching numbers in the picture)

== As food ==
Animal oviducts are sometimes eaten as offal. Pig fallopian tubes may be served fried or in congee or kway chap. Hasma is made from the fat near the fallopian tubes of the Asiatic grass frog.
