= Burmese pork offal skewers =

Burmese street food

Pork offal skewers
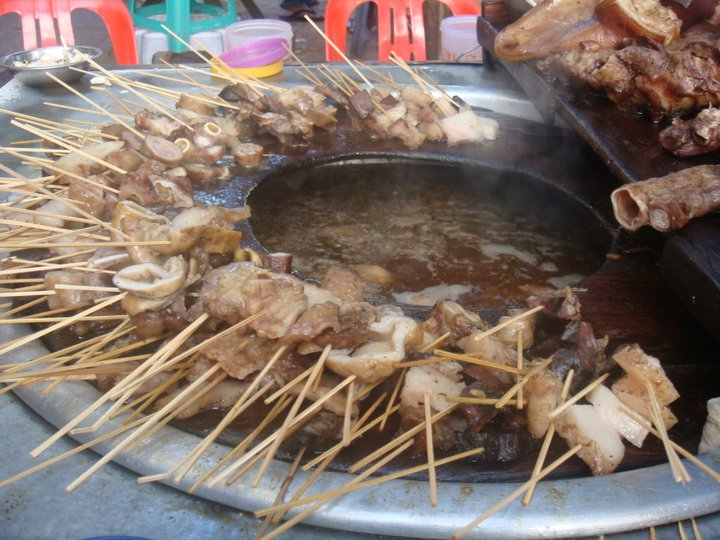
- Alternative names: Wet tha dok htoe
- Place of origin: Myanmar
- Created by: Sino-Burmese people
- Main ingredients: Pork offal; soy sauce
- Similar dishes: Kway chap, Sekba, Phá lấu, Lou mei

Burmese pork offal skewers, also known as wet tha dok hto (Burmese: ဝက်သားတုတ်ထိုး, pronounced [wɛʔθádoʊʔtʰó]; lit. 'pork on a skewer'; also romanized wet thar doke htoe) are pork offal skewers simmered in light soy sauce, and popularly served as a street food in Burmese cuisine. The skewers are dipped in a garlic and chili sauce. The street food resembles the Indonesian sekba and the braised meats in the Malaysian and Singaporean dish kway chap.

The cuts of pork meat used in the skewers include the internal organs of the pig, including its ears, skin and cartilage, tongue, and offal, including the liver, heart, intestines, kidneys, spleen, lungs. The meat is well cooked in a large pan on a charcoal stove before simmering. The broth is made of light soy sauce, sugarcane, five-spice powder and bayleaf, ginger, oyster sauce, and an assortment of herbs, including lemongrass, mint, coriander, basil.

This street food first emerged in Yangon Chinatown, and is now ubiquitous in the city. The earliest documented reference to Burmese pork skewers is a 1941 cartoon illustrated by Ba Gyan. Skewers are sold by the stick, and traditionally, street vendors set up stalls around which patrons gather and sit to enjoy.

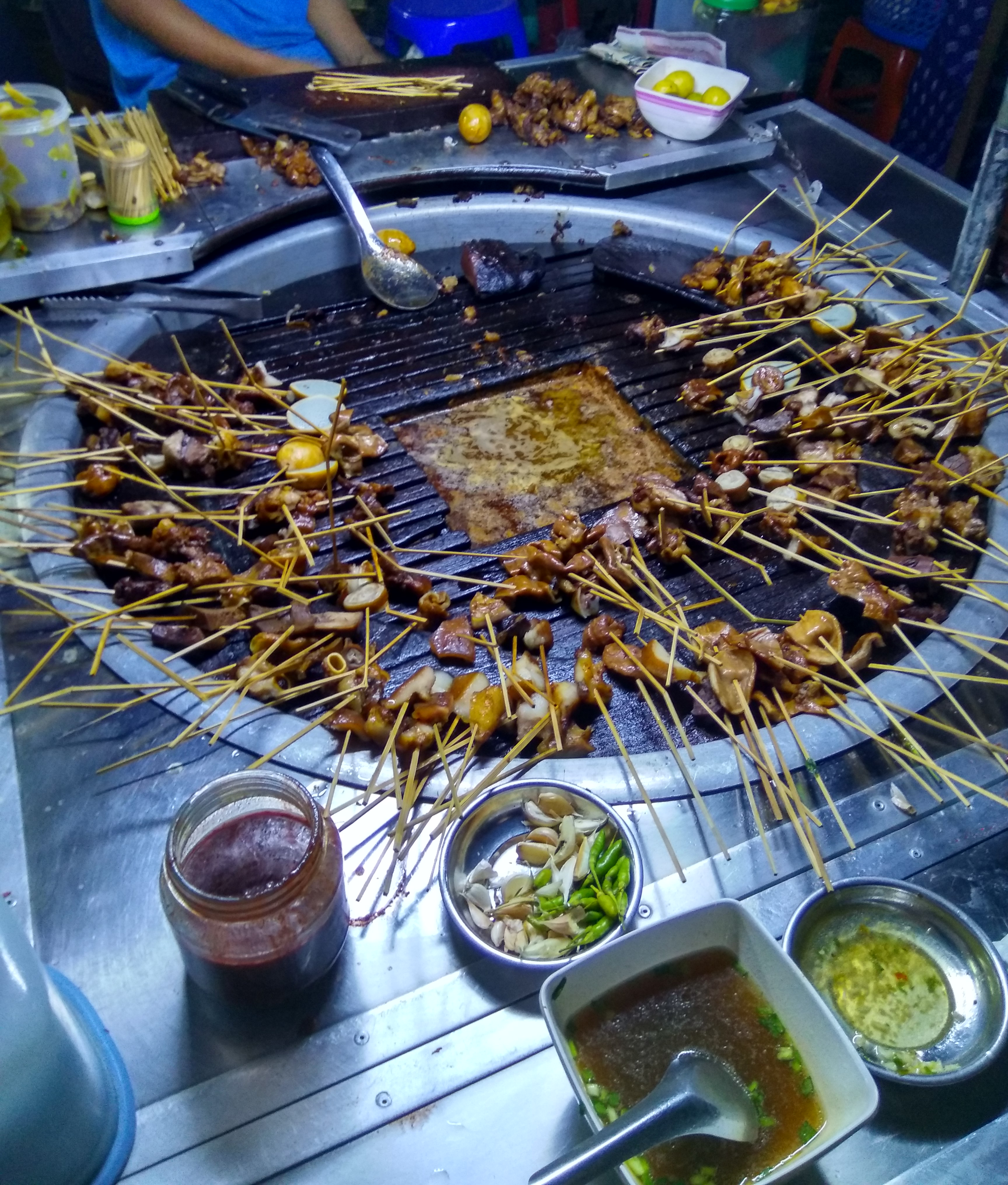
Pork stick, a populat street food in Myanmar
