= Ngau zap =

Cantonese beef dish

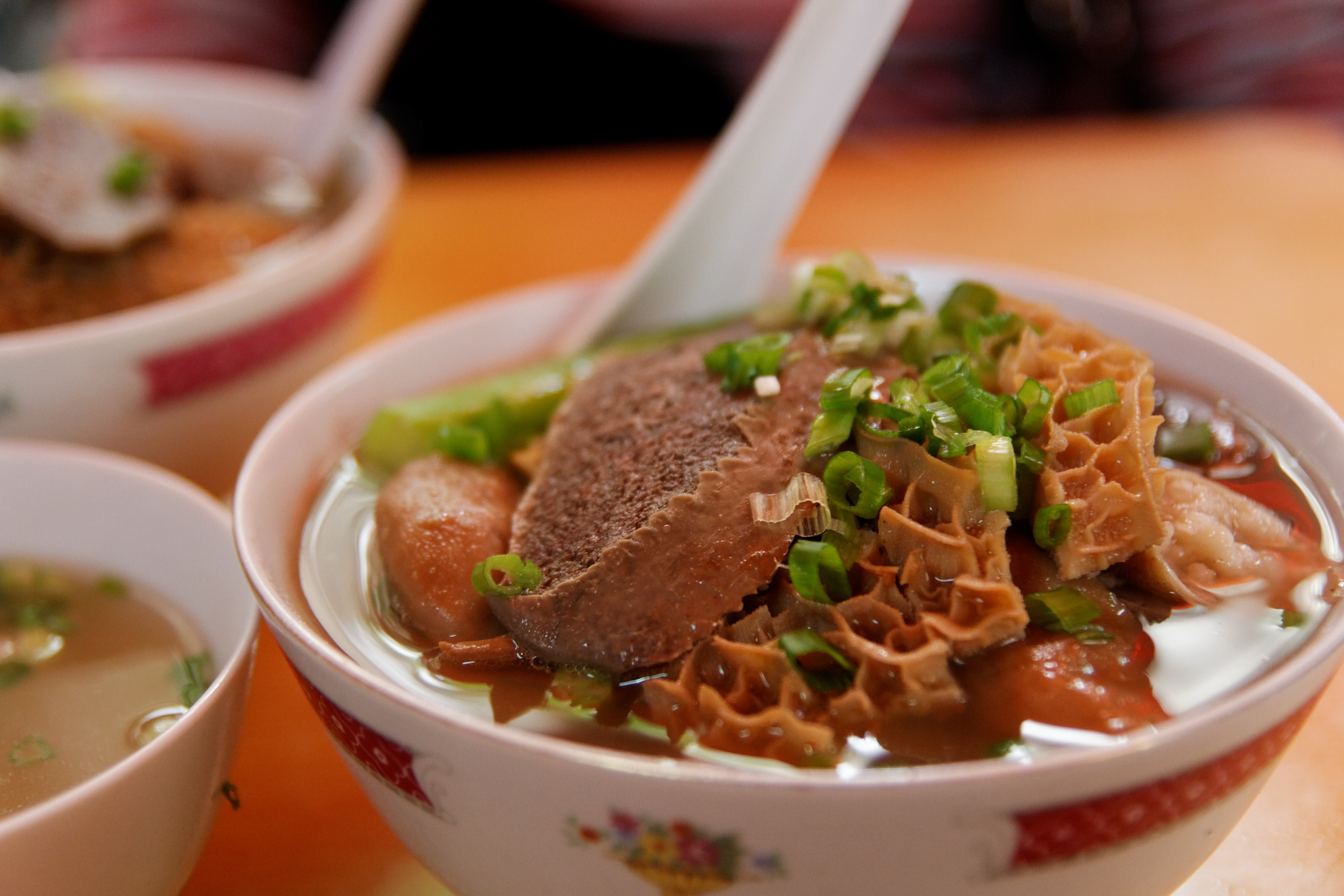
Beef tripe rice noodle (ho fen) in Ying Kee Noodle Shop, Hong Kong

Ngau zap or ngau chap (simplified Chinese: 牛杂; traditional Chinese: 牛雜) is a Cantonese dish made of beef entrails.

Good quality beef is chosen to stew with its entrails for a couple of hours. There are several ways to serve this food, for instance, as beef entrails hot pot, beef entrails on a skewer and beef entrails served with pieces etc. The seasonings called "13 herbs" are the main composition of the master stock sauce. None of the herbs can be omitted, or else it causes a huge change of flavour. The herbs are fennel, Sichuan peppercorn, star anise, dried citrus peel, cinnamon, sand ginger, and nutmeg. The tripe (four tripes of the cow are edible but the honeycomb tripe has the highest rating), pancreas, intestine, spleen and lungs are the major characters of the beef entrails. The dish is usually served with chili oil and black pepper.

== Origin ==
According to a Chinese legend, an emperor traveling in disguise found out that his citizens were suffering from hunger. Thus, he commanded butchers to kill the cows and cooked them for the starved citizens. The king hoped every citizen could eat it. So besides of cooking the beef, entrails of cows were also put into the pot to cook more. Citizens thought the dish tasted good and the dish has passed on from generation to generation.

== In Hong Kong ==
Ngau zap had been a popular snack in Guangdong province of China. Due to the Chinese Civil War of the mid-20th century, a wave of migrants from mainland China flooded into Hong Kong as refugees. The influence of the migrants from Guangzhou made Ngau zap popular in Hong Kong. With the economic boost of Hong Kong in the 1970s, the fusion of Chinese and Western cultures led to the popularity of Ngau zap among foreign visitors. It is common to buy Ngau zap from street vendors, which is another unique feature that can be found in Hong Kong. Under the law, if the street vendors fail to get licenses given out by the Food and Environmental Hygiene Department, they cannot continue their business as they may cause hygienic problems, and hawkers may worsen the city image of Hong Kong. In 1958, the government set up Hawkers Control Teams to combat street vendors. However, starting from the 1970s, the government has slowly stopped giving out licenses to street vendors. It resulted in the disappearance of many street vendors, thus the places selling Ngau zap.

The standardisation of operations and the maturity of the market helped further the development of Ngau zap in Hong Kong. Beef entrails has become one of the must-eats in cart noodle shops and cha chaan tengs. Some people have stopped vending on the streets and opened beef entrails restaurants.

== Nutrition facts of beef entrails ==
=== Beef tripe ===
A cow has four stomachs and beef tripe comes from three of the four. One ounce of beef tripe contains 24 calories. It also contains 1.05 gram of fat and 3.42 gram of protein. A four-ounce serving includes 8 percent of the recommended daily allowance, zinc, and vitamin B12. However, cholesterol is a concern. It is a high cholesterol food and people with high cholesterol levels should consult with their doctors.

=== Beef liver ===
A 3-ounce serving of braised beef liver has 162 calories and 24.7 grams of complete protein. Besides, beef liver is rich in vitamins and minerals. It has a rich source of vitamin A to keep eyes, skin and immune system healthy. A 3-ounce serving supplies more than half of the recommended daily allowance of folate and vitamins B-6 and B-12. Folate is especially important for women because it prevents birth defects formed in the first trimester of pregnancy. Vitamin B-6 helps produce serotonin to regulate moods and sleep cycle, and vitamin B-12 is essential for nerves and red blood cells. Also, beef liver is well known as a source of iron. A 3-ounce serving supplies 31 percent of women's and 70 percent of men's recommended daily allowance. Iron is used in producing red blood cells and thus intake more can prevent anemia. Unfortunately, beef liver is very high in cholesterol. In fact, the American Heart Association suggests people to limit their intake of cholesterol to 300 milligrams or less per day, while a simple 3-ounce serving of liver brings in a whopping 330 milligrams of cholesterol. This can lead to long-term heart disease that can result in permanent damage or even death.

== Cuisines cooked with beef entrails ==
Good quality of entrails is needed to cook a better taste. They should look glistening and wet and stand firm and proud. For the first step of cooking the fresh beef entrails, cut them into small pieces and trim away the excess fat, especially for the sirloin, and underneath the tongue. For the frozen one, defrost them before cutting and trimming. These are the basic step of cooking beef entrails. There are different ways of cooking will be mentioned below.

=== Ngau zap with radish ===
Bring a large pan of water to the boil and add the diced meat and radish. Blanch them for few minutes until they are brown in surface, but still pink in the middle. Drain the water out and add fresh water into the boil again. Marinate them with water, chu hou paste and ginger for around 1.5 hours. Wash, peel off and cut the radish. Add the diced radish together with the beef entrails and marinate for another half-hour.

=== Ngau zap with master stock sauce ===
Use a muslin bag to pack star anise, dried citrus peel, cinnamon, licorice and clove together. Heat the pot and oil with strong fire and stir-fry the garlic, crushed ginger and scallion with fermented bean sauce. Add water and Baijiu into the pot together with the beef entrails and muslin bag. Boil and marinate them for 2 hours.

=== Ngau zap hot pot ===
Blanch the beef entrails with boiled water. Wash and cut the onions, green peppers and carrot. Pull the broth into the pot with the entrails, sliced onions, green peppers, carrot and seasoning including salt, soy sauce, sugar and white pepper powder. People can freely add the food ingredients they want like fish balls, vegetables, etc. People can eat the beef entrails and other food when they are stewed.

== See also ==
- Ngiu chap
- Phá lấu
