= Sekba =

Indonesian braised pork dish

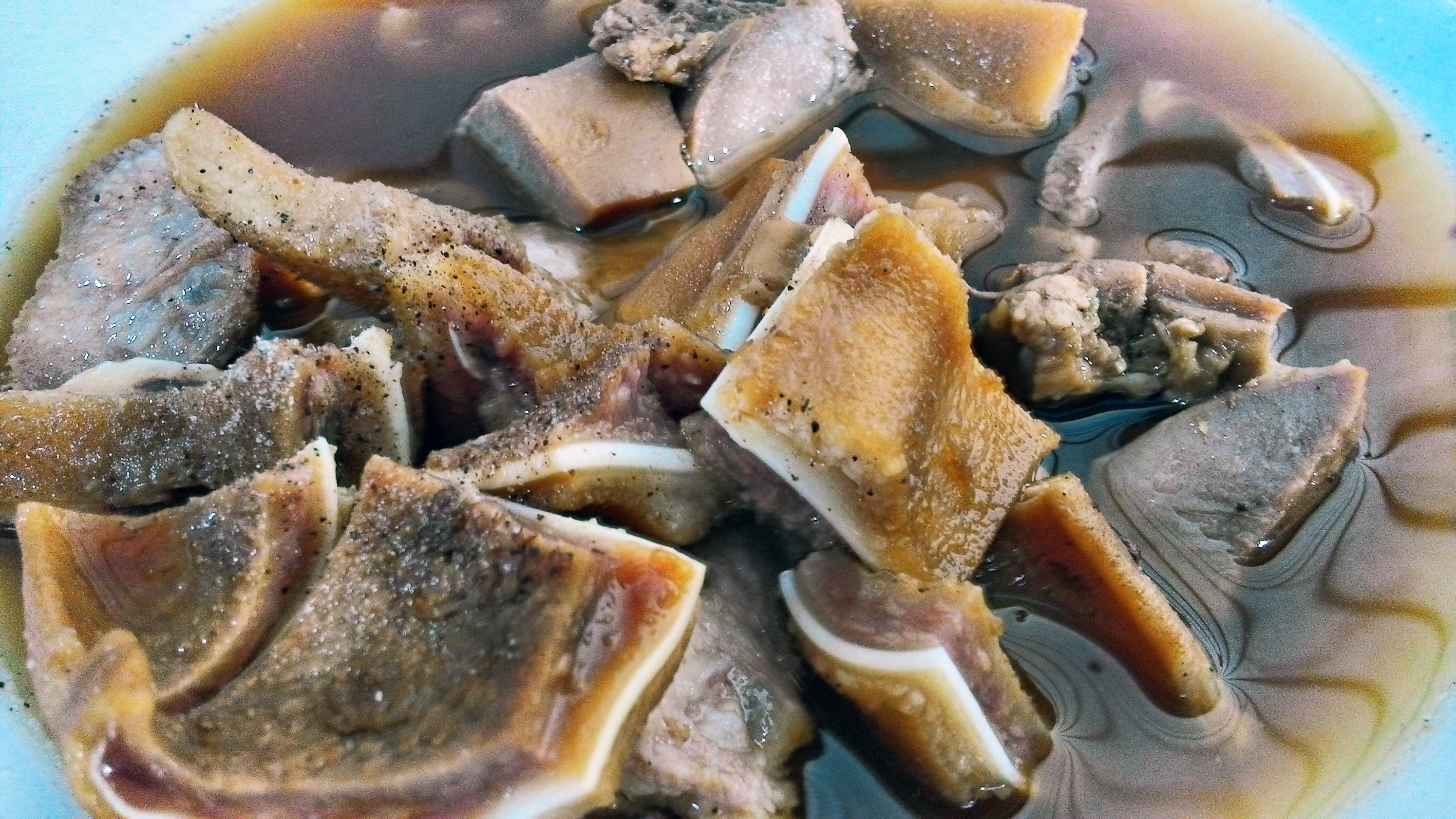
- Sekba consists mainly of pig offal (chiefly its ears and tongue), and meat.
- Alternative names: Bektim
- Course: Main course
- Place of origin: Indonesia
- Region or state: Chinatowns in Indonesia, especially Jakarta
- Created by: Chinese Indonesians
- Serving temperature: Hot
- Main ingredients: Pork offal (liver, tongue, ear, intestine, cartilage) and meat braised in soy sauce, garlic and Chinese herbs
- Similar dishes: Kway chap, Burmese pork offal skewers

Sekba or sometimes called bektim is a Chinese Indonesian pork offal stewed in a mild soy sauce-based soup. The stew tastes mildly sweet and salty, made from soy sauce, garlic, and Chinese herbs. It is a popular fare street food in Indonesian Chinatowns, such as Gloria alley, Glodok Chinatown in Jakarta, Indonesia.

== Variations ==
As a street food fare, customer might choose the type of pork offals in their dish, and they will be charged accordingly. Other than pork meat, the types of pork offals being offered as sekba are pig's ears, tongue, liver, tripe, intestines and lungs. The prices of each pieces of pork offals ranged between Rp 5,000 to Rp 15,000. A personal portion usually contains three types of offals or meat. Vegetables, such as boiled potatoes, salted vegetables, tofu, and sometimes hard boiled eggs may also be added.

== See also ==
- Babi kecap
- Bak kut teh
- Lou mei
- Phá lấu
- Pig's organ soup
- Semur
- List of stews
