= Perpetual stew =

Pottage which is rarely or never emptied

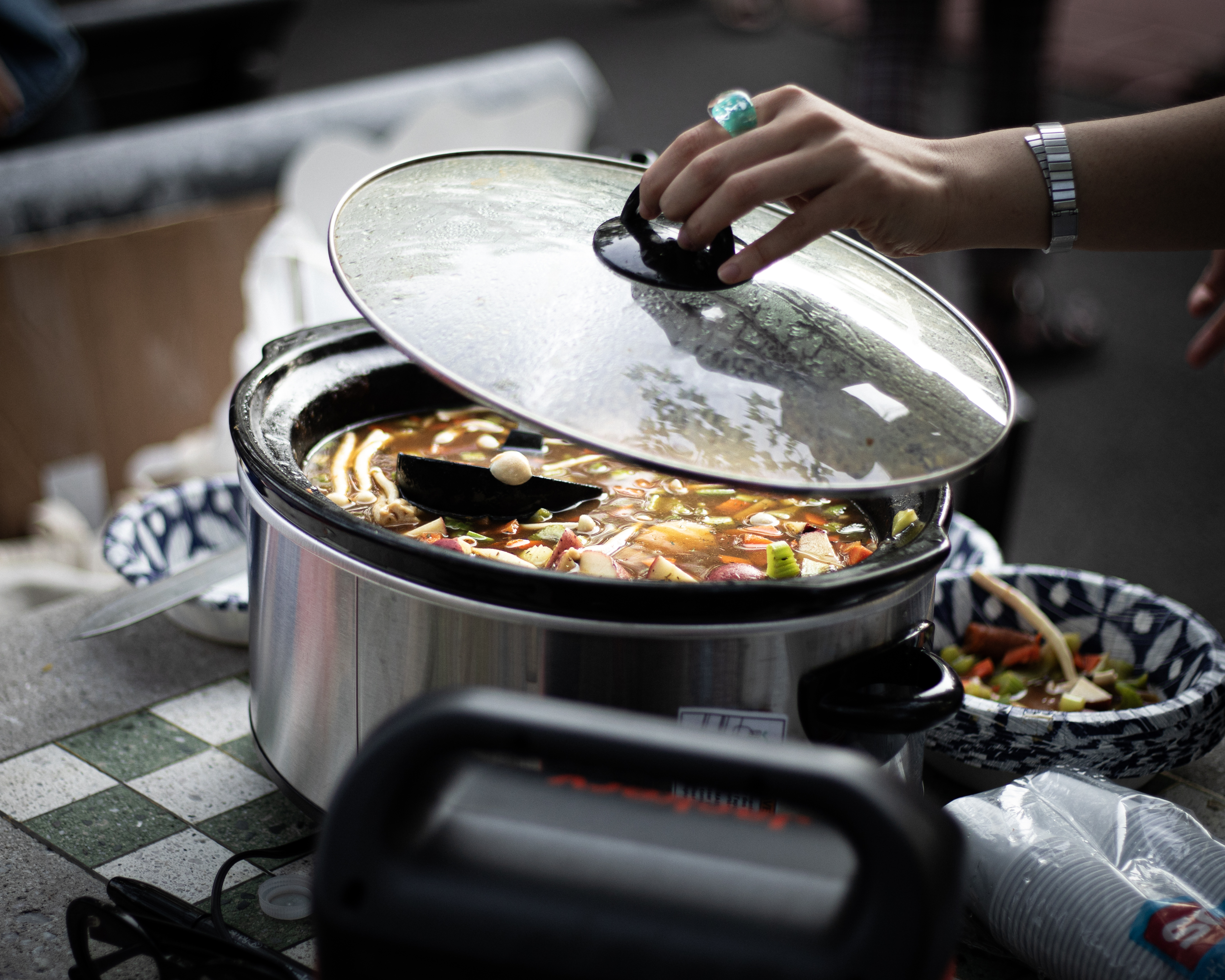
- Perpetual stew in a slow cooker
- Alternative names: Hunter's pot, hunter's stew
- Type: Stew

A perpetual stew, also known as forever soup, hunter's pot or hunter's stew, is a pot into which foodstuffs are placed and cooked, continuously. The pot is never or rarely emptied, and ingredients and liquid are replenished as necessary. Such foods can continue cooking for decades or longer if properly maintained. The concept is often a common element in descriptions of medieval inns. Foods prepared in a perpetual stew have been described as being flavourful due to the manner in which the ingredients blend together. Various ingredients can be used in a perpetual stew such as root vegetables, tubers (potatoes, yams, etc.) and various meats.

== Historical examples ==
Perpetual stews are speculated to have been common in medieval cuisine, often as pottage or pot-au-feu:

Bread, water or ale, and a companaticum ('that which goes with the bread') from the cauldron, the original stockpot or pot-au-feu that provided an ever-changing broth enriched daily with whatever was available. The cauldron was rarely emptied out except in preparation for the meatless weeks of Lent, so that while a hare, hen or pigeon would give it a fine, meaty flavour, the taste of salted pork or cabbage would linger for days, even weeks.

— Reay Tannahill

A batch of pot-au-feu was claimed by one writer to be maintained as a perpetual stew in Perpignan from the 15th century until World War II, when the restaurant ran out of ingredients to keep the stew going due to the German occupation.

Some medieval historians have, however, cast doubt on the historicity of the idea. Historian Jenni Lares from the University of Tampere notes that no medieval sources support its existence and argues that it was not a particularly probable dish. Although leftovers were used, surplus food was likely prepared regularly only during festive seasons. For the stew to remain edible, the pot would have had to be boiled constantly, which was not feasible in the Middle Ages. Fires in residential buildings were typically lit only during the day, and they were banned at night in cities due to the risk of fire spreading. Collecting firewood was also time- and labor-intensive, making it unlikely that so much would have been used on a single stew. Furthermore, Catholic doctrine forbade the eating of meat on one or more days weekly, as well as during Lent. On Good Friday, cooking or even lighting a fire was forbidden.

== Modern examples ==
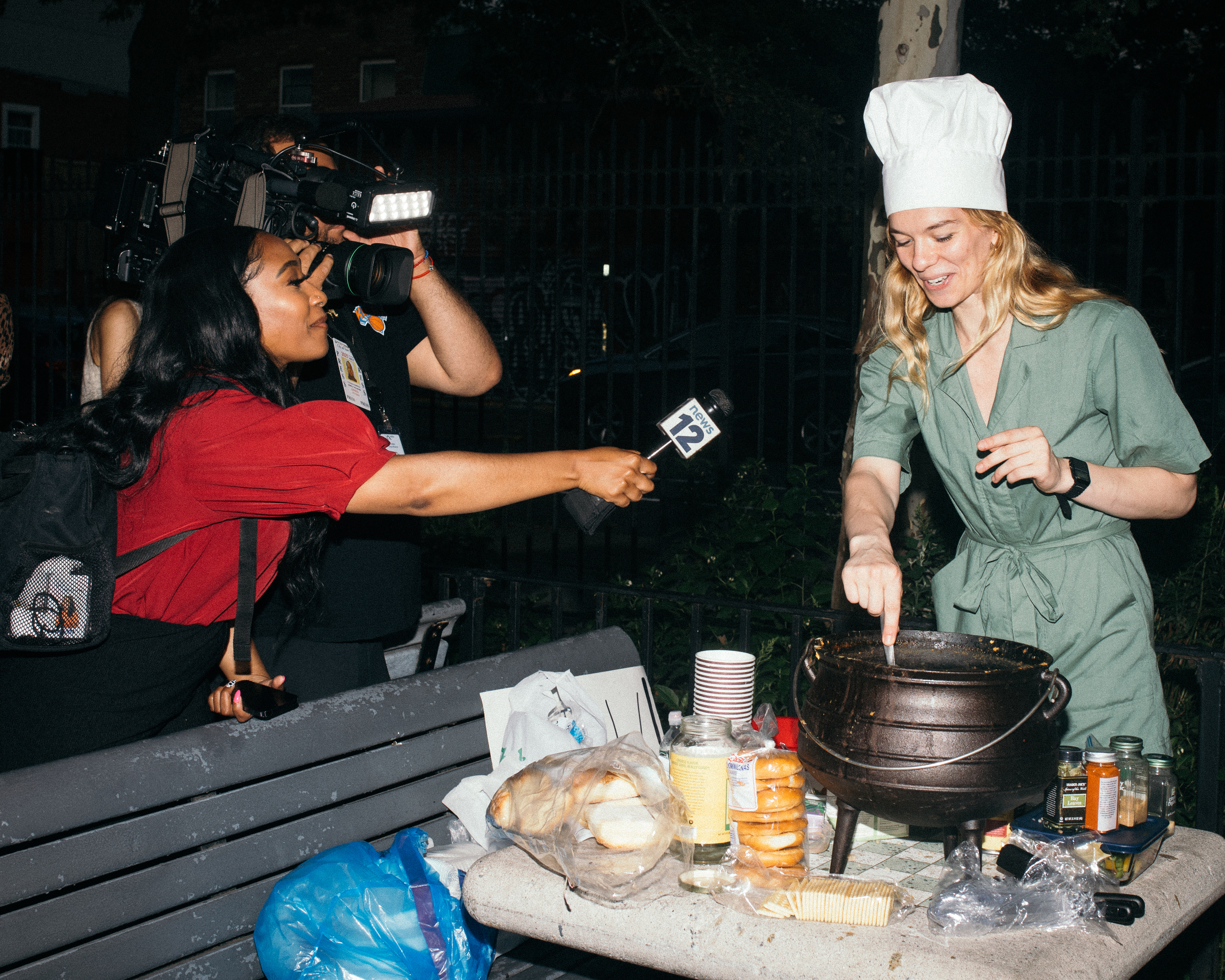
Annie Rauwerda making and discussing her perpetual stew in 2023 with News 12 in New York City

The tradition of perpetual stew remains prevalent in South and East Asian countries. Notable examples include goat and beef noodle soup served by the third generation restaurant Wattana Panich in Bangkok, Thailand, which has been cooking since 1974, and oden broth from Otafuku in Asakusa, Japan, which has served the same broth daily since 1945.

Between August 2014 and April 2015 a restaurant in New York City, United States, served a master stock in the style of a perpetual stew for over eight months.

In July 2023 a "Perpetual Stew Club" organised by the social media personality Annie Rauwerda held weekly gatherings in New York City to consume perpetual stew. Hundreds attended the event and brought their own ingredients to contribute to the stew. The stew lasted for 60 days.

Many others have shared their attempts of maintaining a perpetual stew on social media. Zachary Leavitt, posting as ZAQ_Makes online, has been documenting his ongoing crock-pot stew, which he refers to as "Stewtheus", on TikTok and YouTube since 7 June 2025.

== Health concerns ==
Harmful toxins produced by foodborne bacteria pose a risk of food poisoning. It is recommended to sterilise the stew regularly by boiling or freezing it.

== See also ==
- List of stews
- Master stock
- Hotpot
