= Ngiu chap =

Beef mixed noodle soup dish from Sabah, Malaysia

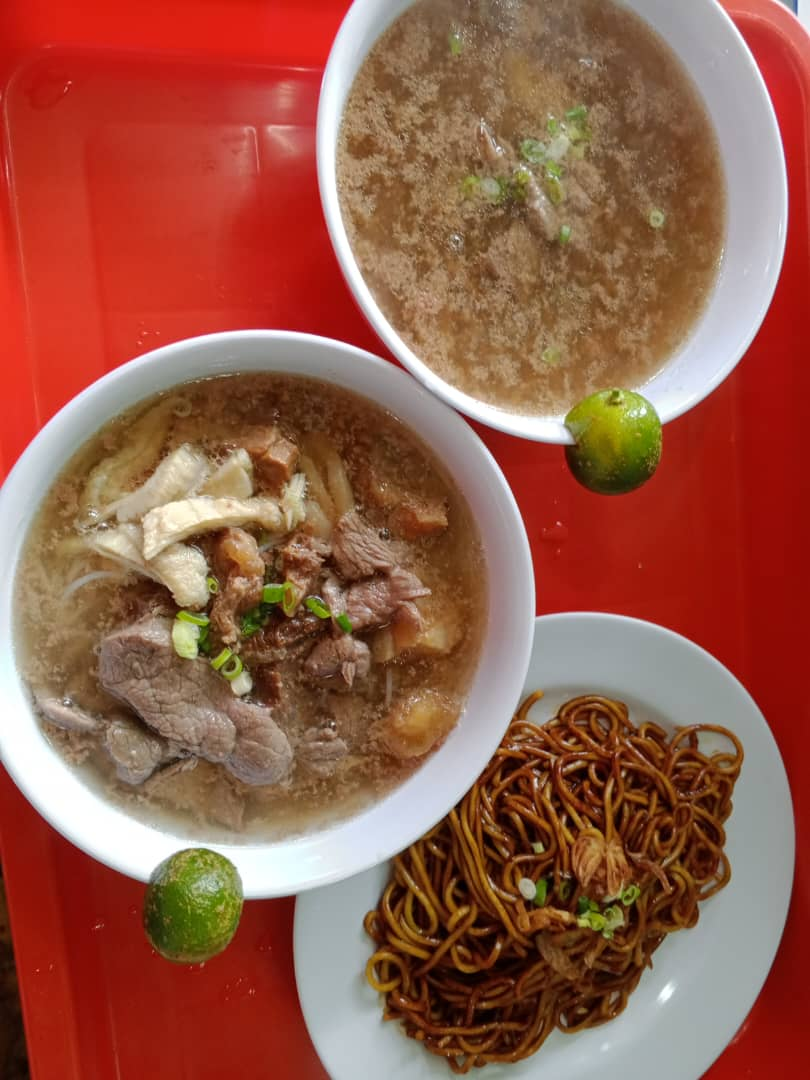
- Ngiu chap (left) with soup and noodle at the Ranau Hakka Food Court in Sabah, Malaysia
- Alternative names: ngau chap
- Type: Mixed beef noodle soup dish
- Course: Main course
- Place of origin: Kota Kinabalu, Malaysia
- Region or state: Kota Kinabalu and Penampang in Sabah
- Associated cuisine: Sabahan cuisine
- Main ingredients: Beef and cow/buffalo parts, meatballs, rice vermicelli
- Ingredients generally used: Cinnamon, cloves, star anise, white peppercorns, lime

Ngiu chap, or ngau chap (lit. 'Beef mix') (Malay: Sup Daging Kerbau Campur; Chinese: 牛什; pinyin: Niú shén), is a Sabahan dish consisting of mixed beef soup with rice vermicelli from the northwestern part of the city of Kota Kinabalu and Penampang town in Sabah, Malaysia.

== Origin and background ==
The ngiu chap beef noodle dish in Sabah originates from the Chinese migrants, specifically those from Hainan, who spread the dish within the majority Hakka Chinese settlement in Jesselton during the British North Borneo period around the 1930s.

== Preparation ==
The dish is made by simmering the beef cutlets and daikon radish for several hours with herbs and spices. The noodles may consist of either yellow noodles, rice vermicelli, or flat kway teow, served in soup or separately in kon lau style. The beef broth primarily comprises parts of the cow or buffalo, including the omasum, tripe, tongue, heart, intestine, spleen, and liver, with different restaurants having their own recipes.

== See also ==
- List of noodle dishes
- Ngau zap, a similar Cantonese dish made of beef entrails
