= Kway chap =

Chinese noodle soup with pork offal

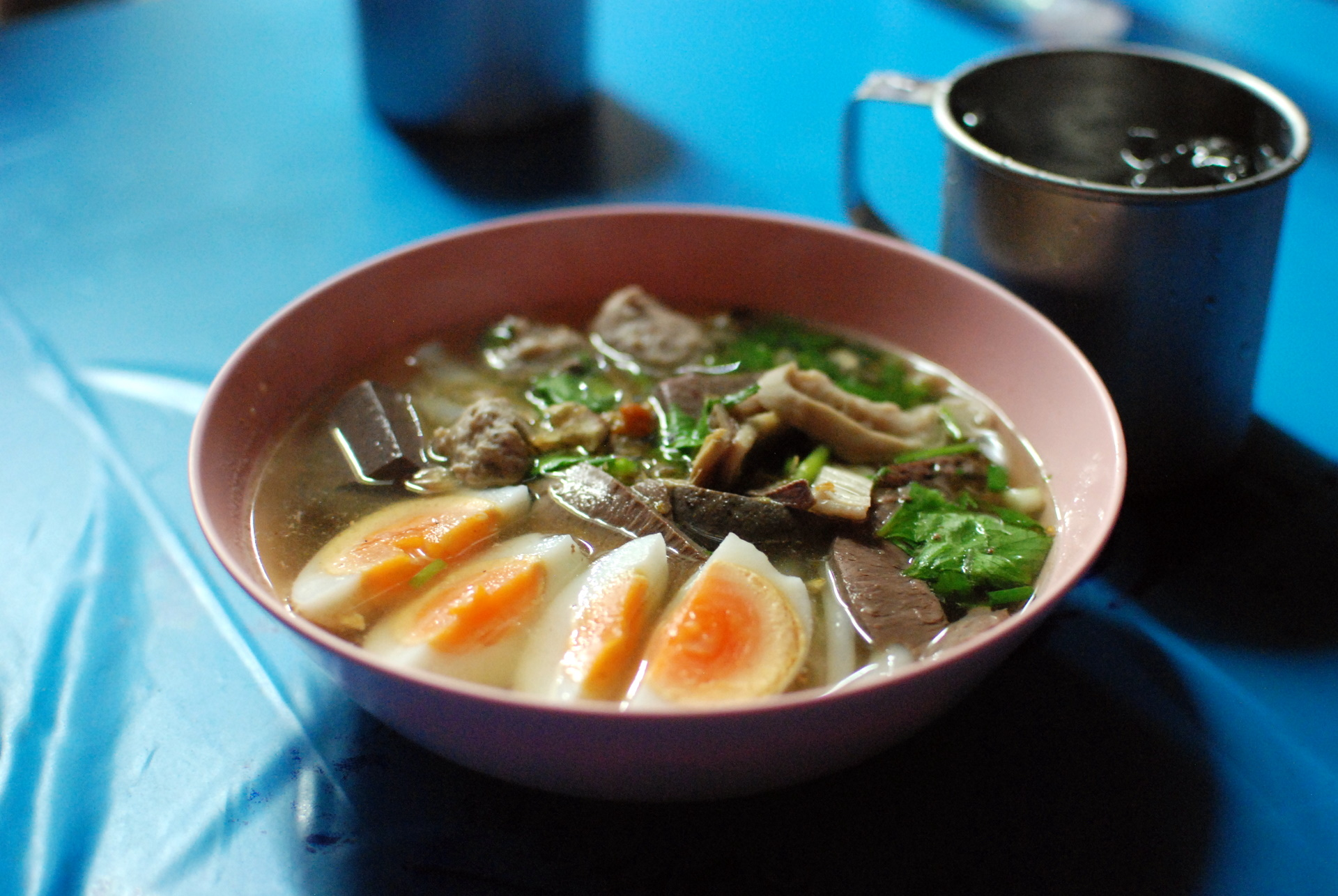
- Alternative names: Kuay jap, kueh jap
- Place of origin: Southern China
- Main ingredients: rice sheets; dark soy sauce; pork offal; braised meats; hard-boiled egg
- Similar dishes: Sekba, Burmese pork offal skewers

Kway chap (Chinese: 粿汁; pinyin: guǒzhī; Pe̍h-ōe-jī: kóe-chiap), also spelt kuay jap or kway jap, is a Teochew noodle soup originating in Chinese cuisine. It consists of flat, broad rice sheets (kway) in a broth, served with an assortment of pork cuts including pork belly; various types of offal; braised duck meat; various kinds of beancurd; preserved salted vegetables; and braised hard-boiled eggs.

Outside of Southern China, the dish is popular particularly in Singapore where there is a significant Teochew diaspora community. Until the 1960s it was often sold at roadside stalls, when changes to public health regulations meant sellers relocated to cafes and hawker centres. Similar variants of the dish could also possibly be found in other parts of Southeast Asia such as Indonesia, Malaysia and Thailand. In Singapore, the meat and other ingredients are served separately from the noodles, while in other regional versions, they are served together in one bowl.

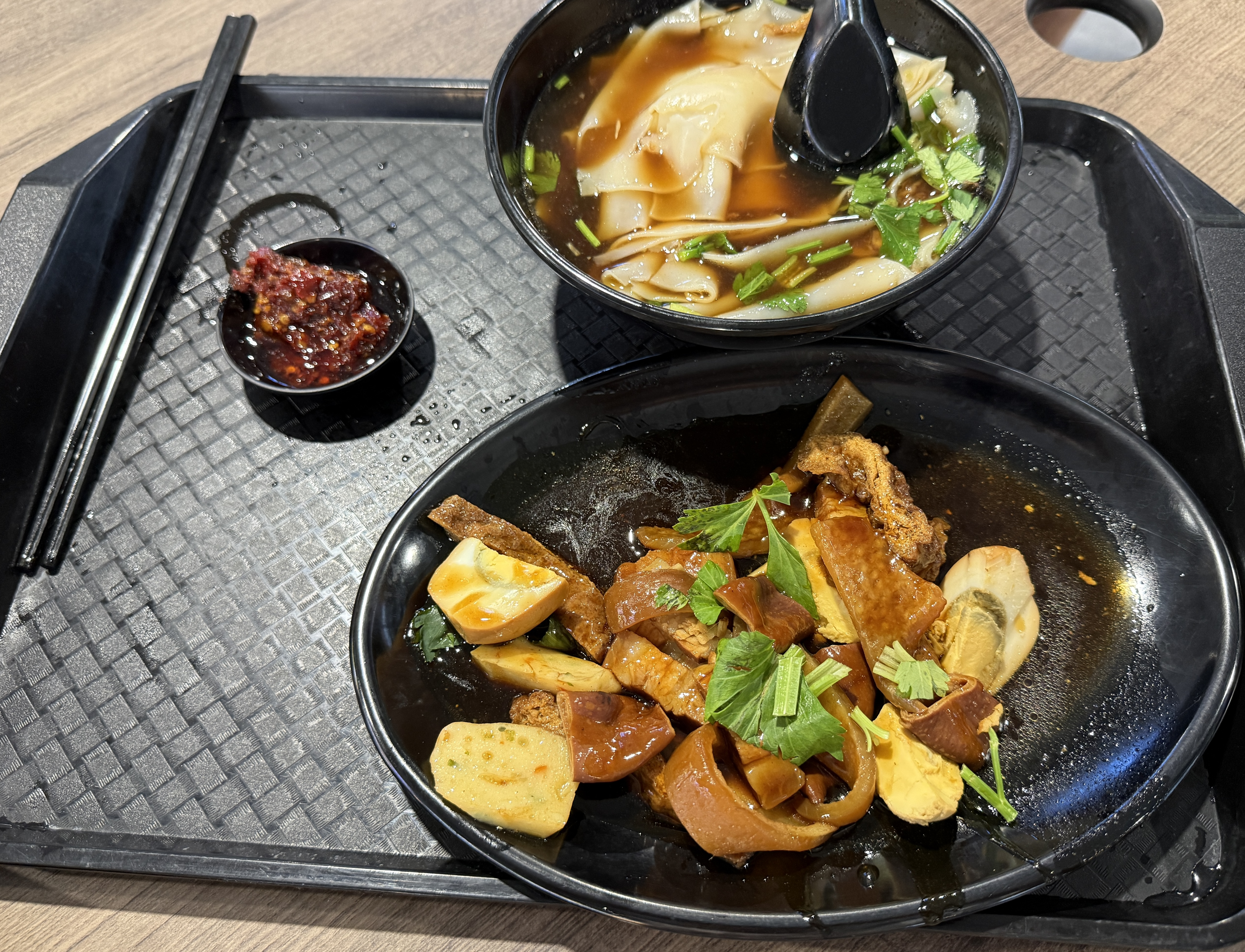
Kway chap in Singapore, with separate noodles and ingredients, and chilli sauce

A variety of pork offal may be available, such as large and small intestines, ears, tongue, stomach or fallopian tubes. In Singapore, pork blood was a common ingredient until it was banned in 1999 due to the 1998–1999 Malaysia Nipah virus outbreak. In 2026, the Singapore Food Agency approved the import of heat-treated pork blood for the first time in 27 years, and some kway chap stalls reintroduced the ingredient.

The type of broth varies with location. In southern China the broth appears white due to the inclusion of rice milk. In Singapore, the use of soy sauce gives it a darker appearance, while in Thailand the broth is clear, and flavored with local spices. Modern variations in Singapore add fishcakes and Japanese-style soft-boiled eggs.

== See also ==
- Noodle soup
