= Pig's organ soup =

Malaysian and Singaporean soup

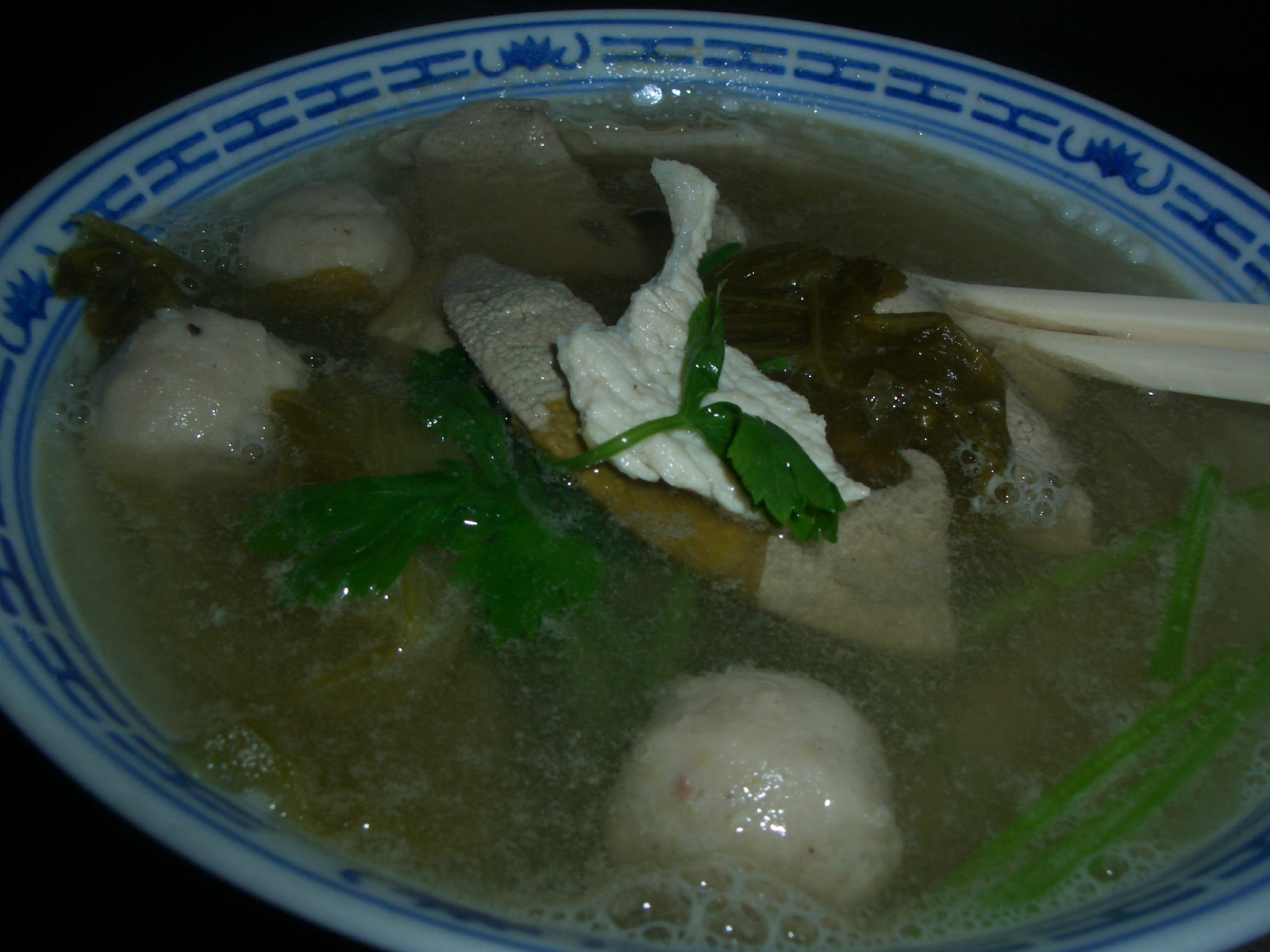
- Type: Soup
- Place of origin: Malaysia, Singapore
- Main ingredients: Pig offal (liver, heart, intestines, kidney, stomach, tongue, lungs, blood cubes, pork meat), vegetables, pork bones, meatballs, minced garlic, Chinese lettuce, Chinese parsley onion leaves, white pepper

Pig's organ soup (simplified Chinese: 猪杂汤; traditional Chinese: 豬雜湯; pinyin: zhū zá tāng; Pe̍h-ōe-jī: ti-cha̍p-thng, tu-cha̍p-thng) or chheng-thng (清湯), is a Malaysian and Singaporean soup that is made from pork offal. The dish is a clear soup, served with other optional side dishes as well as rice.

It is mainly popular in Malaysia and Singapore. An Indonesian variation of the dish, called "song sui", originated from Bangka Island and is popular among Chinese Indonesians in the island.

== Content and variations ==
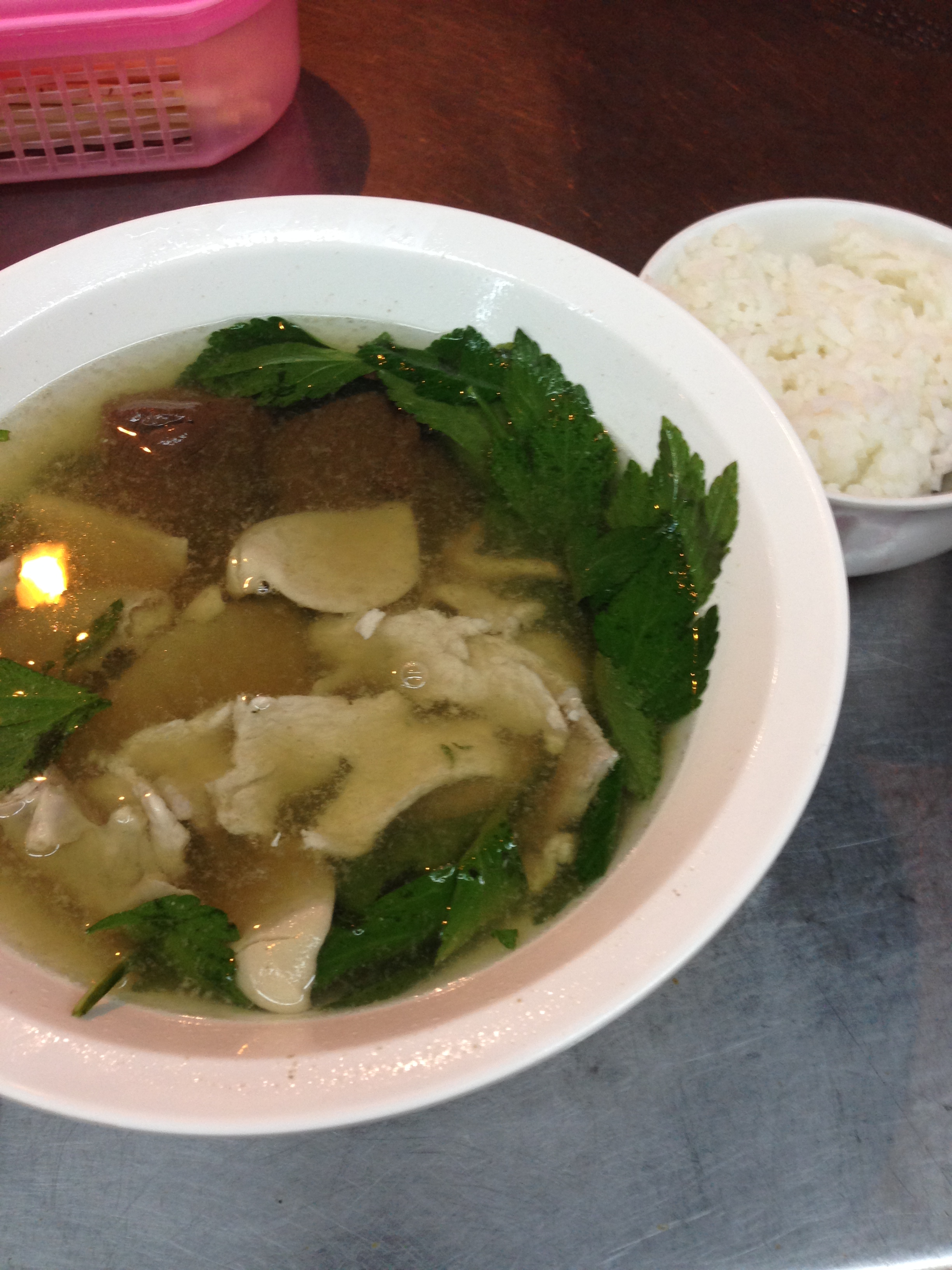
Pork intestine with blood cake soup

The broth is boiled from a mix of offal including liver, heart, intestines, kidney, stomach, tongue, lungs, pig blood curd, as well as pork meat slices, strips of salted vegetables, meatballs, minced garlic, pork bones, celtuce, Chinese parsley and a sprinkle of chopped onion leaves and white pepper.

Side dishes include braised tofu puffs, and eggs and salted vegetables are sometimes served. The meal is usually served with a special chili sauce or soy sauce with chopped hot chili.

== See also ==
- Sekba
- Pork blood soup
- List of Chinese soups
- List of soups
