= Curry chicken noodles =

Singaporean noodle dish

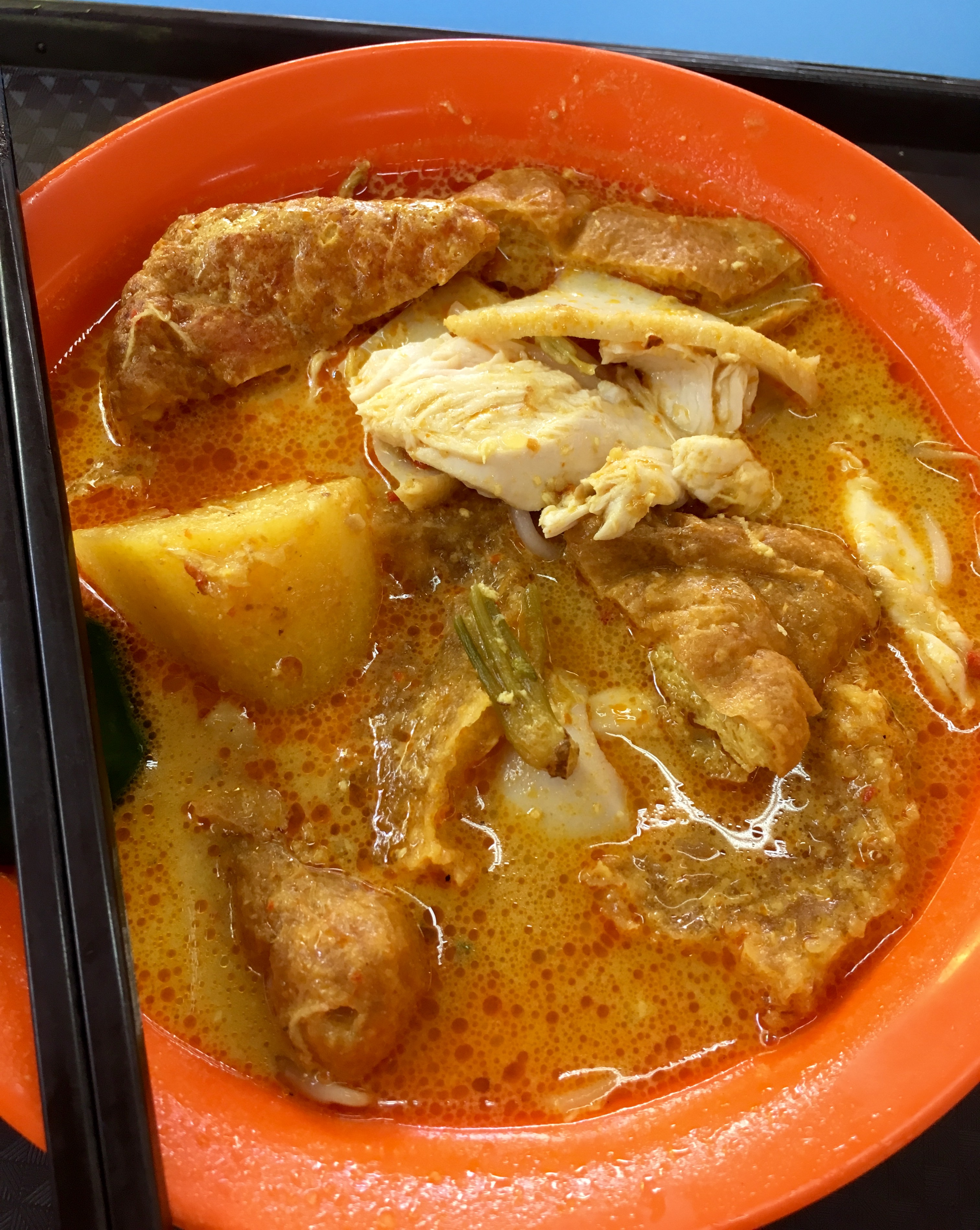
- A plate of self-made curry chicken noodle
- Type: Curry
- Place of origin: Singapore
- Main ingredients: Chicken, tau pok, yellow noodles
- Other information

Chinese name
- Chinese: 咖喱鸡面
Transcriptions
Standard Mandarin
- Hanyu Pinyin: gā lí ji miàn

Curry chicken noodle is a Singaporean dish. It uses curry as soup base coupled with yellow noodles. Some stores will use rice noodles instead.

The dish usually contains chicken meat and tau pok. Additional ingredients may include potatoes or other dishes, depending on stores. Curry plays an important part in this dish. Usually a more watery curry base is preferred so that the noodles are not hard to swallow.
