= Lou mei =

Cantonese dish

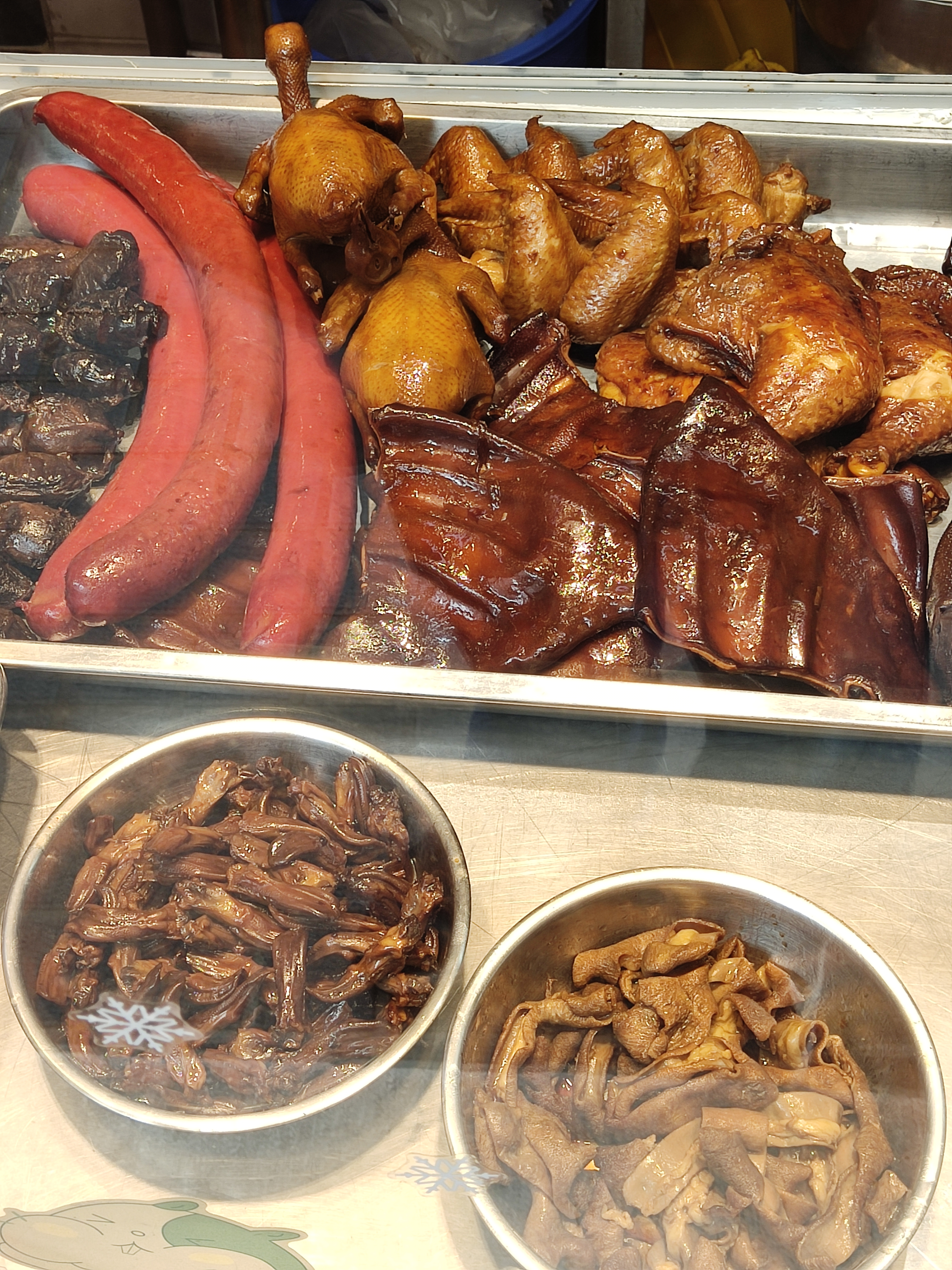
- Lou mei consisting of braised meats
- Course: Hors d'oeuvre
- Place of origin: China
- Main ingredients: Offal

Lou mei
- Traditional Chinese: 滷味
- Simplified Chinese: 卤味
- Jyutping: lou5 mei2
- Hanyu Pinyin: lǔwèi
Transcriptions
Standard Mandarin
- Hanyu Pinyin: lǔwèi
- IPA: [lù wêɪ]
Yue: Cantonese
- Yale Romanization: lóuh méi
- Jyutping: lou5 mei2
- IPA: [lɔw˩˧ mej˧˥]
Southern Min
- Hokkien POJ: ló͘-bi

Lou mei is the Cantonese name given to dishes made by braising in a sauce known as a master stock or lou sauce (滷水; lou5 seoi2; lóuh séui or 滷汁; lou5 zap1; lóuh jāp). The dish is known as lǔ wèi (滷味) in Taiwan.

Lou mei can be made from meat, offal, and other off-cuts. The most common varieties are beef, pork, duck and chicken as well as meat alternatives. For example, zaai lou mei, made with wheat gluten, is commonly found in Hong Kong. Lou mei is a core part of Hokkien and Teochew cuisine, and is widely available in regions with such populations.

Lou mei can be served cold or hot. Cold lou mei is often served with a side of hot braising liquid for immediate mixing. Hot lou mei is often served directly from the pot of braising liquid.

== Master Stock Lou Seui ==
Lou Mei is created through the slow braising of ingredients within the Master Stock, also known as Lou Seui (鹵水). Given the unique flavour of the master stock can influence the fragrance and the texture of the Lou Mei individually, the recipe for a restaurant's own Master Stock is often considered a commercial secret. The fundamental ingredients of the stock contains soy sauce, scallions, ginger, rice wine and rock sugar. Spices are often added, notably star anise, Lanxangia tsaoko, Chinese liquorice and Sichuan pepper.

Many Lou Mei diners in Hong Kong proclaim the use of a gate-kept 'Millenium-Old Master Stock' to make Lou Mei. It is believed that this stems from urban assumptions, that as meats braise within the master stock, the essence of the meat itself remains in the stock, thereby enriching the fragrance and flavor of the Lou Mei.

Contrastingly, Medical Research from Hong Kong and Taiwan has pointed out that the repeated heating of Master Stocks increases the accumulation of nitrite salts. Chemical interractions between proteins in meats and nitrite salts were found to produce nitrosamine, a potent carcinogen.

It was thus concluded that elevated consumption of Lou Mei increases the risk of gastrointestinal cancer incidence, in particular colorectal cancer. As such, doctors and nutritionists advice against the frequent consumption of Lou Mei.

== Varieties ==
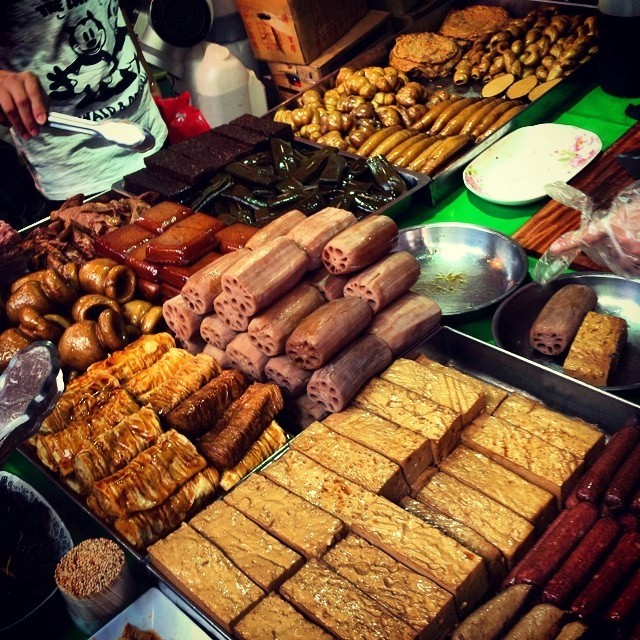
Different types of lu wei sold in Taiwan

Common varieties include:

- Chinese stewed chicken (滷雞)
- Chinese stewed duck (滷鴨)
- Duck/goose meat (鴨片/鵝片)
- Chicken wings (雞翼)
- Duck flippers (鴨掌)
- Chicken claw (雞爪)
- Tofu (豆腐)
- Pig's ear (豬耳)
- Steamed fish intestines (蒸魚腸)
- Stir-fried fish intestines (炒魚腸)
- Beef entrails (牛雜)
- Beef brisket (牛腩)
- Duck gizzard (鴨胗)
- Pig tongue (豬脷)
- pork hock (豬脚)
- Pig's blood (豬血糕)
- spiced corned egg (滷蛋)
- Kelp (海帶)
- Vegetarian (齋滷味)

== Gallery ==
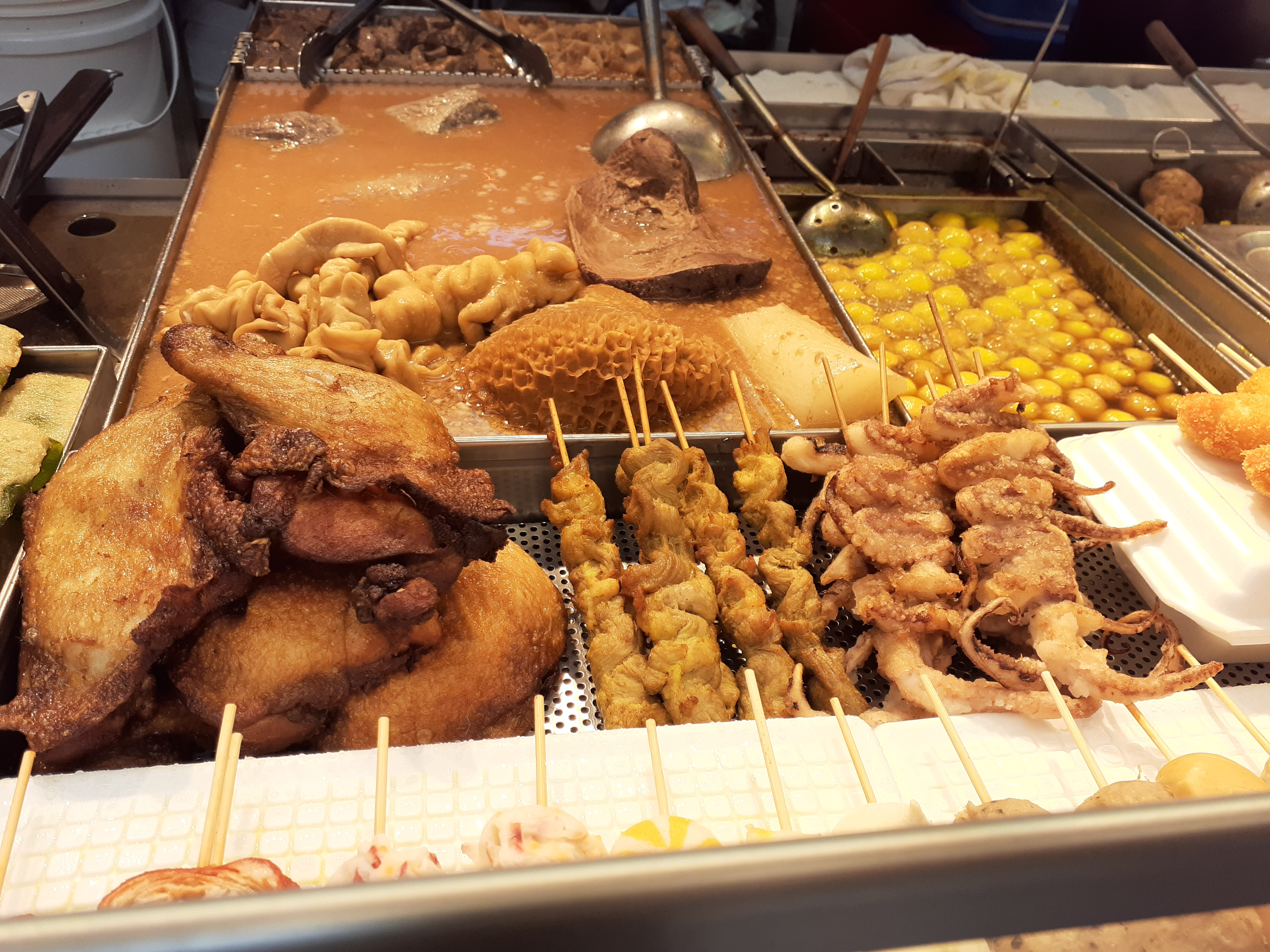

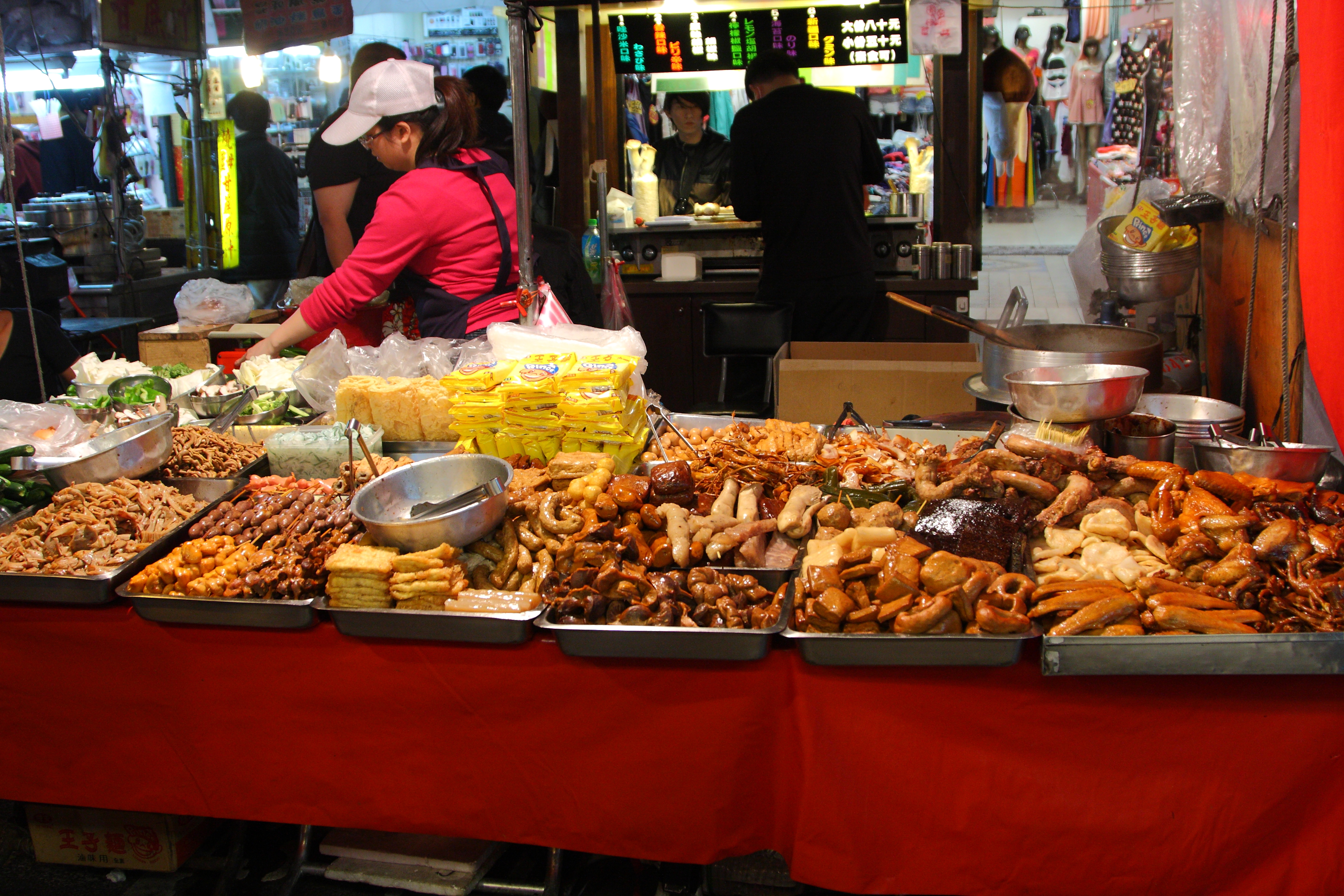

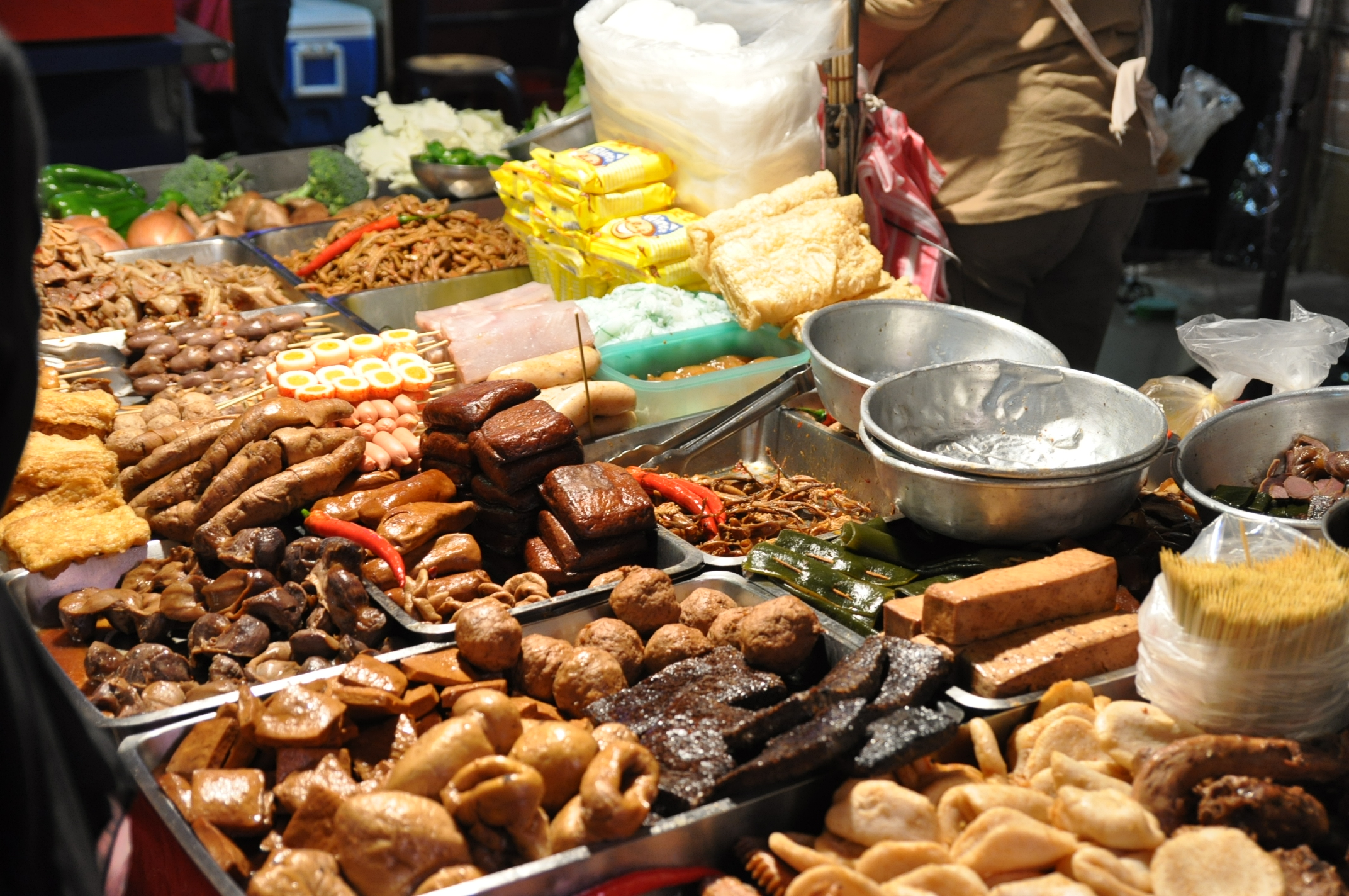

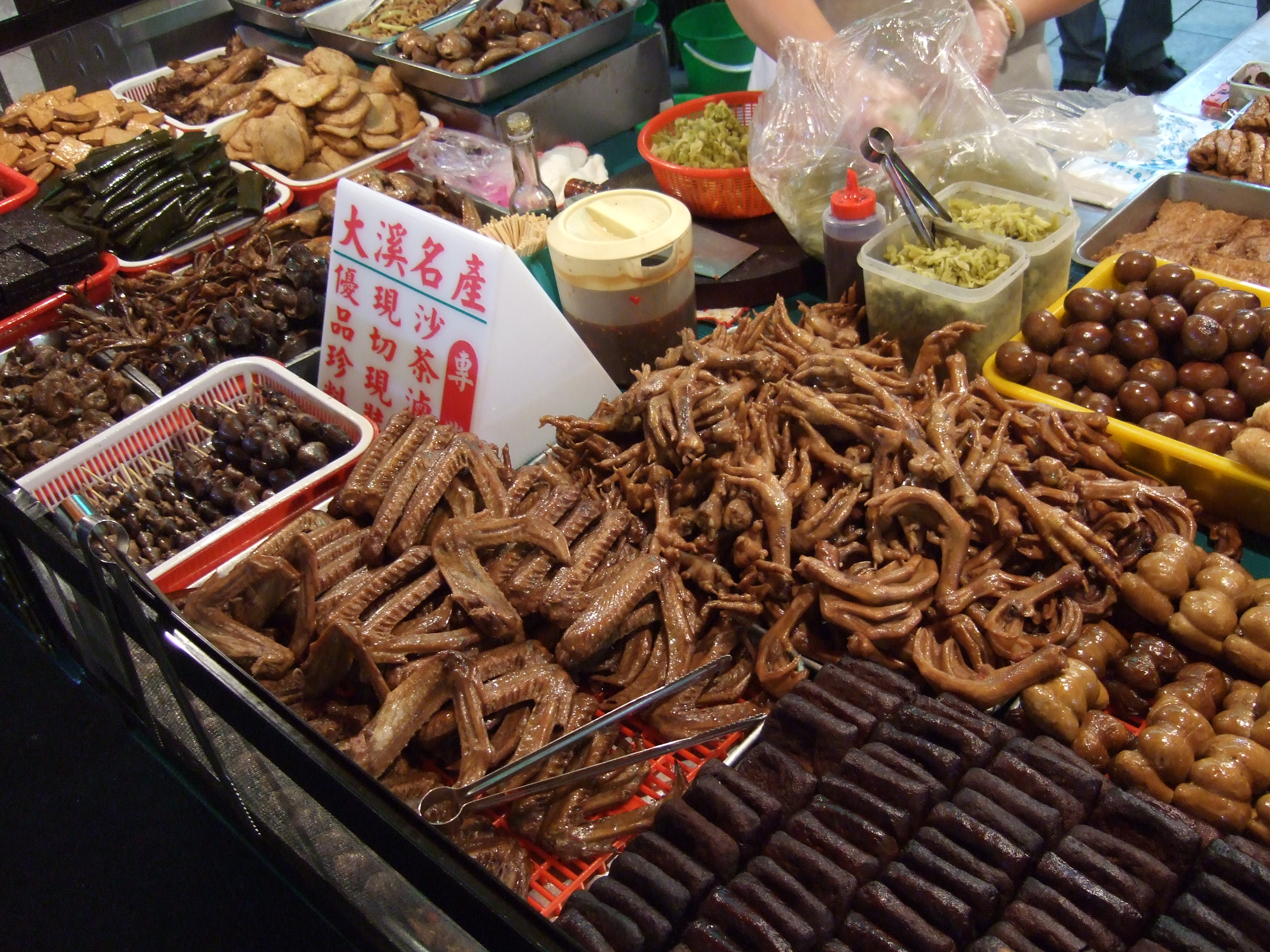

== See also ==
- Phá lấu
- Sekba
