= Master stock =

Stock that is repeatedly reused

A master stock or master sauce (traditional Chinese: 滷水; simplified Chinese: 卤水; pinyin: Lǔshuǐ; Jyutping: Lou5 Seoi2) is a stock which is repeatedly reused to poach or braise meats. It has its origins in Teochew cuisine and is typically used in Cantonese and Fujian cuisines. Foods poached or braised in the master stock are generally referred to as lou mei.

== Composition ==
Master stocks are typically begun by simmering meat and bones with typical Chinese ingredients, namely water, soy sauce, rock sugar, and Shaoxing or rice wine. Other commonly added spices and flavourings include scallions, shallots, star anise, dried citrus peel, cassia bark, sand ginger, Sichuan pepper, garlic, ginger, and dried mushrooms. The Teochew version does not include soy sauce.

== Use ==
Once the base stock has been prepared, it is used as a poaching or braising liquid for meat. Chicken is the most common meat cooked in master stock, although squab, duck, quail, and pork are also often used.

The defining characteristic of a master stock from other stocks is that after initial use, it is not discarded or turned into a soup or sauce. Instead, the broth is stored and reused in the future as a stock for more poaching. With each use, the poached meats and other ingredients absorb the stock's flavour while imparting their own back into the stock. In this way, over time, flavour accumulates in the stock, making it richer and more complex with each poaching, while subsequent poached meats absorb this flavour and likewise become more flavorful.

== In non-Chinese cultures ==
=== Japan ===
Many oden restaurants keep their broths as master stocks, straining them nightly to maintain their lightness and clarity even as their flavours grow in complexity. Otafuku, an oden restaurant in Japan, has kept its broth simmering since 1945 (an earlier batch was destroyed in WWII).

=== Thailand ===
The Bangkok restaurant Wattana Panich has kept the broth for its beef stew and beef noodle soup as a master stock for over forty years since moving to its current location.

=== United States ===
Between August 2014 and June 2015, Louro, a New York restaurant under the direction of chef David Santos, created dishes from a master stock. As part of the restaurant's social media presence, the stock was dubbed "Perpetual Stu" (a pun on "perpetual stew") and had its own Twitter account, highlighting new ingredients as it developed.

== Safety ==
After use, if the master stock will not be immediately reused, it is usually boiled, skimmed, strained and cooled quickly to kill any microorganisms in the stock. The growth of microbes in the stock can potentially spoil the flavour of the stock or pose a health risk. The stock is then refrigerated or frozen until required. Refrigerated stocks may be kept for up to three days, while frozen stocks may be kept for up to a month. If the stock is to be kept longer it must be boiled before being returned to storage.

In theory, a master stock could be sustained indefinitely if due care is taken to ensure it does not spoil.

== See also ==
- Perpetual stew
