= Pig's ear as food =

Cooked ear of pig for human consumption

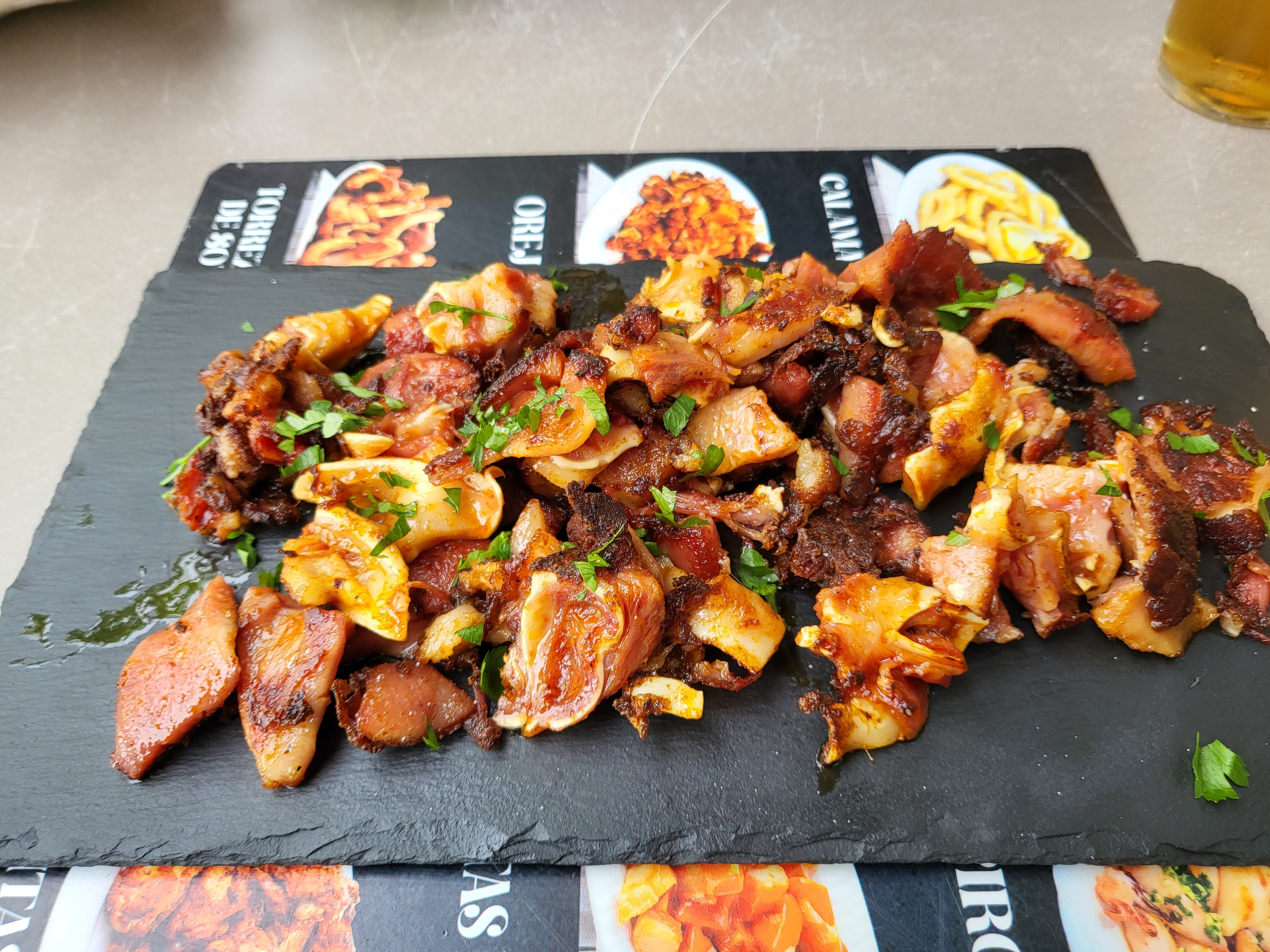
Oreja de cerdo in Madrid, Spain

Pig's ear, as food for human consumption, is the cooked ear of pig. It is found in several cuisines around the world.

== Human consumption ==
=== Bulgarian cuisine ===
In Bulgaria, a pig's ear is used as an appetizer for beer or wine. It is first boiled and then grilled with lemon, soy sauce, salt, and ground pepper.

=== Chinese cuisine ===
Pig's ear as food
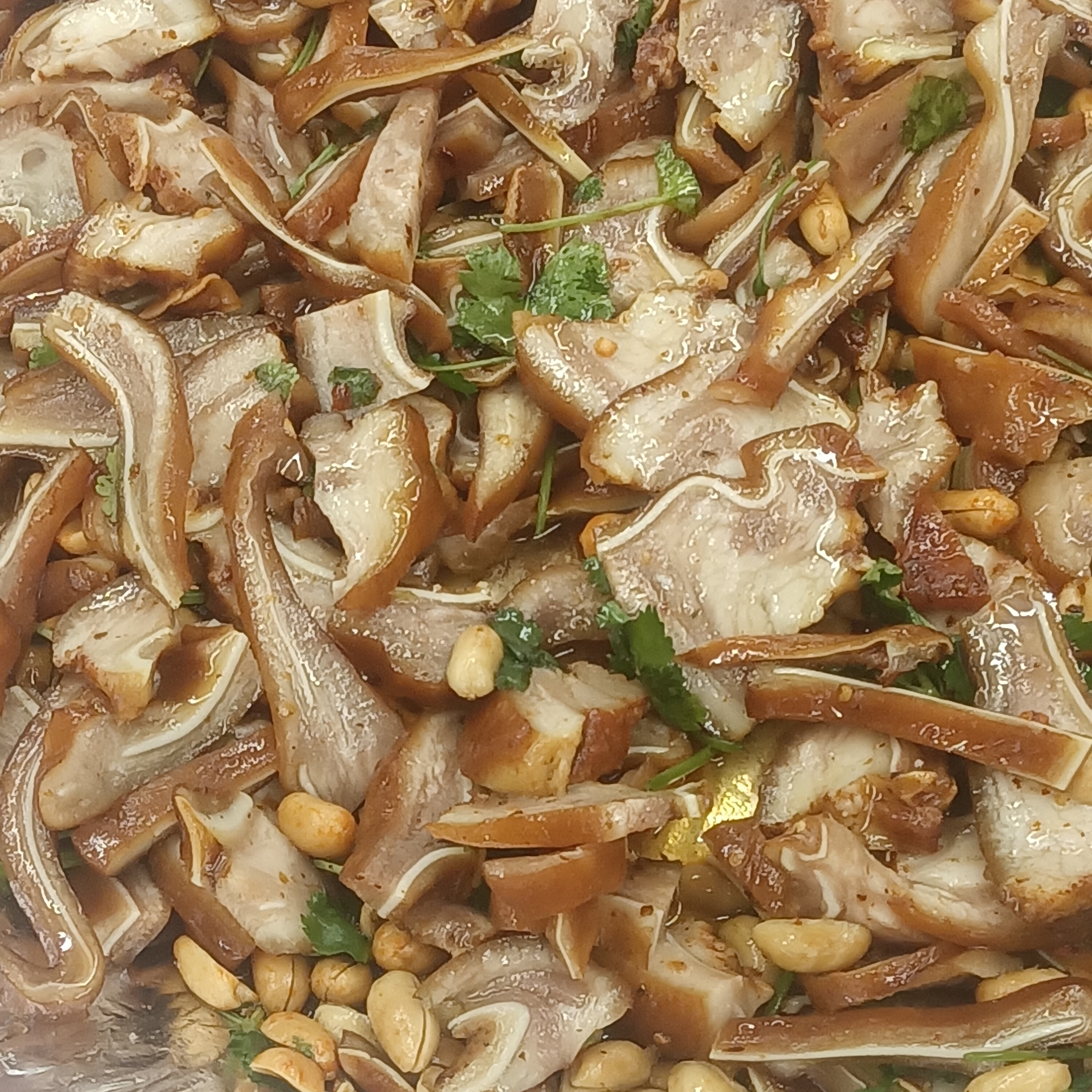
- Pig's ears braised in soy sauce and spices
- Traditional Chinese: 豬耳
- Simplified Chinese: 猪耳
- Literal meaning: pig's ear
Transcriptions
Standard Mandarin
- Hanyu Pinyin: zhu1 er3
Yue: Cantonese
- Jyutping: zyu1 ji5

In Chinese cuisine, pig's ear is often an appetizer or a side dish, called zhū ěr duo (豬耳朵 "pig's ear"), often abbreviated to zhū ěr (豬耳). In some regions, pig's ears are known as ceng ceng cui (层层脆 "layers of crunch"). It can be first boiled or stewed, and then sliced thin, served with soy sauce, or spiced with chili paste. When cooked, the outer texture is gelatinous, akin to tofu, and the center cartilage is crunchy. Pig's ear can be eaten warm or cold.

==== Cantonese cuisine ====
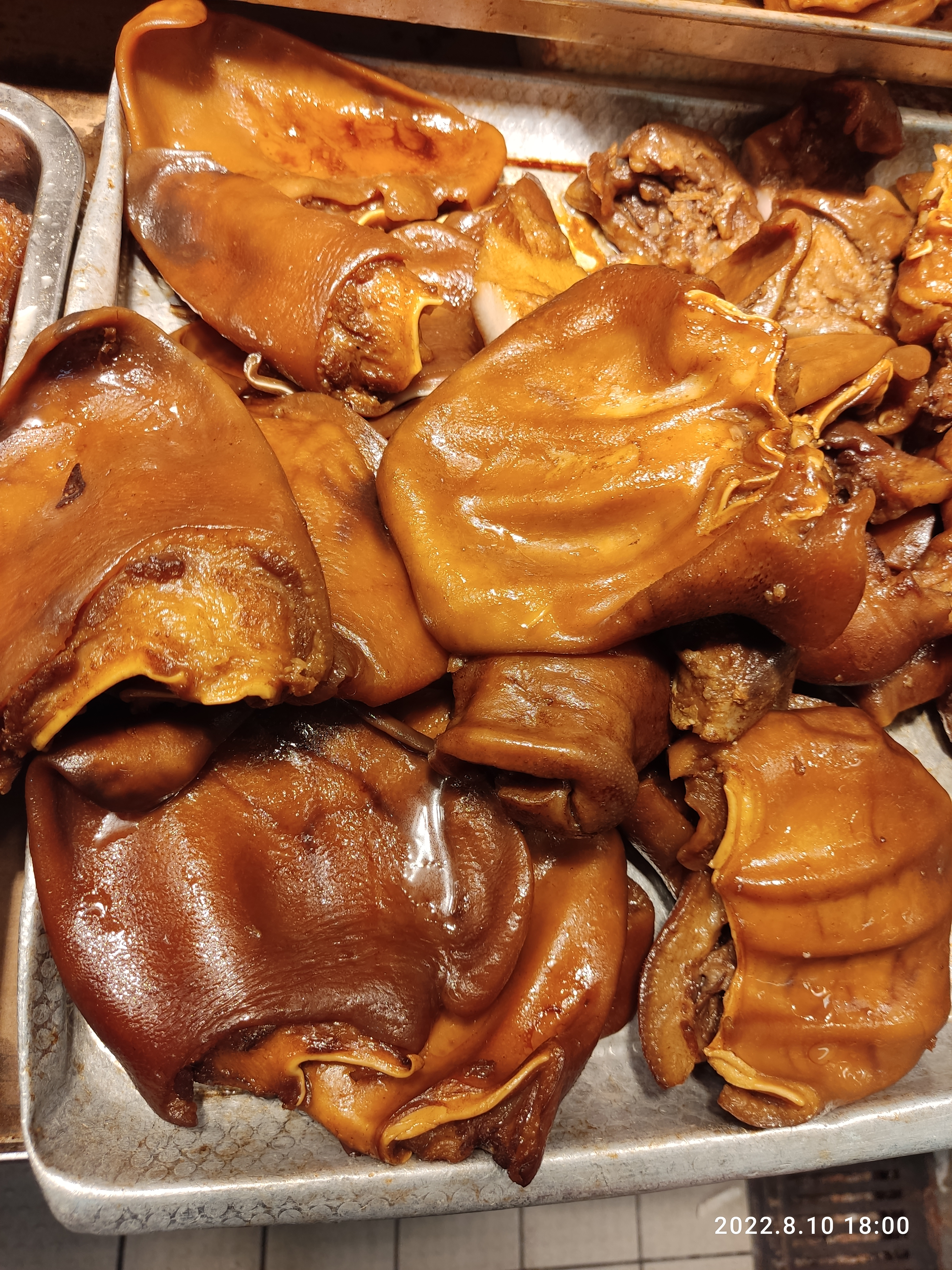
Pig's ears in Hong Kong

In Cantonese cuisine, it is another ingredient used in lou mei (braised dishes). The emphasis is on using all edible parts of the pig. Pig's ears (and lou mei in general) are not considered as delicacies.

=== Filipino cuisine ===
In the Philippines, the dish known as sisig may sometimes use pig's ears together with the animal's tail and cheeks as part of its ingredients.

=== Lithuanian cuisine ===
Pig's ear, known in Lithuania as kiaulės ausis, is served either smoked and cut into thin strips as a beer snack, or boiled whole and served as the main dish with horseradish and fresh vegetables or pickles.

=== Okinawan cuisine ===
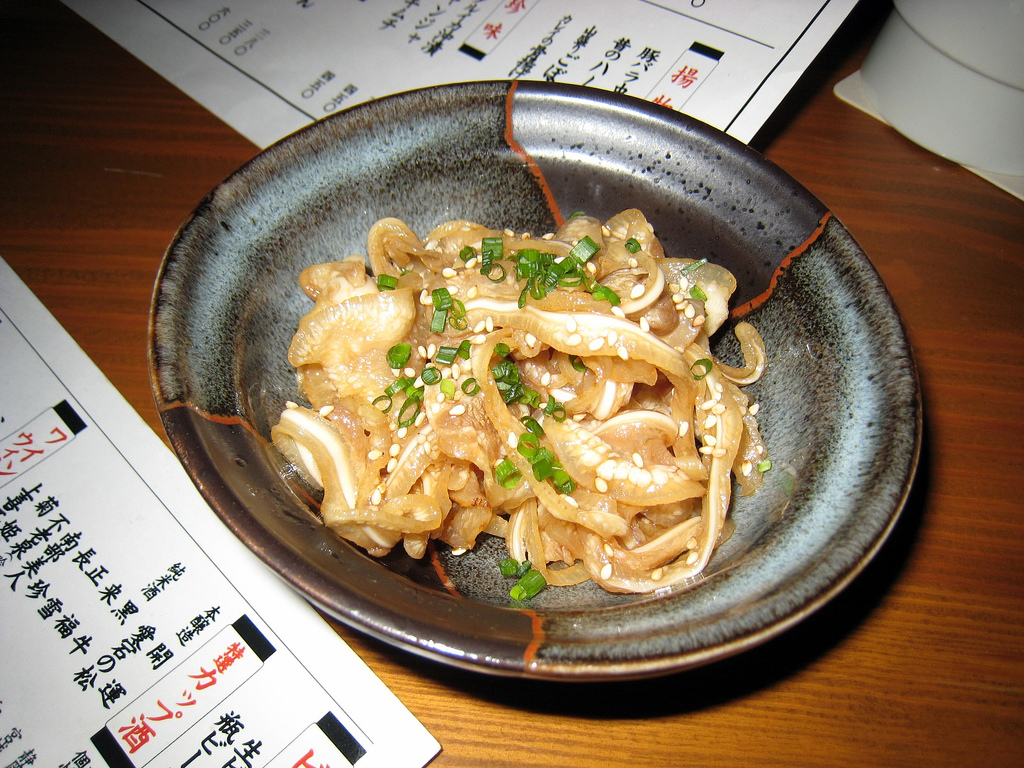
Slices of mimigā or chiragā with negi onions

In Okinawan cuisine, the pig's ear is called mimigā (Okinawan: ミミガー). It is prepared by boiling or pickling and is served with vinegar or in the form of sashimi (sliced raw meat). The entirety of the pig's face is also eaten in Okinawa, where it is known as chiragā (Okinawan: チラガー).

=== Spanish cuisine ===
In Spanish cuisine, pig's ear is served fried or grilled as oreja de cerdo, one of the tapas snacks, or boiled in many variants of stew and cocido.

=== Portuguese cuisine ===
In Portuguese cuisine, pig's ear is served boiled and then roasted, with garlic and fresh coriander as Orelha de Porco de Coentrada.

=== Thai cuisine ===
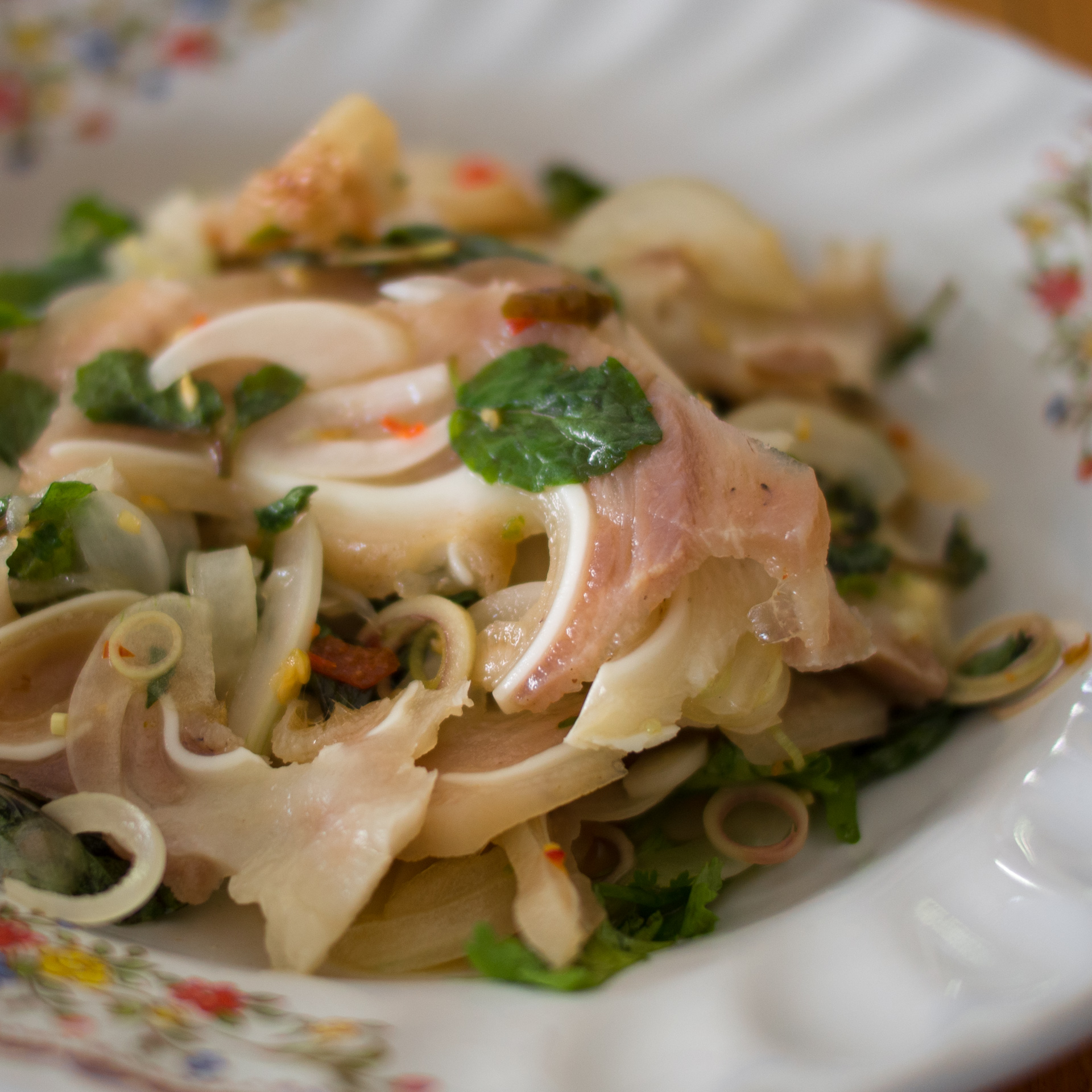
Yam hu mu is a Thai salad made with sliced pig's ears

In Thai cuisine, pig's ears are used for many different dishes, amongst others in the northern Thai dish called chin som mok (fermented sliced pig's ears grilled in a banana leaf) and in yam hu mu (a Thai salad made with sliced, boiled pig's ears).

=== United States cuisine ===
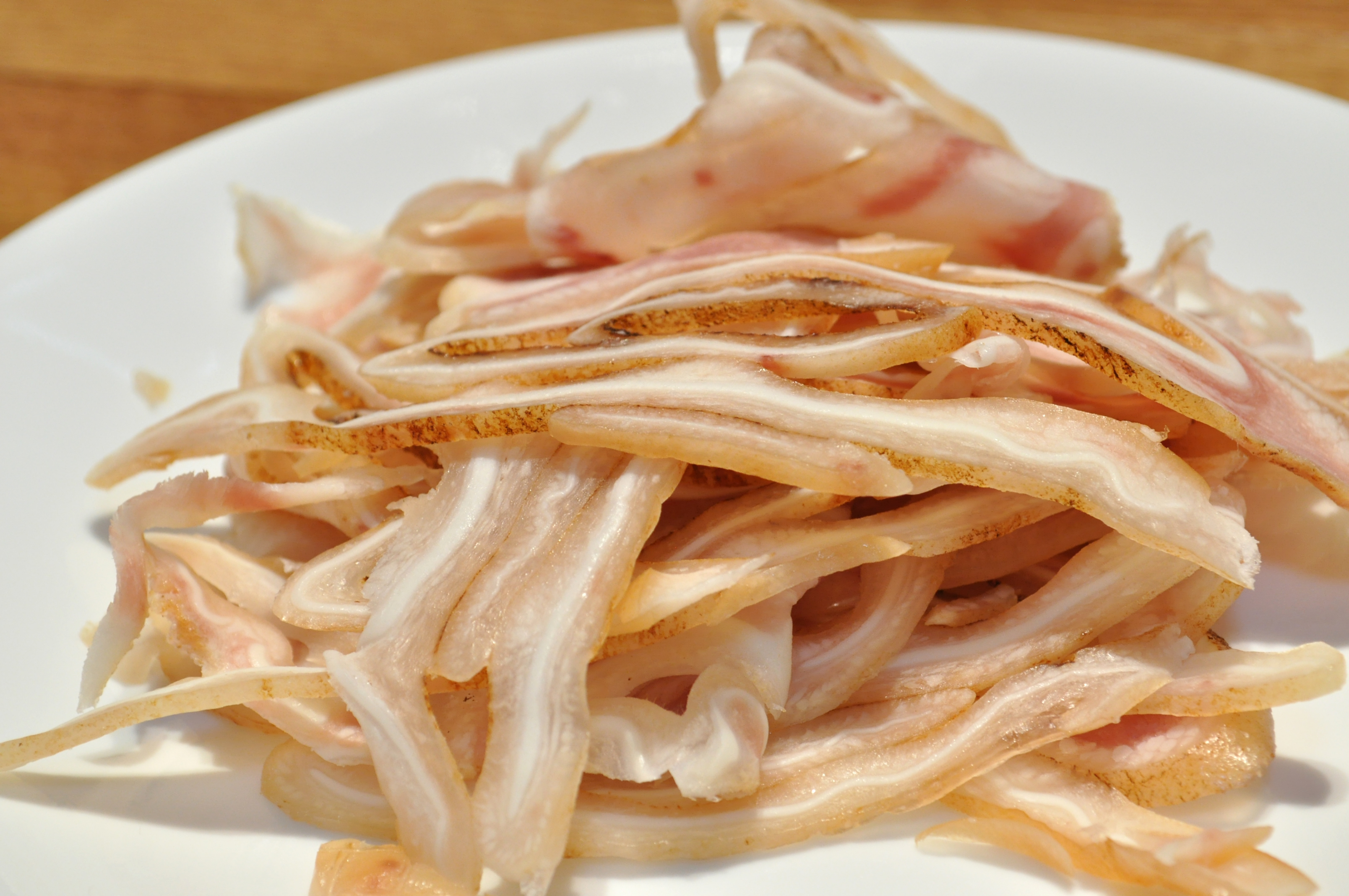
Sliced pig's ears

Pig's ears are a part of the soul food cuisine, which originated among African-Americans in the southern United States.

"Pig's ears" is also a regional colloquial name for a boiled pastry. A dough similar to pie crust is rolled out and then cut into large circles (typically 3-inches in diameter). A sweet fruit filling, or a savoury cheese filling, is placed in the centre. The pastry is folded over and then sealed with the tines of a fork. The "pig's ears" are boiled until they are done, and eaten while they are warm. They can also be "finished" after boiling by baking, deep frying or pan frying; often with powdered sugar sprinkled over them.

Livermush is a pork product that is common in Western North Carolina prepared using pig livers, pig's ears and snouts, cornmeal and spices.

=== Vietnamese cuisine ===
In Vietnamese cuisine, pig's ear is thinly sliced and mixed with roasted, finely-ground rice flour. It can either be eaten on its own or wrapped with herbs in rice paper, served with Vietnamese dipping sauce.
