= Pig fallopian tubes =

Malaysian stir-fry dish

- Type: stir-fry
- Course: main course
- Place of origin: Malaysia
- Serving temperature: hot
- Main ingredients: pig fallopian tubes

Pig fallopian tubes (Chinese: 生肠; pinyin: shēng cháng; Cantonese: sang cheong) are a traditional Malaysian stir-fry dish. They can also be an ingredient in other dishes.

== Preparation and description ==
The dish is prepared by stir-frying fallopian tubes (sometimes the uterus) of pigs and serving chopped with vegetables and sauce such as Kung Pao sauce or soy sauce with ginger and onions; the meat is relatively flavorless but is a good vehicle for the sauce. Other protein sources such as dried shrimp may be added. The texture of the meat has been described as combining crunch with springiness. Although traditional, the dish is not often served in Singapore. It is popular among the Cantonese and Hakka, and Chinese people in Kuala Lumpur and Ipoh.

Pig fallopian tubes can also be an ingredient in other dishes, such as congee or kway chap.

== Culture ==
Consumption of pig fallopian tubes is said to have a beneficial effect on women's fertility.

The ingredient is sometimes called "birth intestines" (a literal translation of 生肠). Compared to real intestines, fallopian tubes can be more expensive because they are harder to source and require less cleaning.
