= Malay cuisine =

Cuisine of Malay people

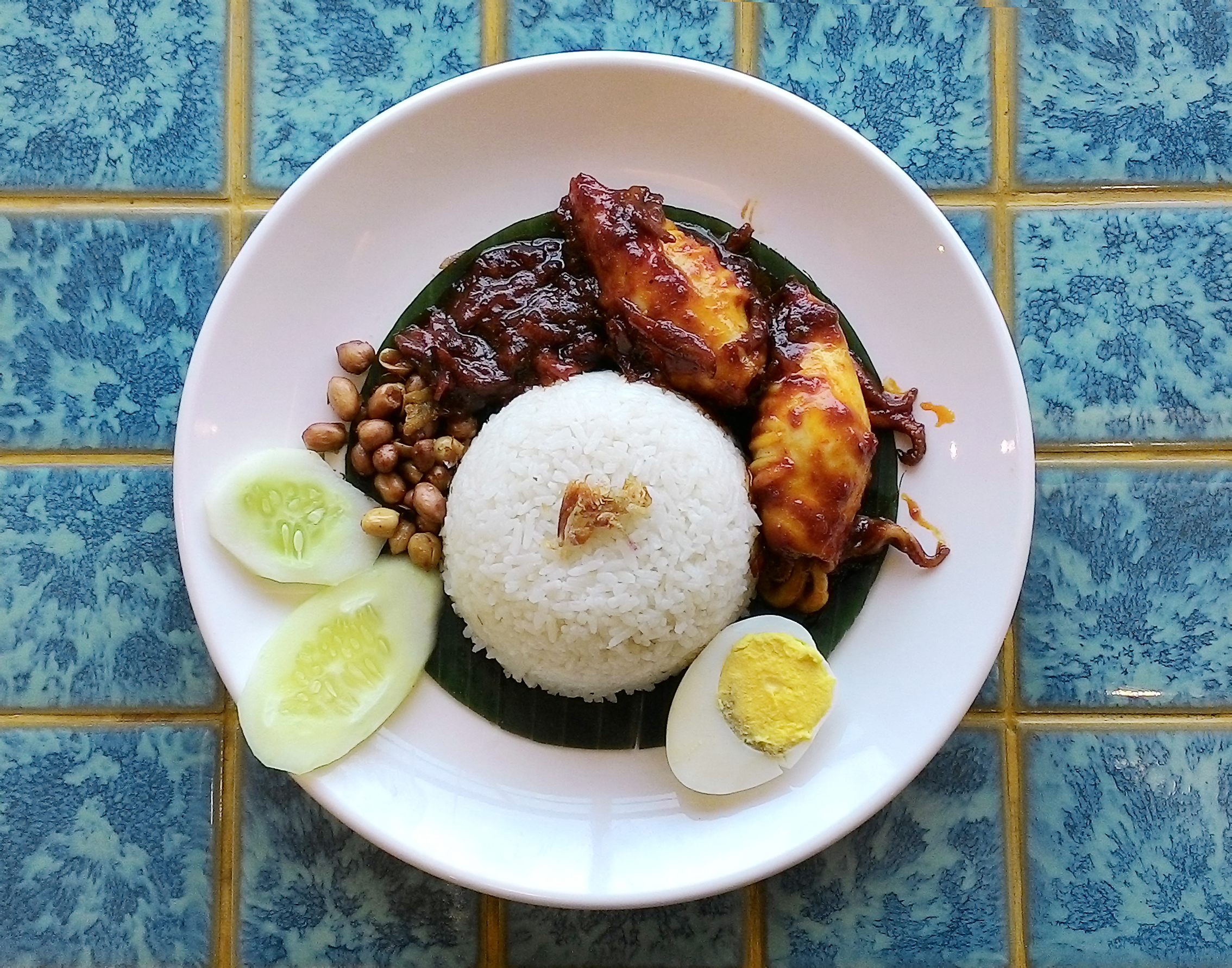
Nasi lemak is a versatile, fragrant coconut rice dish served with various accompaniments, such as eggs (sunny side up or boiled), sambal sotong, rendang, or ayam goreng. It is the most defining feature of a Malay-style breakfast.

Malay cuisine (Malay: Masakan Melayu; Jawi: ماسقن ملايو) is the traditional food of the Malays.

The main characteristic of traditional Malay cuisine is the generous use of spices: particularly a main combination of cinnamon, clove, star anise and cardamom known as the "four siblings" (empat beradik); lemongrass and galangal is also plentiful. Coconut milk is also important in giving Malay dishes their rich, creamy character. The other foundation is belacan (prawn paste), used as a base for sambal, a rich sauce or condiment made from mixing with chilli peppers, onions and garlic.

Nearly every Malay meal is served with a staple of rice, as is in many other Asian cultures. Although there are various types of dishes in a Malay meal, all are served at once, not in courses. A typical meal consists of a plate of rice for each person on the table. Dishes are meant to be shared among the diners; each dish is provided with a spoon, and each diner spoons the dishes of their choosing onto their rice plate. Food is eaten delicately with the fingers of the right hand, never with the left (which is used for personal ablutions); Malays rarely use utensils.

== History and influences ==
It is uncertain when the Malay culinary traditions took shape, but the earliest record of the tradition is from the 15th century when the Malacca Sultanate became an important trade centre in the Malay Archipelago. The most important legacy of Malacca derived from its involvement in the spice trade, its openness to the ingredients and culinary techniques introduced by foreigners (notably the Arabs, Persians, Chinese and Indians) and its cultivation of a rich eclectic gastronomy. Malacca was also a catalyst for the development of two other rich and distinctive culinary cultures: the fusion of Malay with Chinese and European traditions, in cuisines respectively known as Nyonya and Eurasian. In the centuries before and after Malacca, there were other non-Malay groups, from Buginese and Javanese to Minangkabau, who were absorbed into Malay society at different times, aided by similarity in lifestyle and a common religion, and had varying degrees of influence on Malay food.

It is important to understand the nuance and differences of what makes a dish "Malay", which is intertwined with the differences between the concept of Malay as an ethnic group or as a race. In modern-day Indonesia, Malay cuisine is understood sensu stricto to the cuisine of ethnic Malay people traditionally inhabiting the east coast of Sumatra, the Malay Peninsula and coastal Borneo. In Malaysia, Singapore, Brunei and outside the Malay Archipelago (such as Sri Lanka and South Africa) however, the term "Malay cuisine" often takes a broader scope, which includes the culinary traditions of other neighbouring common Austronesian peoples, often including Minangkabaus, Javanese and Bugis, or even their fusion derivatives.

Nasi lemak, rice cooked in rich coconut milk, is probably the most common and best liked dish, ubiquitous in Malay towns and villages. Nasi lemak is considered Malaysia's national dish. Another example is ketupat or nasi himpit, compressed rice cooked in palm leaves. It is eaten especially often during Hari Raya. Various meats and vegetables can be made into gulai or kari, a type of curry dish with variations of spice mixtures that display an Indian influence long present in Malay cuisine. Since most Malays are Muslims, Malay cuisine rigorously observes Islamic halal dietary law. Protein intake is mostly taken from beef, water buffalo, goat, and lamb, and also includes poultry and fish. Pork, non-halal meat, and alcohol are prohibited. Laksa, a fusion of Malay and Chinese cuisine, is also frequently served. Malay cuisine has also adopted some neighbouring food traditions, such as rendang, adopted from Minangkabau cuisine, in Sumatra, and nasi ulam from Betawi cuisine and satays from Javanese cuisine in Java. However, the Malays have developed distinctive tastes and recipes.

Malay cuisine has also spread outside the Malay Archipelago and influenced other cuisine there. Bobotie is a South African dish with its origins in Cape Malay. It consists of spiced minced meat baked with an egg-based topping. Of the many dishes common to South Africa, bobotie is perhaps closest to being the national dish because it is not commonly found in any other country. The recipe originates from the Dutch East India Company colonies in Batavia, with the name derived from the Indonesian bobotok. In other countries, kalu dodol is a Sri Lankan dessert with Sri Lankan Malay origins. It consists of kithul jaggery (from the sap of the toddy palm), rice flour and coconut milk.

== Terminology ==
Malay food terminology covers all stages of preparation and cooking methods, shaped by cultural transmission over many generations. Traditionally Malay parents would pass down the skills and processes of cooking to their children through daily cooking activities as well as traditional events, including wedding ceremonies.

=== Food preparation ===
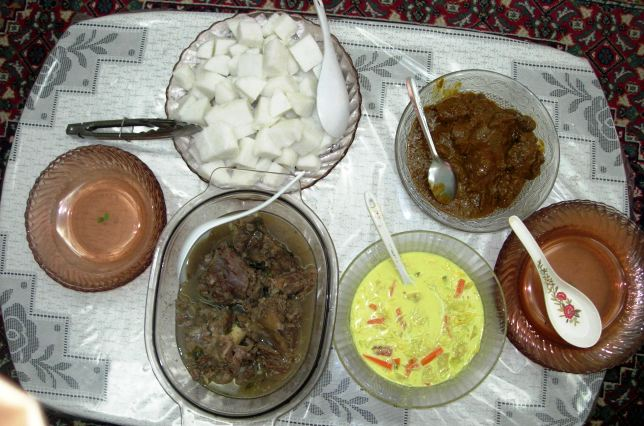
Typical festive fare during Hari Raya Puasa or Hari Raya Haji (clockwise from bottom left): beef soup, nasi himpit (compressed rice cubes), beef rendang and sayur lodeh

In Malay food preparation, the ingredients used are often described as spicy and flavorful as it is a melting pot of spices, herbs and roots. Strong, tangy and flavorful fresh herbs, spices and ingredients such as serai (lemongrass), pandan (screwpine), kemangi (a type of basil), kesum (polygonum), buah pala (nutmeg), kunyit (turmeric) and bunga kantan (wild ginger buds), biji sawi (mustard seeds) and halba (fenugreek) are often used. There are also a number of terms used for the equipment and utensils used for food preparation. Traditional cooking equipment includes several types of grinders including pestle and mortar, (lesung batu) stone rollers (batu giling, akin to a silbatta or metate), and the millstone (batu boh) used for preparing spices and pastes. Vegetables are diced on a landas (wooden cutting board); a coconut scraper (kukur nyiur) is indispensable in making both curries and sweets. Pastries are also made for desserts, and for this a rolling pin (torak) and board (papan penorak or papan canai) are considered essential.

=== Cooking methods ===
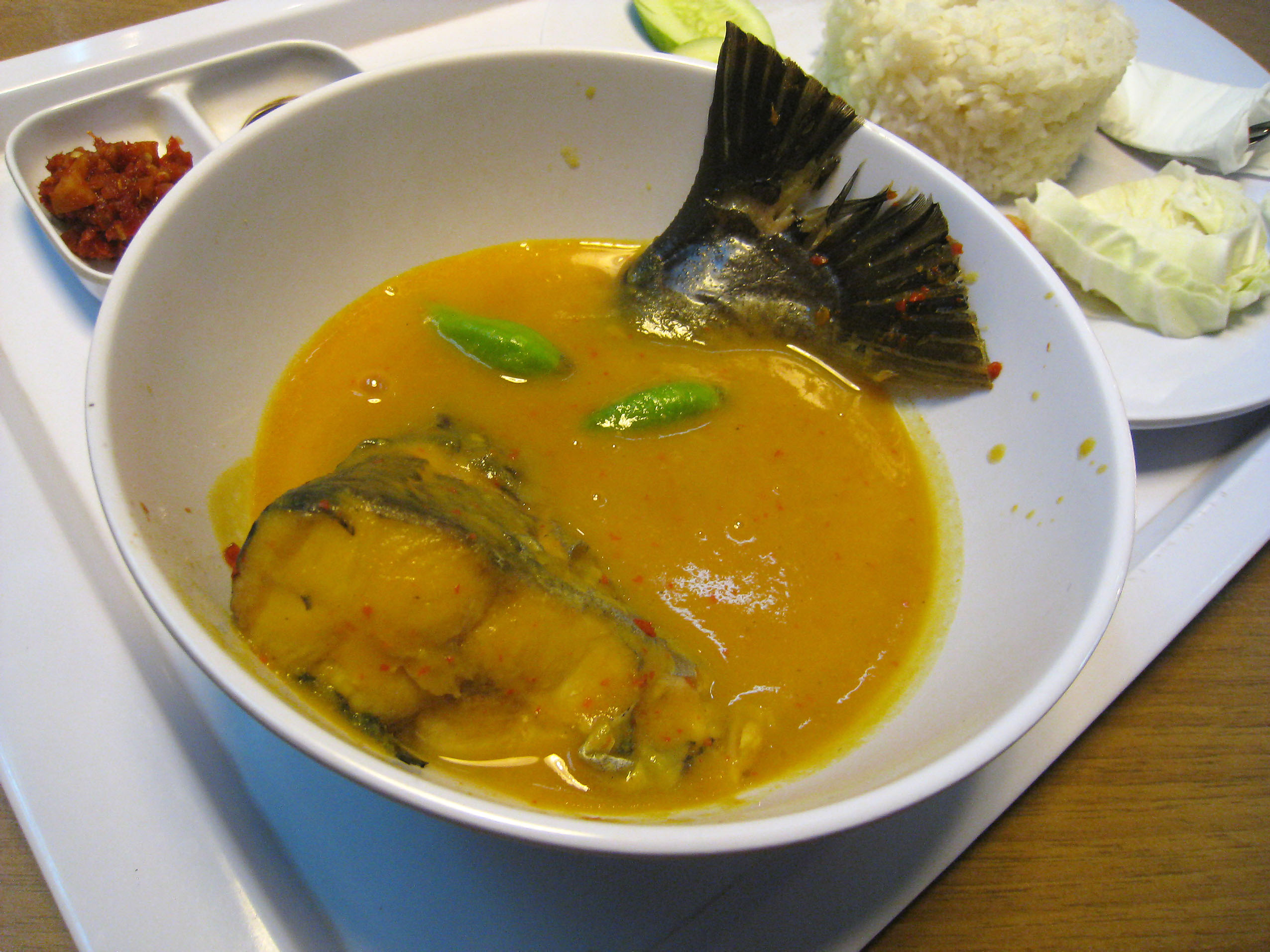
Tempoyak ikan patin, pangasius fish in fermented durian sauce

Traditional cooking methods in Malay cuisine are quite similar to life in Malay villages, slow and relaxed, as most Malay food is cooked on low heat for a long time compared to Chinese food. There are numerous methods of cooking which consist of dry and moist methods. Tumis (sautéing i.e. using a small amount of oil or fat in a shallow pan over relatively high heat), salai (food smoked or grilled with the ingredients often cut into pieces or thinly sliced to facilitate fast cooking), sangai (food, mainly dried spices, fried without oil), and layur (warmed over low heat to dry) are examples of terms for dry-heat cooking methods. On the other hand, moist-heat cooking methods includes terms such as tanak (cooking in a pot, especially rice), jerang (boiling or simmering), celur (blanching or dipping food such as vegetables into hot water) and reneh (simmering or boiling food).

=== Characteristics ===
As defined by Ainuddin, Malay food has five characteristics:

- It is rich in herbs and spices;
- Coconut milk is one of the main ingredients;
- It is usually spicy;
- Meat is usually stewed with a thick gravy; and
- Fried fish and seafood are usually seasoned with turmeric powder.

== Regional cuisine variations ==
=== Brunei ===
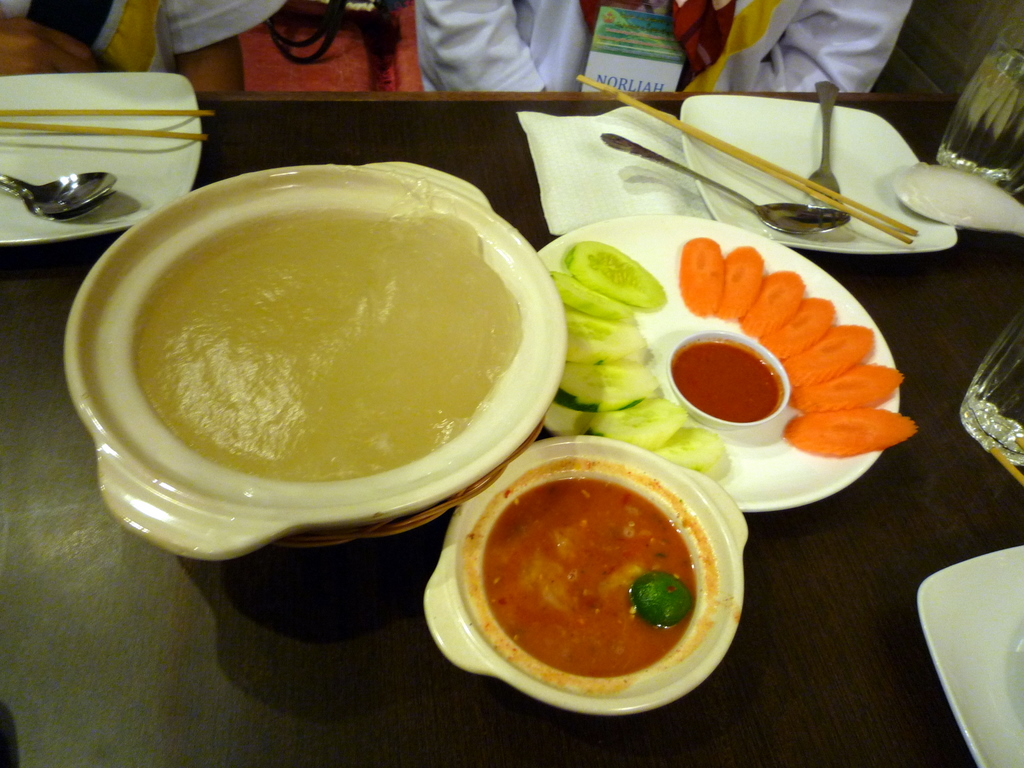
Ambuyat, national dish of Brunei

Bruneian Malay cuisine is often spicy and commonly eaten with either rice or noodles. Beef rendang, nasi lemak and pajeri nanas are frequently served in Brunei. Among the few dishes peculiar to Brunei is ambuyat, a sticky ball of flavourless sago starch, which is wrapped around a bamboo fork and dipped into a spicy and sour gravy.

Nasi katok, which literally means 'knock rice', is a commonly served meal which consists of plain rice, fried chicken and sambal, a spicy relish made from ground chilli peppers and a variety of secondary ingredients including shrimp paste, garlic, ginger, shallot, scallion, palm sugar, lime juice, vinegar and anchovies. Nasi katok is traditionally served wrapped in brown paper.

=== Indonesia ===
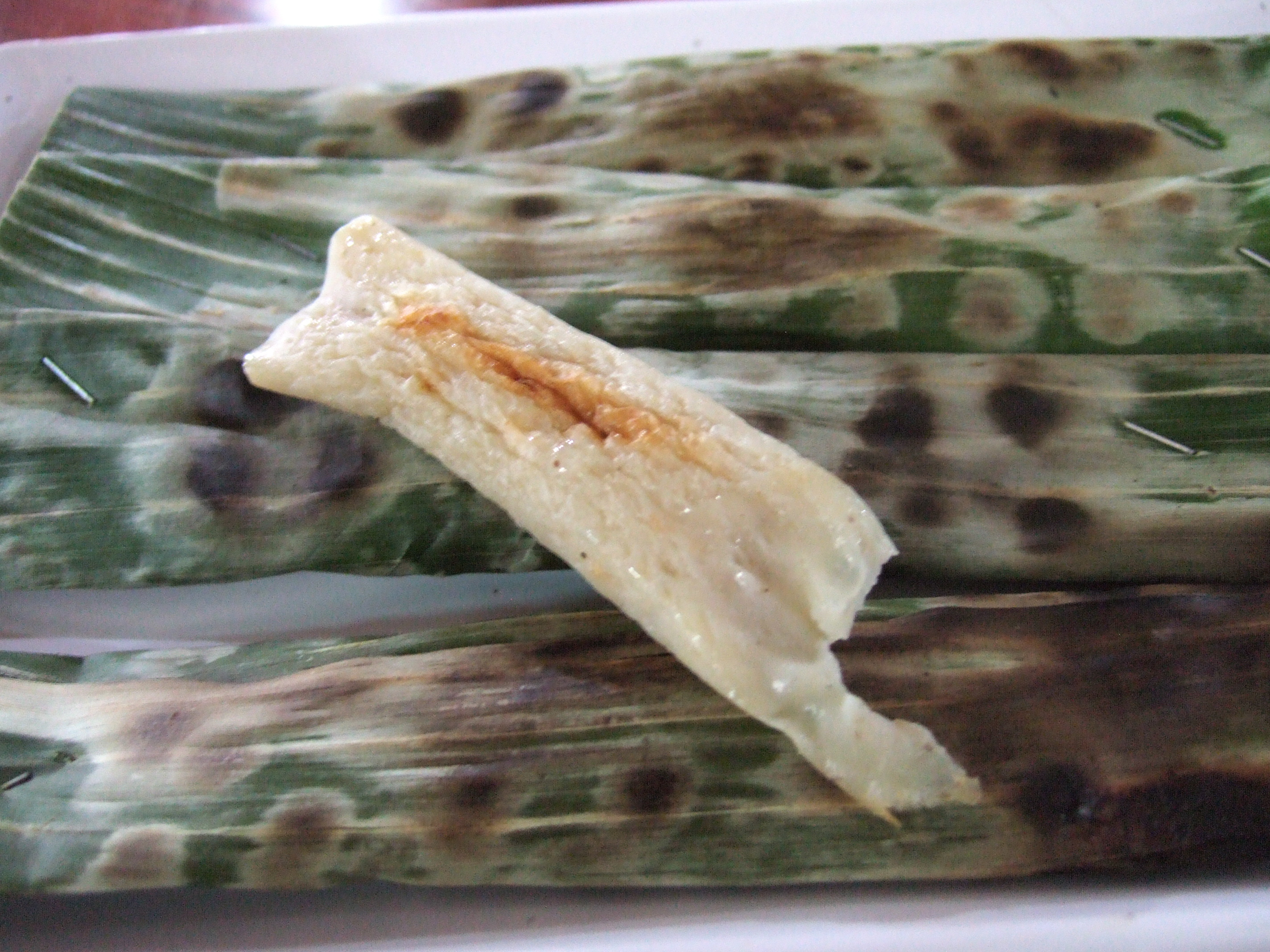
Otak-otak in banana leaf

The cuisine of Malay Indonesians spread on the east coast of Sumatra and Kalimantan, primarily West Kalimantan. Because of the close ethnic kinship and proximity to Malaysian Malays, many dishes are shared between the two countries. For example, nasi lemak and nasi ulam are considered native dishes of Riau and Jambi. Malay cuisine also shares many similarities with the neighboring Minangkabau cuisine of West Sumatra, Palembangese cuisine of South Sumatra and Acehnese cuisine of Aceh, such as sharing gulai, asam pedas, kari, lemang, nasi minyak, pempek, pindang, rendang and roti canai. This is due to the fact that the Minangkabaus are culturally closely related to the Malays. Malay Indonesian cuisine has also been influenced by Arab Indonesian, Betawi, Chinese Indonesian, Indian Indonesian and Javanese cuisine.

Otak-otak is a dish involving fish pieces wrapped in banana leaves. The grilled fish cake is made of ground fish mixed with tapioca starch and spices.

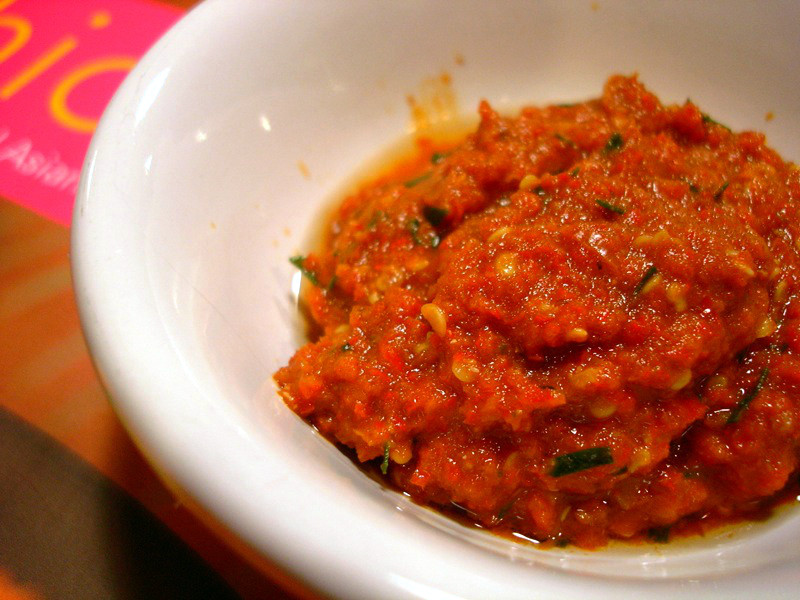
Sambal belacan made of fresh chillies and belacan

Tempoyak is a fermented durian sauce and sambal belacan is a Malay-style sambal made of fresh chillies and toasted belacan in a stone mortar. Both are familiar condiments in Sumatra.

Other Malay Indonesian dishes include acar, amplang, ayam goreng, ayam pansuh, ayam penyet, ayam percik, begedil, bihun goreng, bobotok, bubur asyura, bubur cha cha, bubur lambuk, bubur pedas, cincalok, epok-epok, various gulai, ikan bakar, various ikan patin dishes, kangkung belacan, kemplang, ketupat, kwetiau goreng, various laksa, lepat, lontong, martabak, mi celor, mi goreng, mi kari, mi rebus, nasi ambeng, nasi briyani, various nasi goreng, nasi kari, nasi kebuli, pekasam, rojak, roti jala, roti john, roti tisu, sambal sotong, samosa, satay, sayur lodeh, various siput gonggong dishes, soto, soto mi, sup ikan, sup kambing, sup rusa, tauhu goreng, tekwan, terang bulan and ulam.

=== Malaysia ===
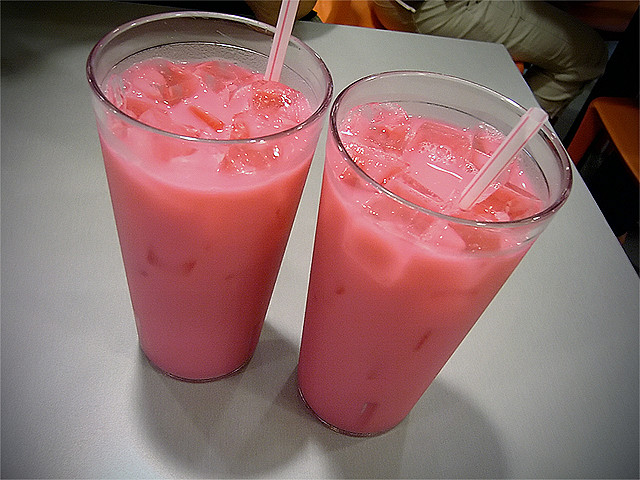
Sirap bandung drinks

Malaysian Malay cuisine bears many similarities thus overlapping to Malay Indonesian cuisine. It has also been influenced by Chinese, Indian, Thai, Javanese and Minangkabau cuisine. Many Malay dishes revolve around the rempah, which is usually sauteed in oil to draw out its flavours to form the base of a dish. A dipping relish called sambal is an essential accompaniment for most Malay dishes.

Nasi lemak is rice cooked in rich coconut milk and considered Malaysia's national dish.

The drink sirap bandung consists of evaporated or condensed milk flavoured with rose syrup, giving it a pink colour. The drink is an adaptation of rose milk from India.

Other Malay dishes in Malaysia include apam balik, ayam goreng, ayam masak merah, ayam pansuh, ayam percik, bubur pedas, char kway teow, cincalok, ikan bakar, various kari, karipap, kebebe, kerabu, keropok lekor, kerutuk daging, various laksa, Maggi goreng, masak lemak, mee bandung, mee Jawa, mee kolo, mee siam, mee soto, mee wantan, nasi ambeng, nasi beriani, nasi dagang, nasi kerabu, nasi goreng, nasi paprik, nasi tumpang, pek nga, roti canai, roti john, satay, taugeh ayam, tempoyak and ulam.

=== Singapore ===
Situated between Malaysia and Indonesia, Singaporean Malay dishes are influenced by the food of the neighbouring Malay Peninsula, Sumatra, Java and the Riau Islands. Despite absorbing regional influences, it tends to be adapted to local tastes and differ from its counterparts in neighbouring countries. Hence, Singaporean Malay cuisine features a unique set of influences, especially from Minangkabau and Javanese cuisine.

Dendeng is a thinly sliced dried meat. It is preserved through a mixture of sugar and spices and dried via a frying process and shows Minangkabau influences.

Other Malay Singaporean dishes include assam pedas, bakso, curry puff, gulai daun ubi, Katong laksa, ketupat, lemak siput, mee siam, mee goreng, naan, nasi goreng, nasi lemak, nasi padang, rojak bandung, roti john, sambal stingray, satay, satay bee hoon, soto and sup tulang.

=== South Africa ===
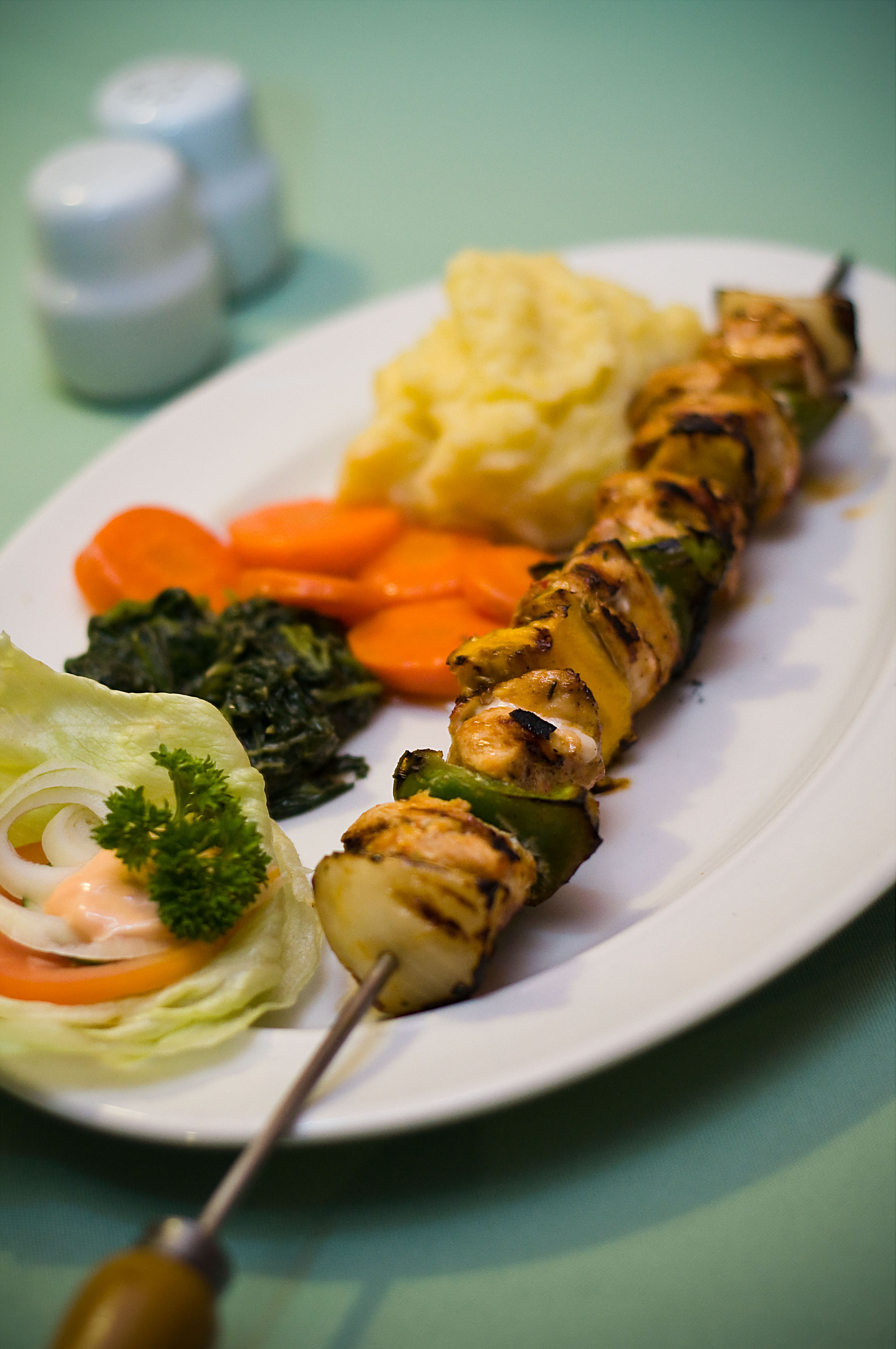
Sosatie made up of chicken

Cape Malay cuisine is a tradition of the Cape Malay people in South Africa. It has been influenced by Malay and Javanese cuisine. Thus, Cape Malay influence has brought spicy curries, sambals, pickled fish and a variety of fish stews to South Africa. Adaptations of traditional foods such as bobotie and sosatie are staples in many South African homes. Faldela Williams wrote three cookbooks, including the Cape Malay Cookbook, which was instrumental in preserving the cultural traditions of Cape Malay cuisine.

Sosatie is a traditional Cape Malay dish of meat (usually lamb or mutton) cooked on skewers. The term is derived from sate (skewered meat) and saus (spicy sauce). To prepare it, mutton chunks are marinated overnight in fried onions, chillies, garlic, curry leaves and tamarind juice, then threaded on skewers and either pan-fried or grilled.

Cape Malay yellow rice, a sweet dish made with raisins, cinnamon and sugar, also has its origins in Cape Malay cookery, often referred to as Cape Malay yellow rice.

Other Cape Malay dishes include biryani, boeber, chutney, falooda, frikkadel, koesister, roti, sambals, samoosa and tomato bredie.

=== Sri Lanka ===
Sri Lankan Malay cuisine has played a significant role in shaping Sri Lankan cuisine. Achcharu is a dish that originates from the local Malay community and is now widely popular among all ethnic groups in the country. It is a selection of vegetables in a pickled sauce and blends sweet, sour and spicy flavours. Mee goreng and nasi goreng are also popular, a result of cultural influences from Indonesia and the country's Malay community.

Other Sri Lankan Malay dishes include varieties of curry, ekor sop, kalu dodol, sambals and watalappam.

== List of Malay dishes ==
Malay cuisine

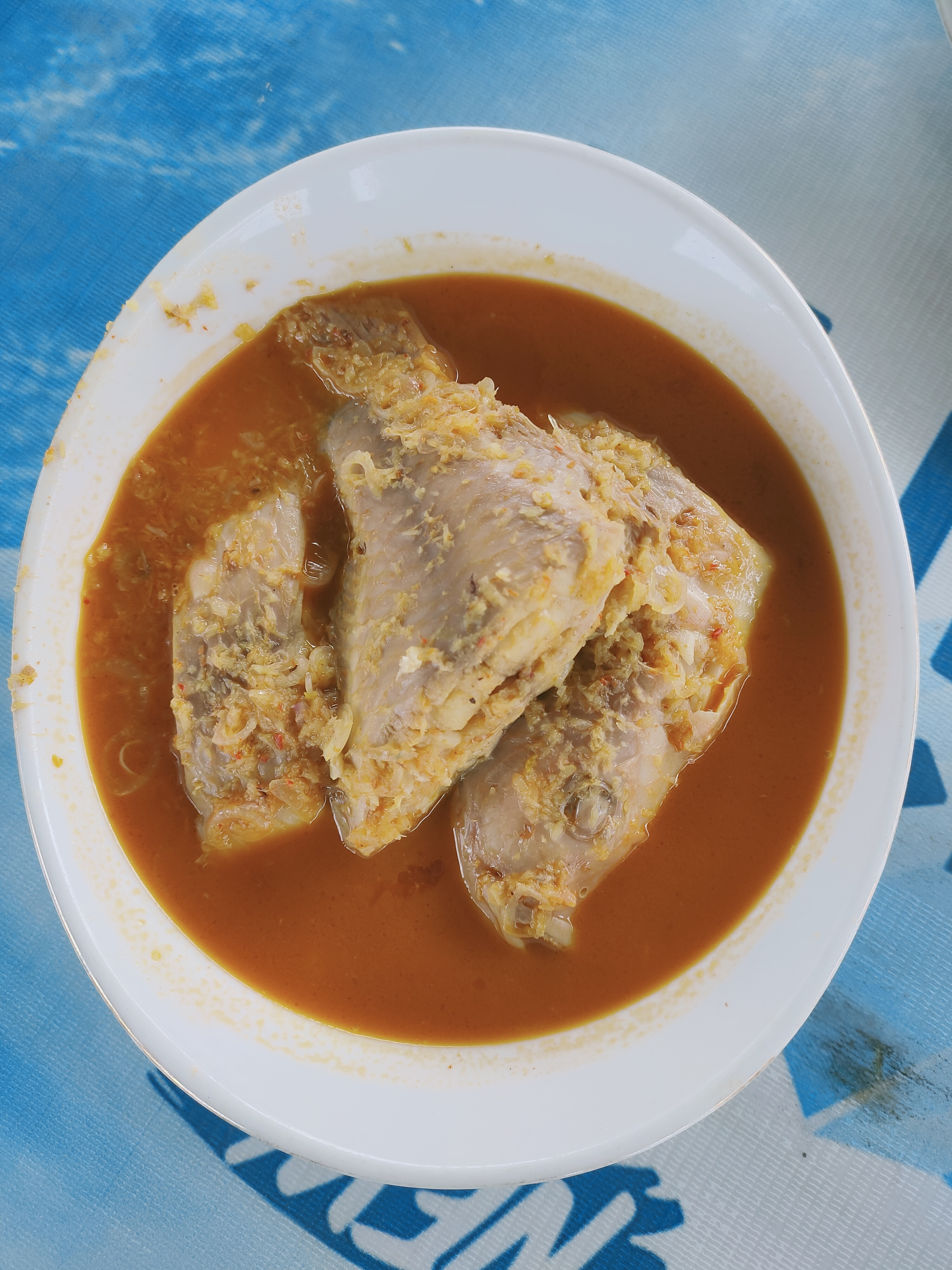
Asam pedas

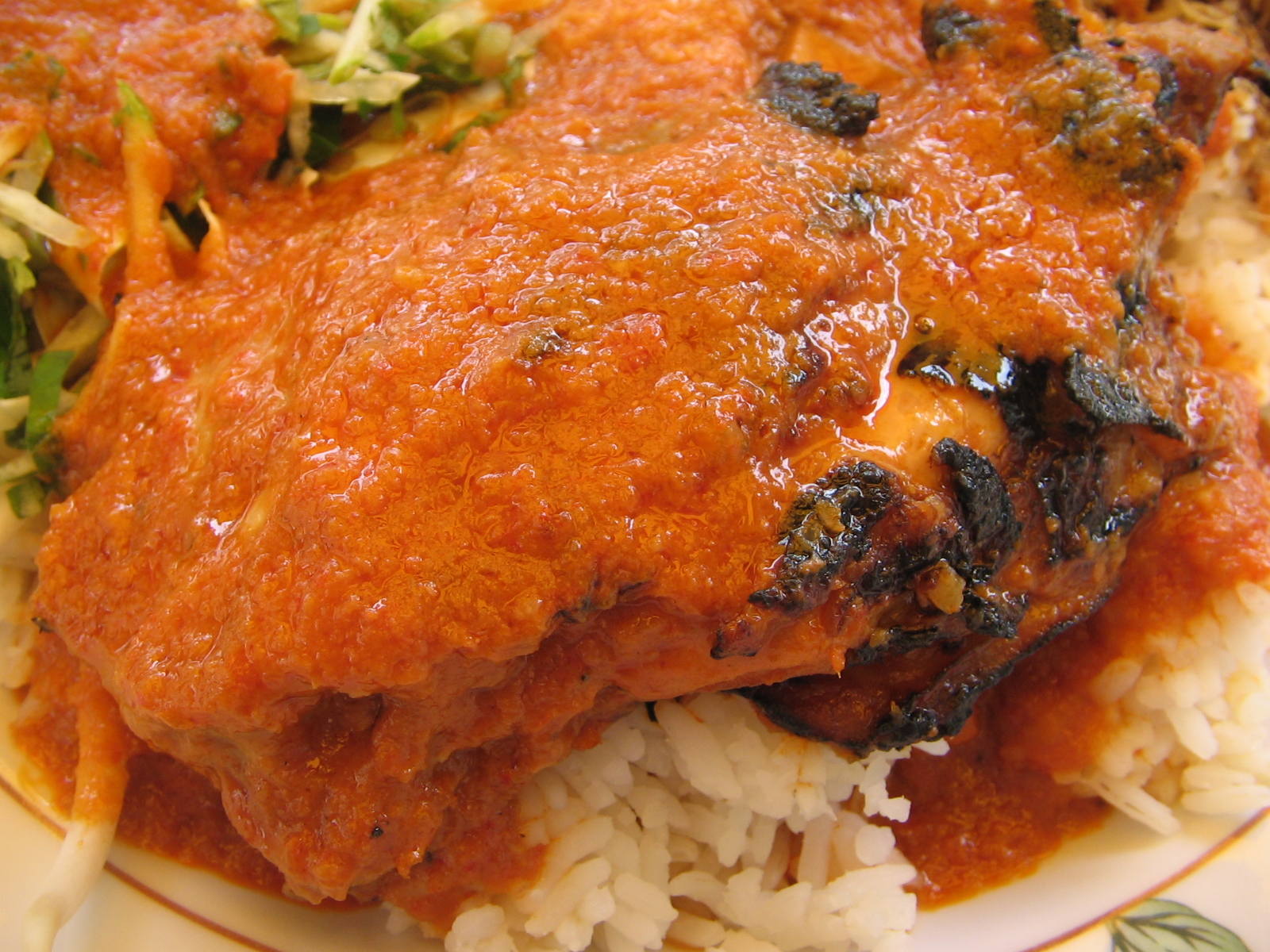
Ayam golek

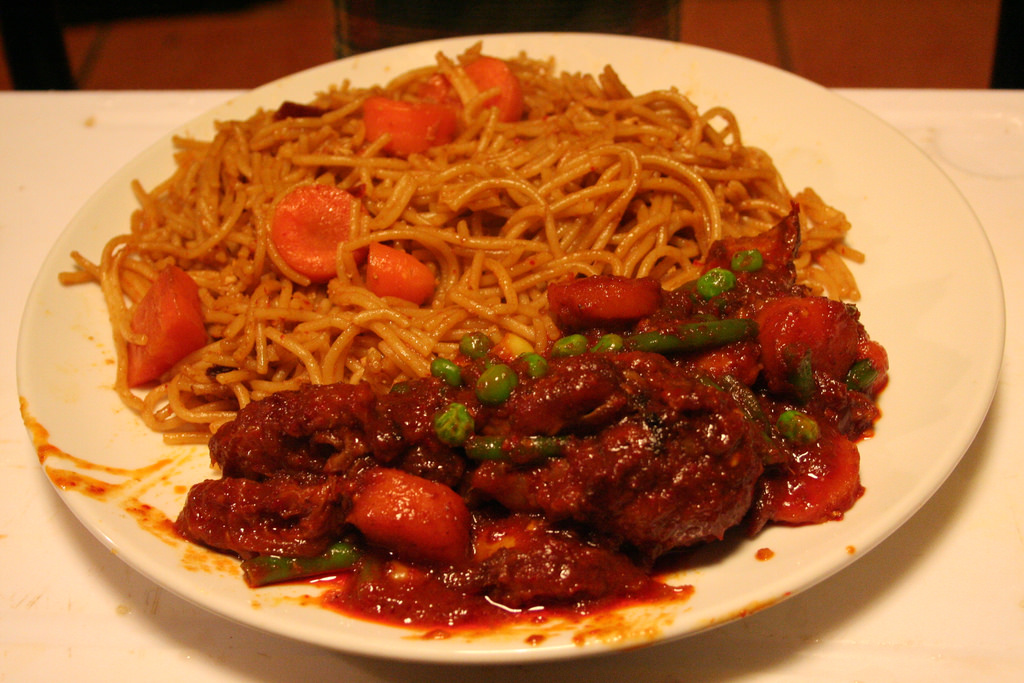
Ayam masak merah

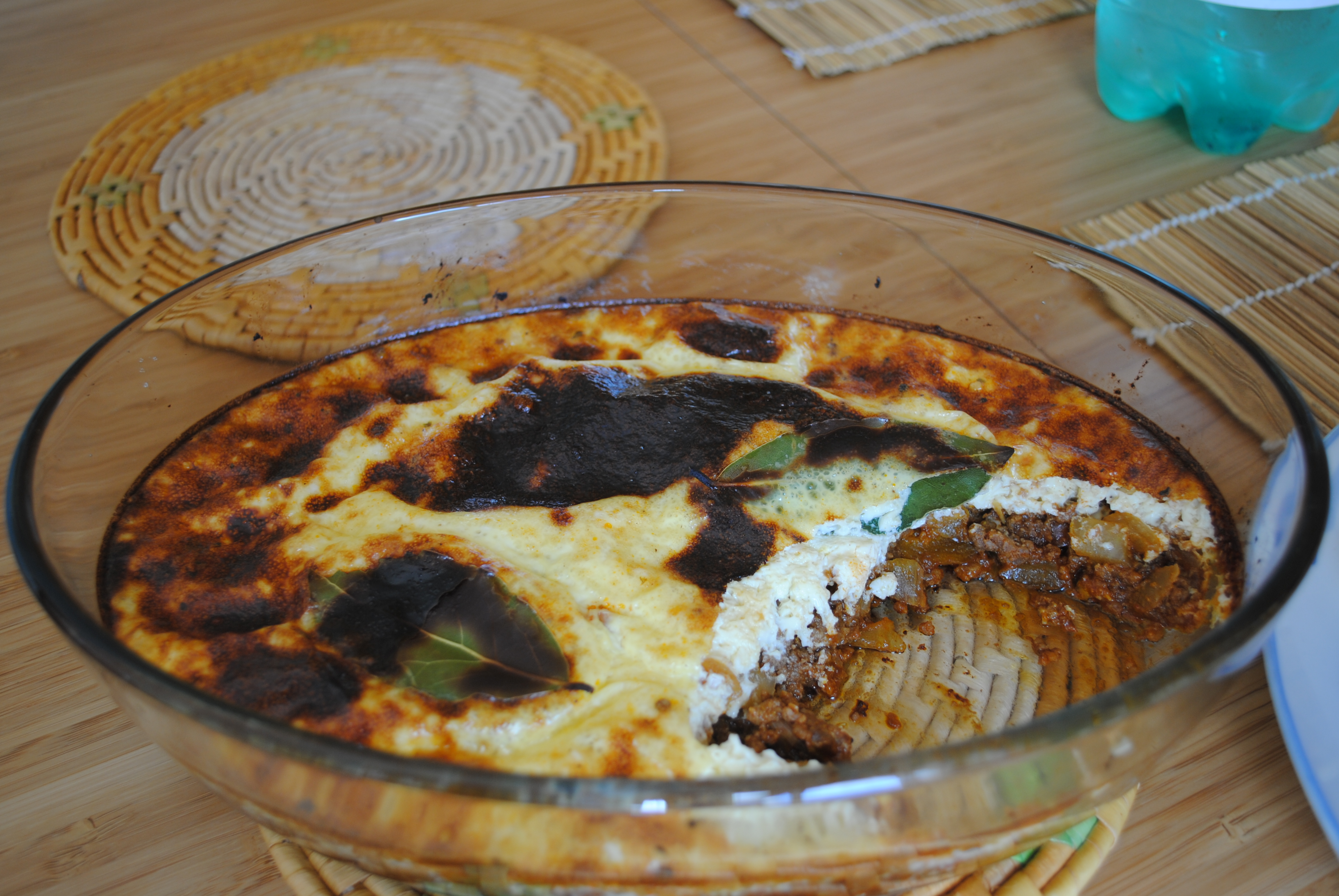
Bobotie

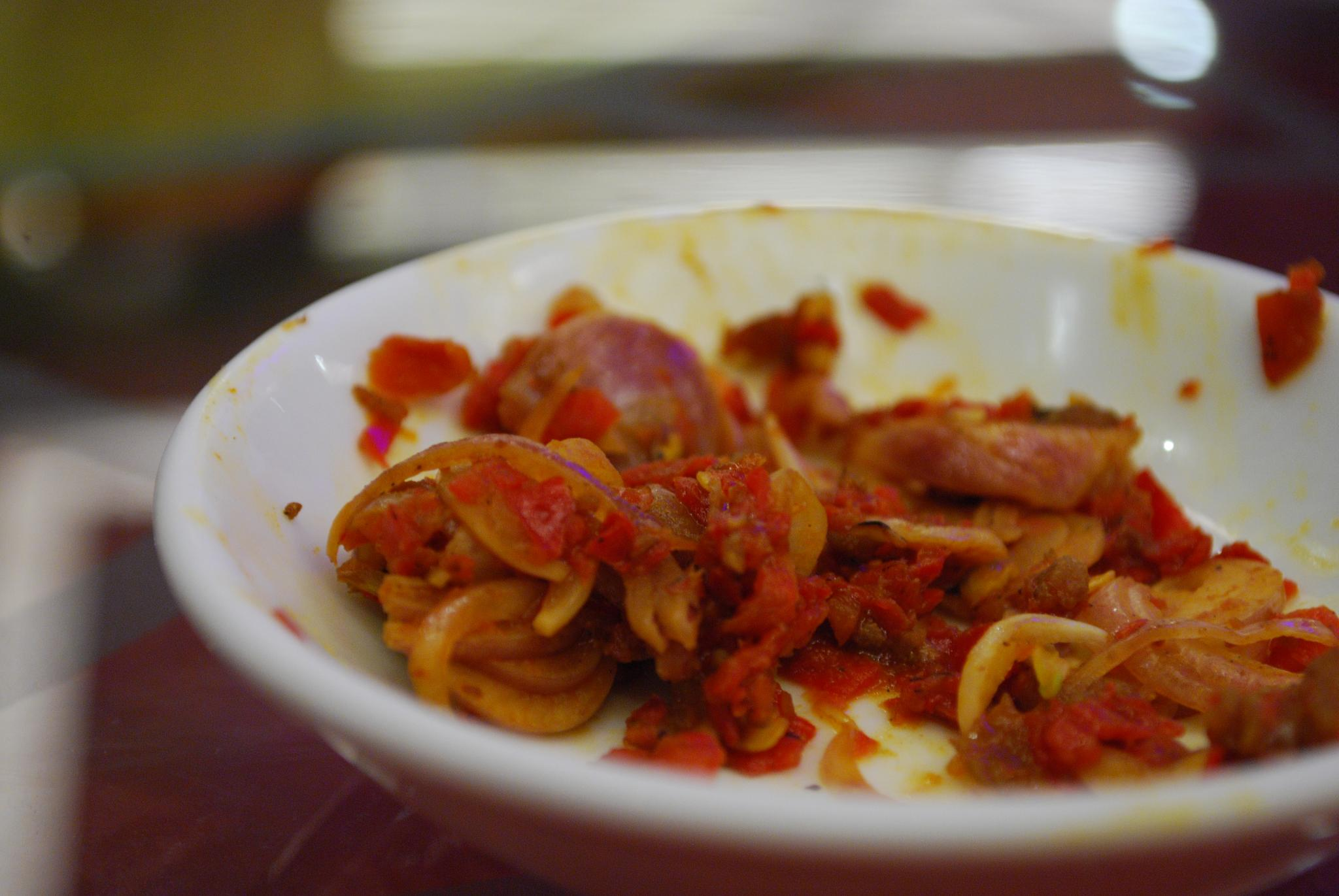
Cincalok

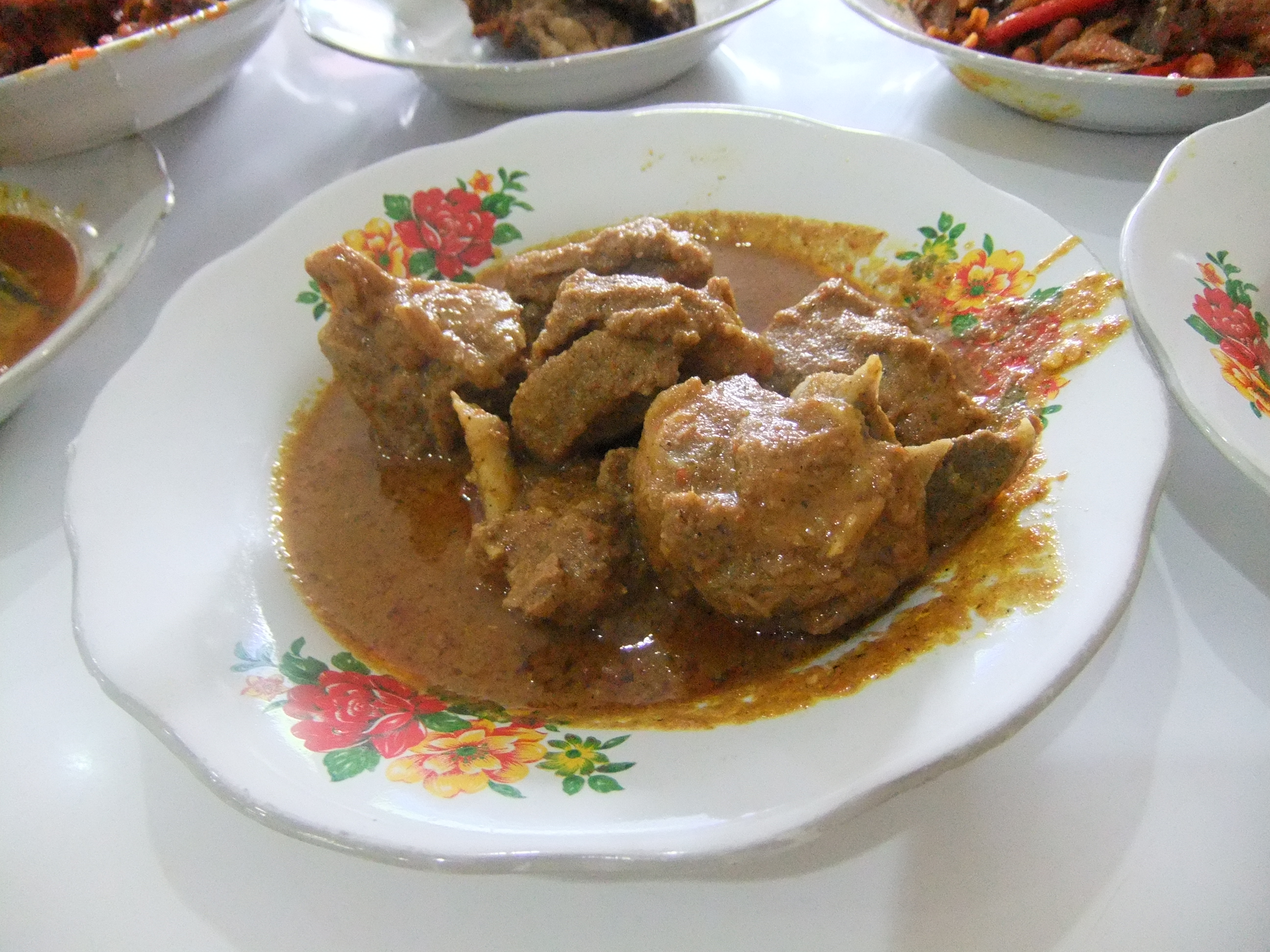
Gulai

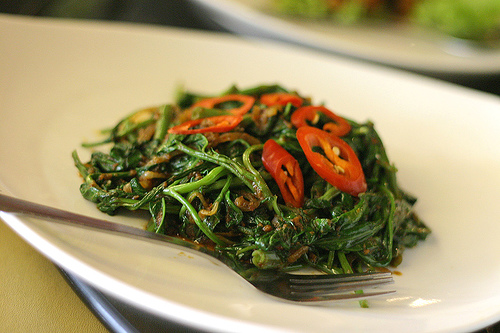
Kangkung belacan

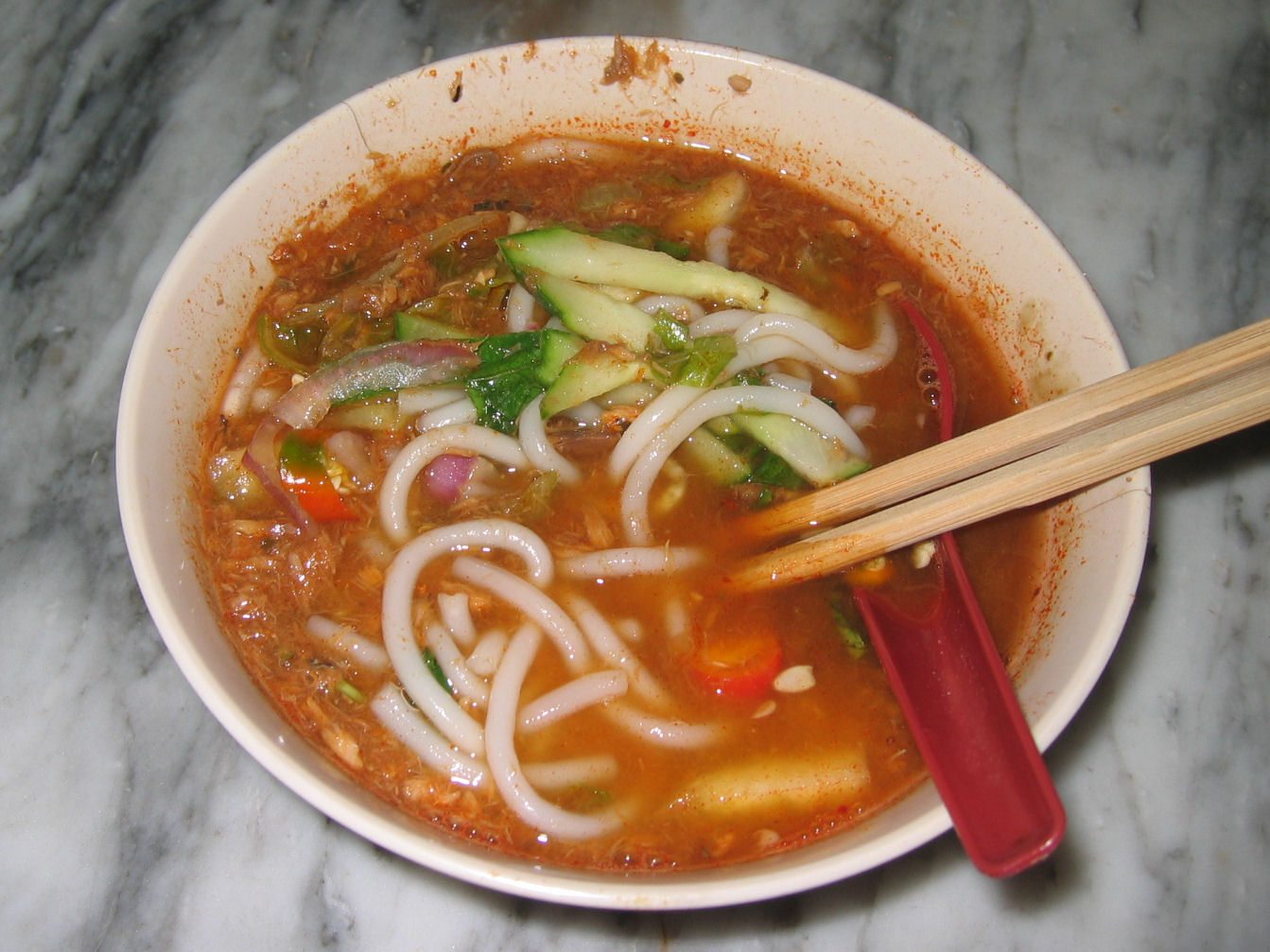
Laksa asam

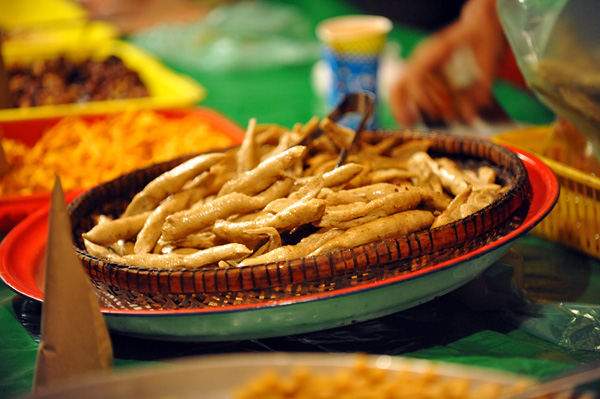
Lekor

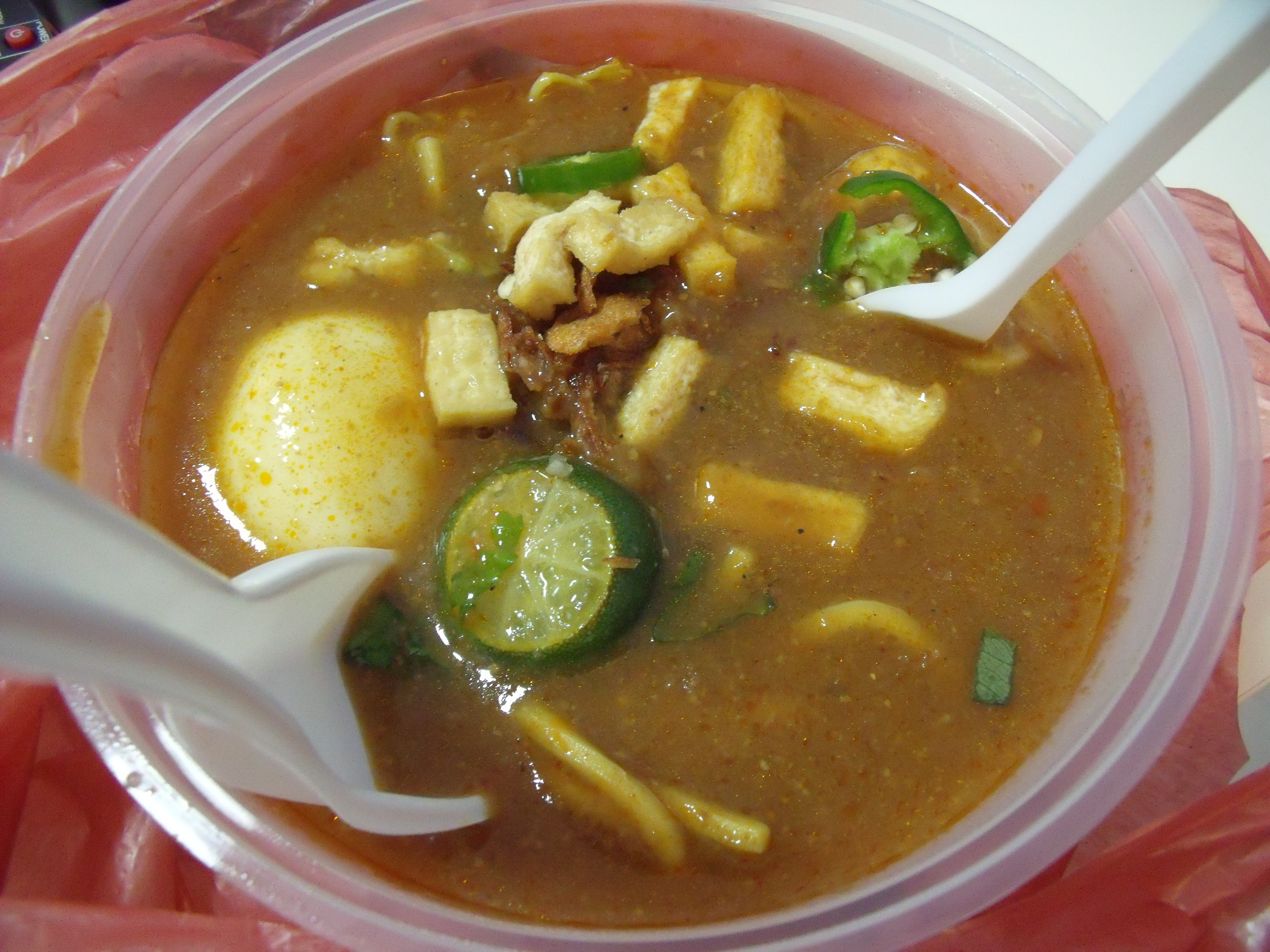
Mi rebus

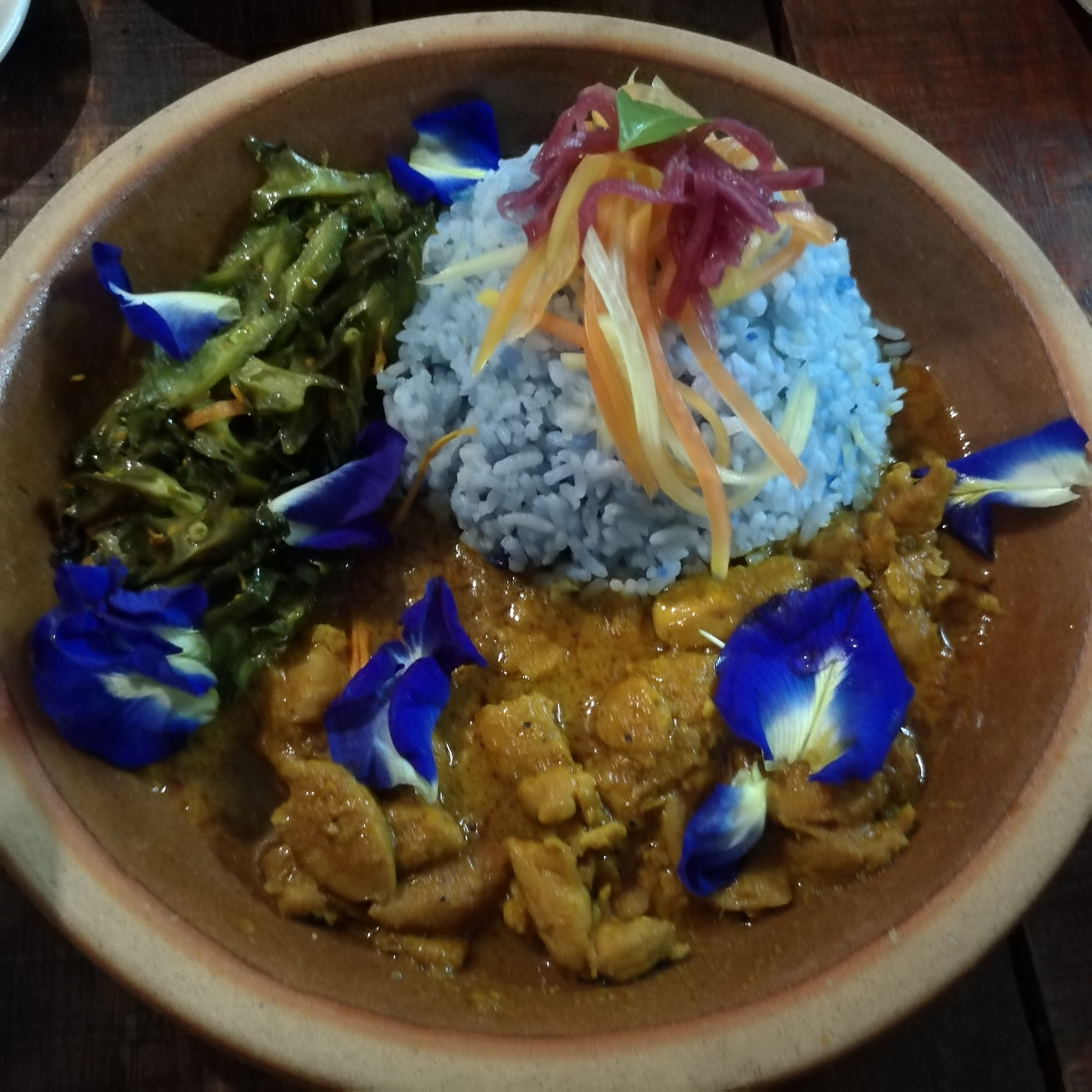
Nasi kerabu

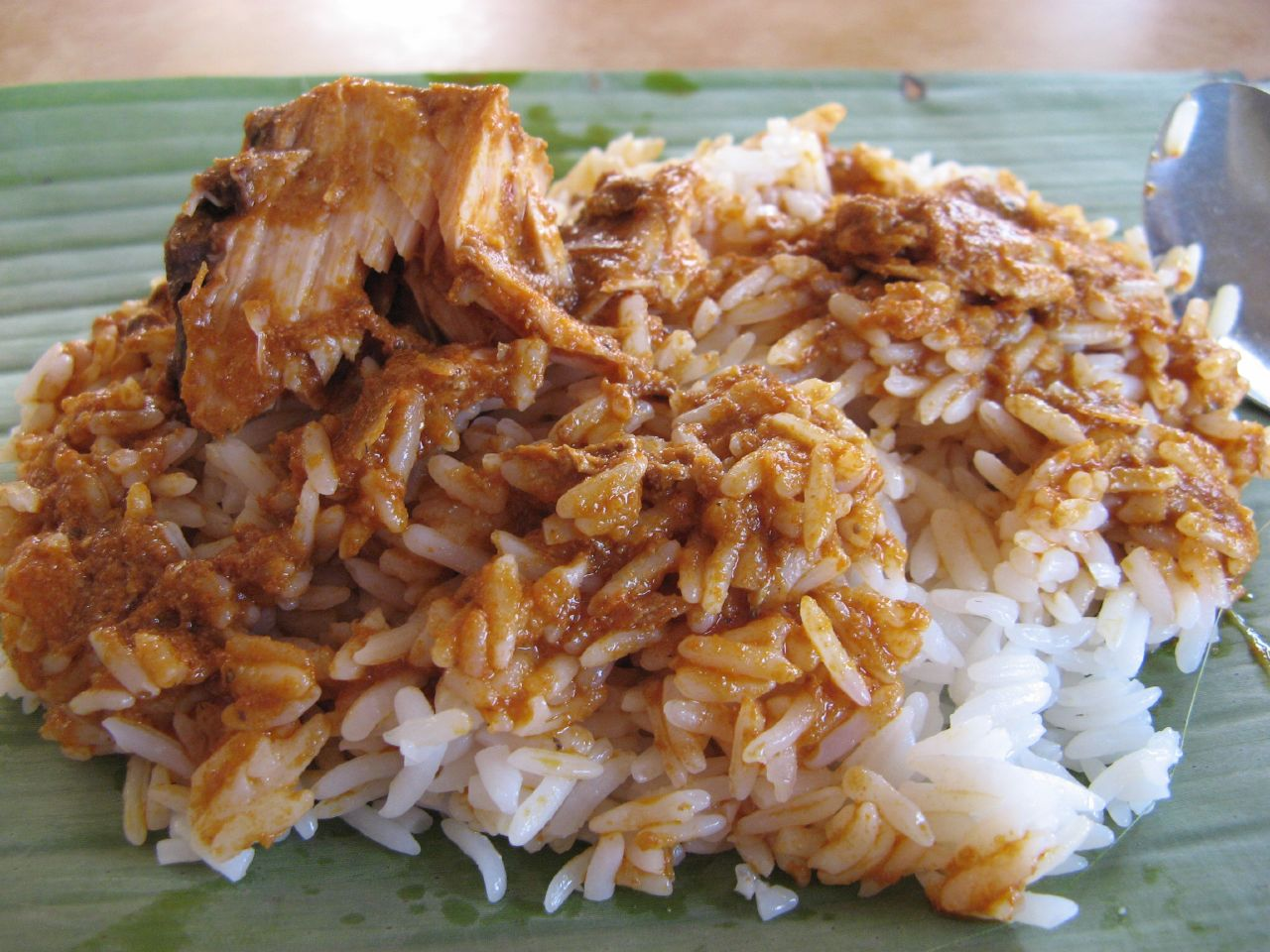
Nasi dagang

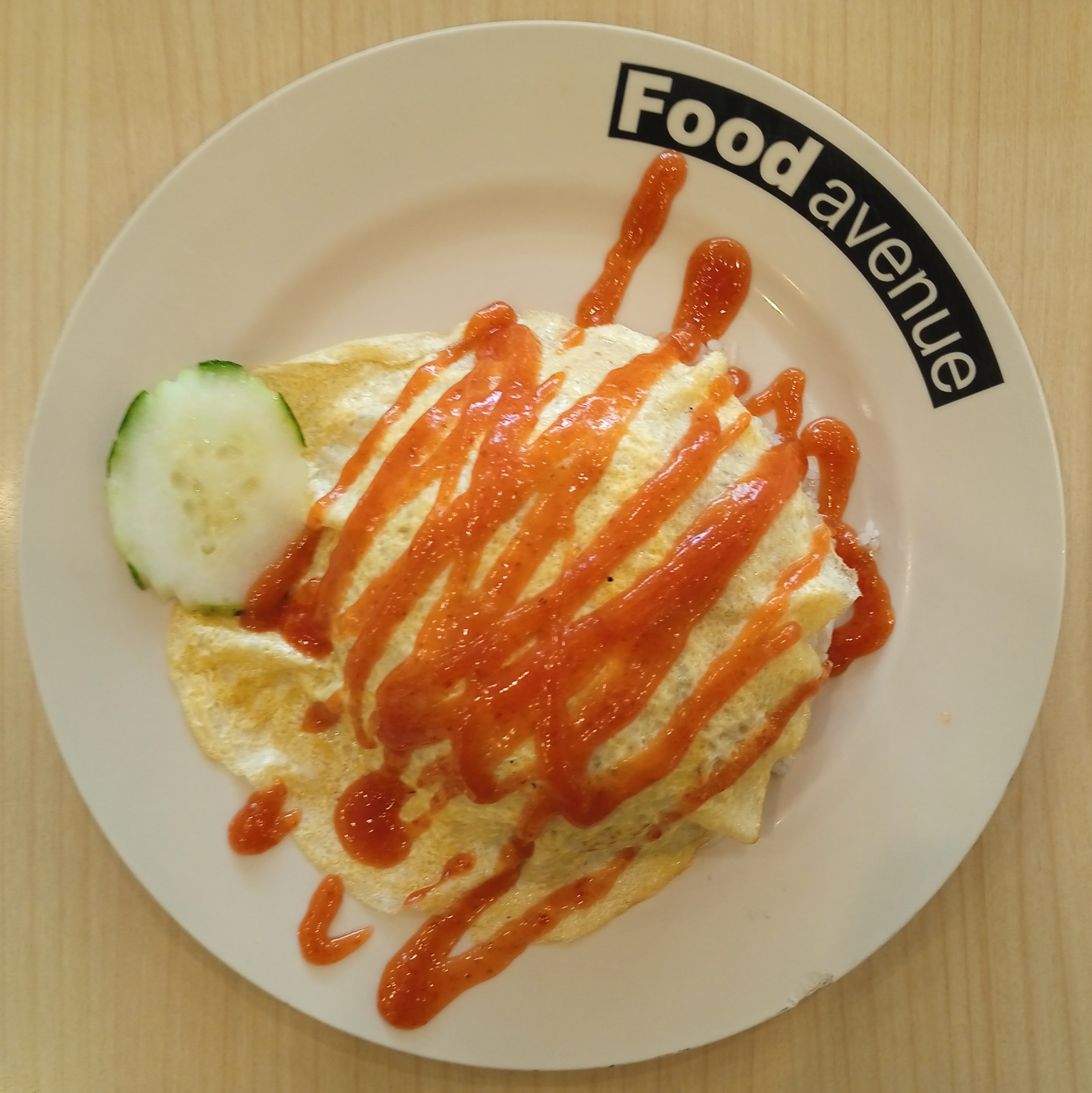
Nasi goreng pattaya

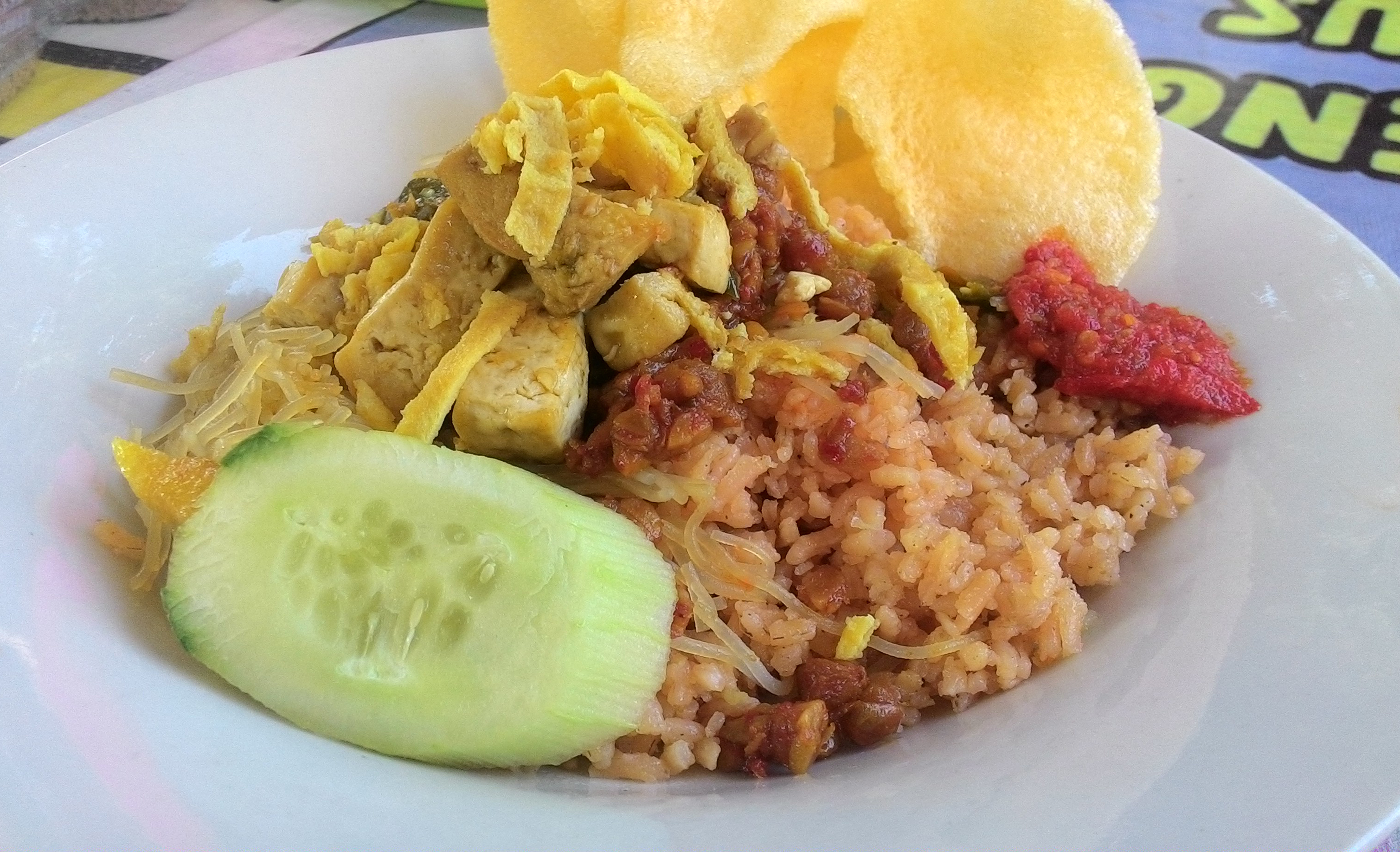
Nasi minyak

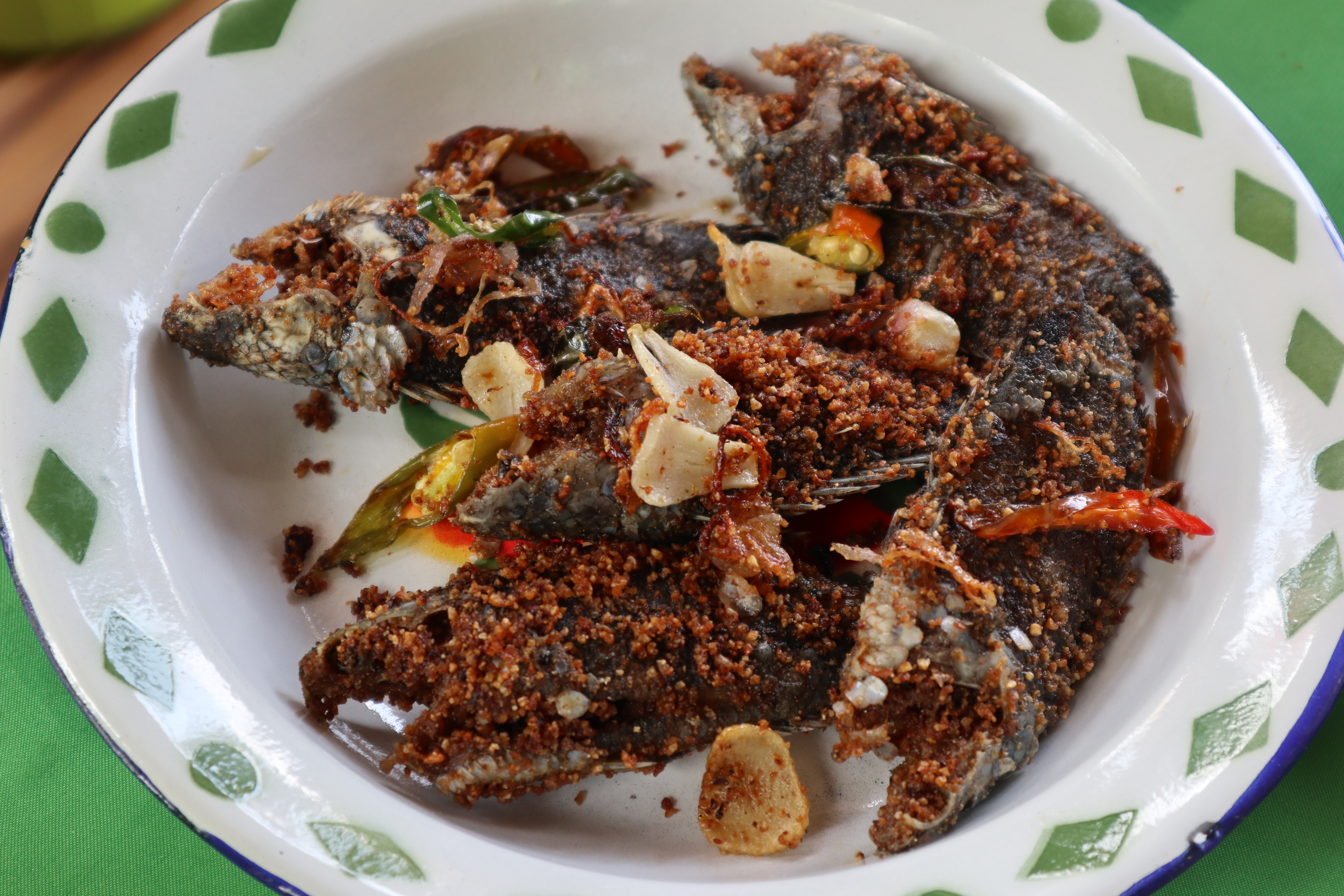
Pekasam

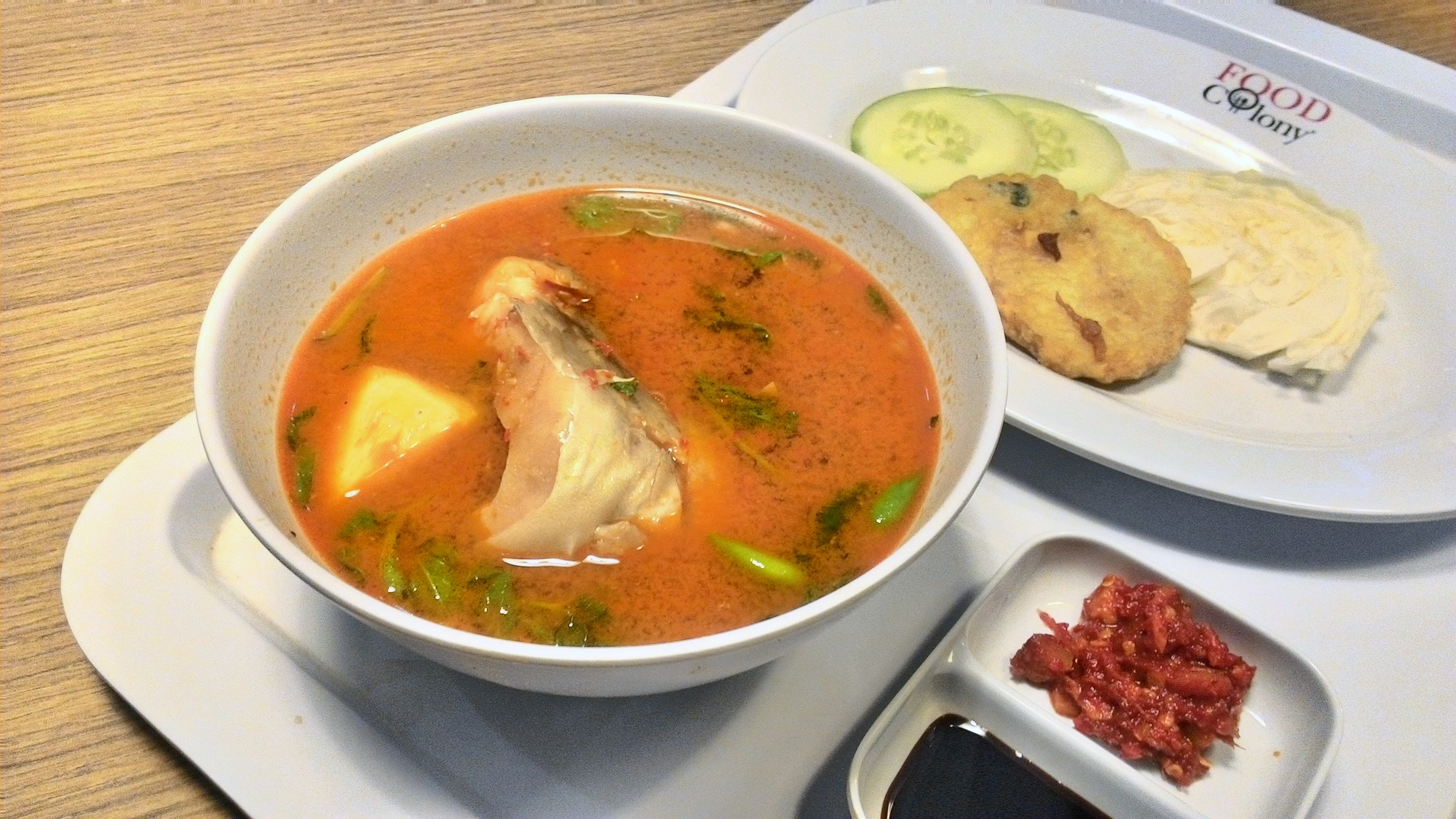
Pindang

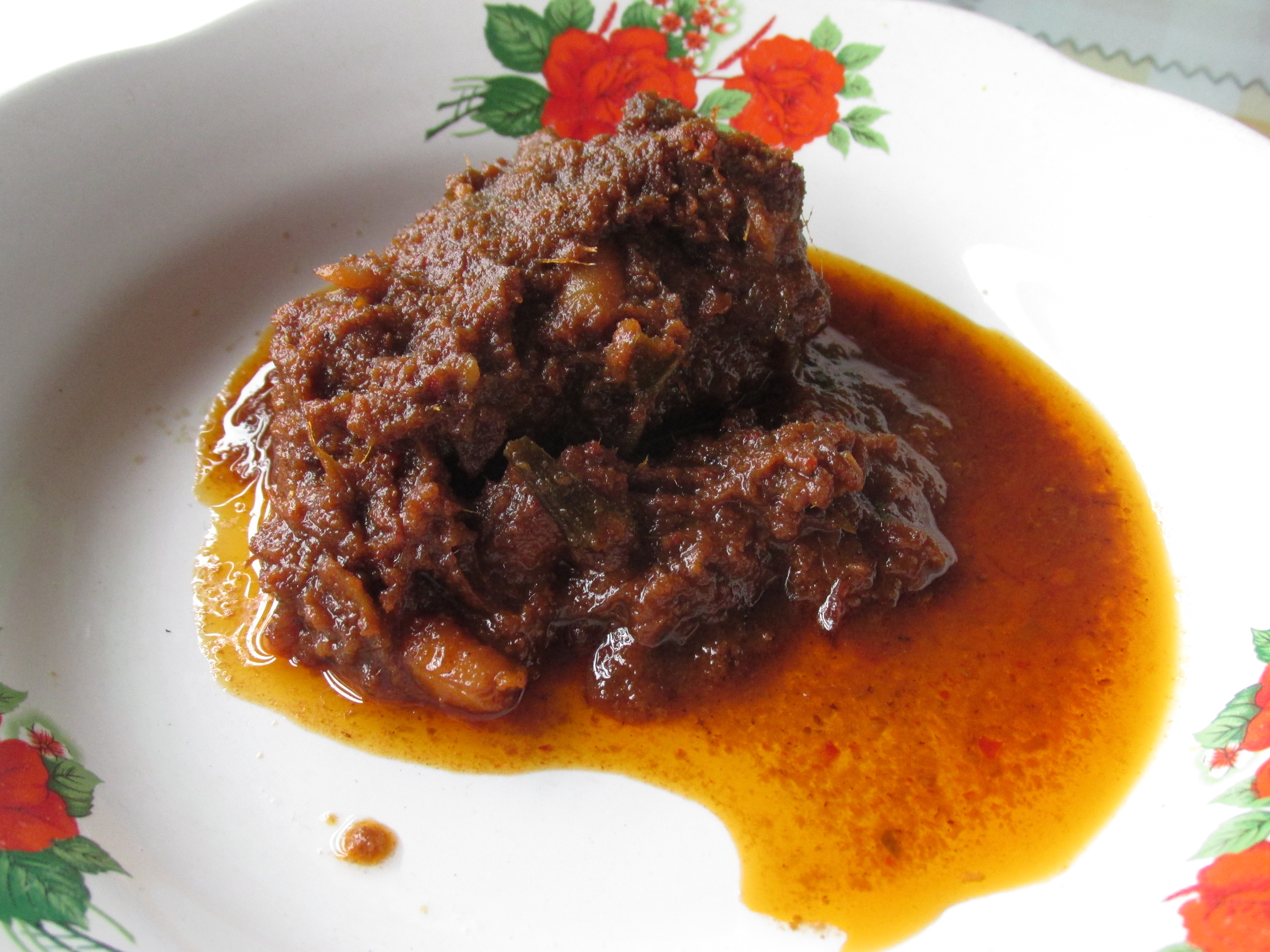
Rendang

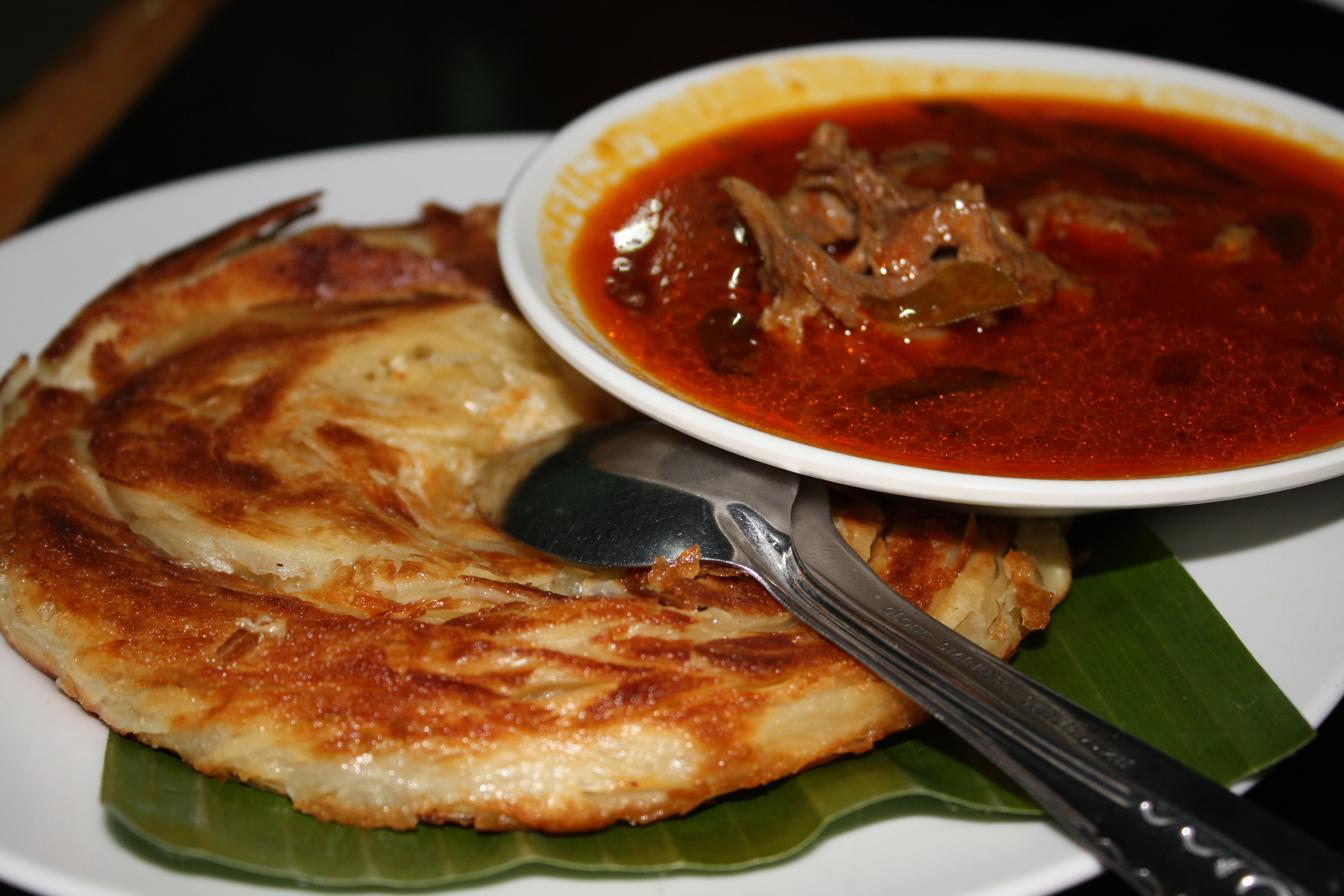
Roti canai

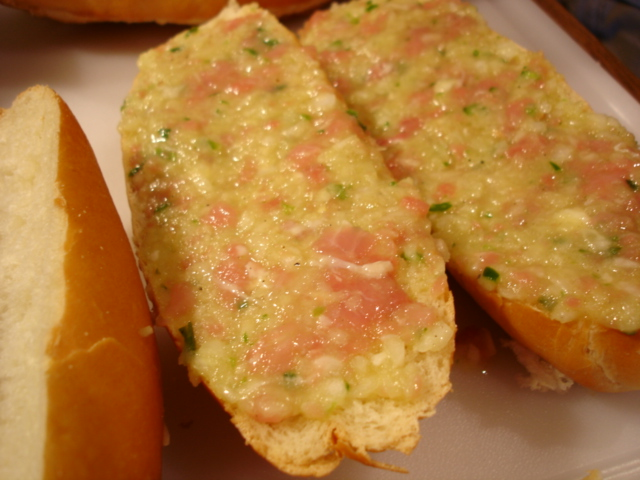
Roti john

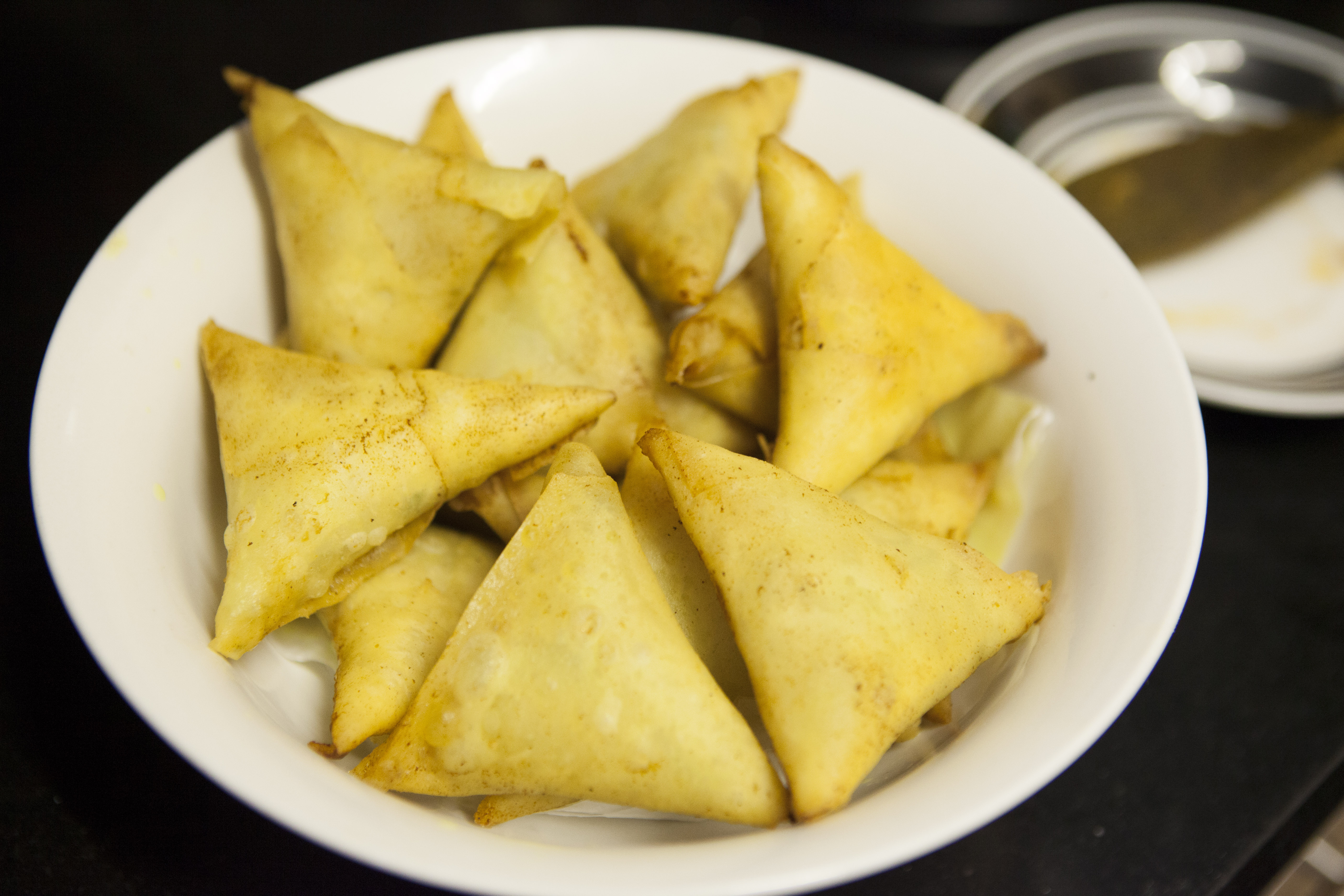
Samosa

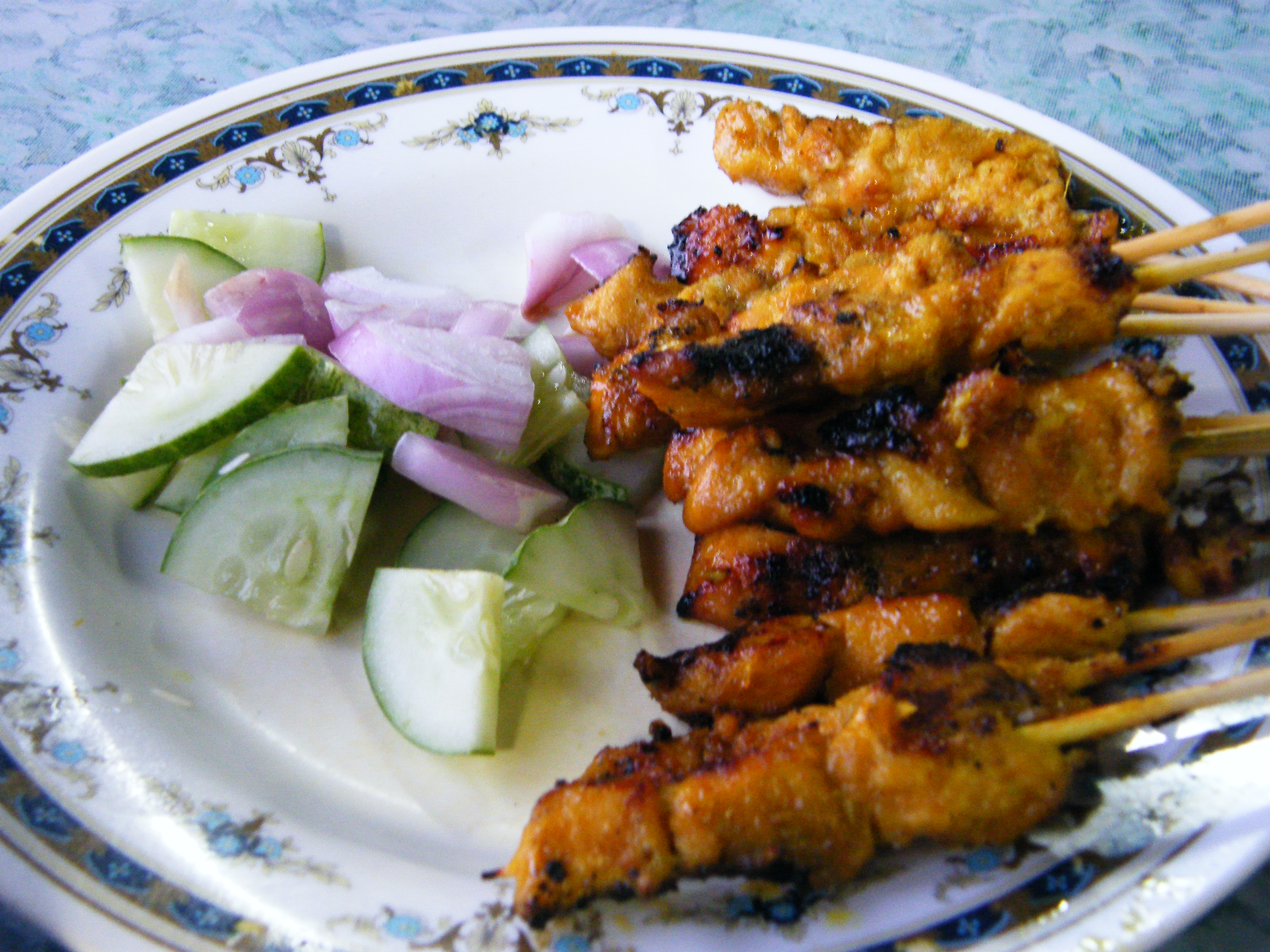
Satay

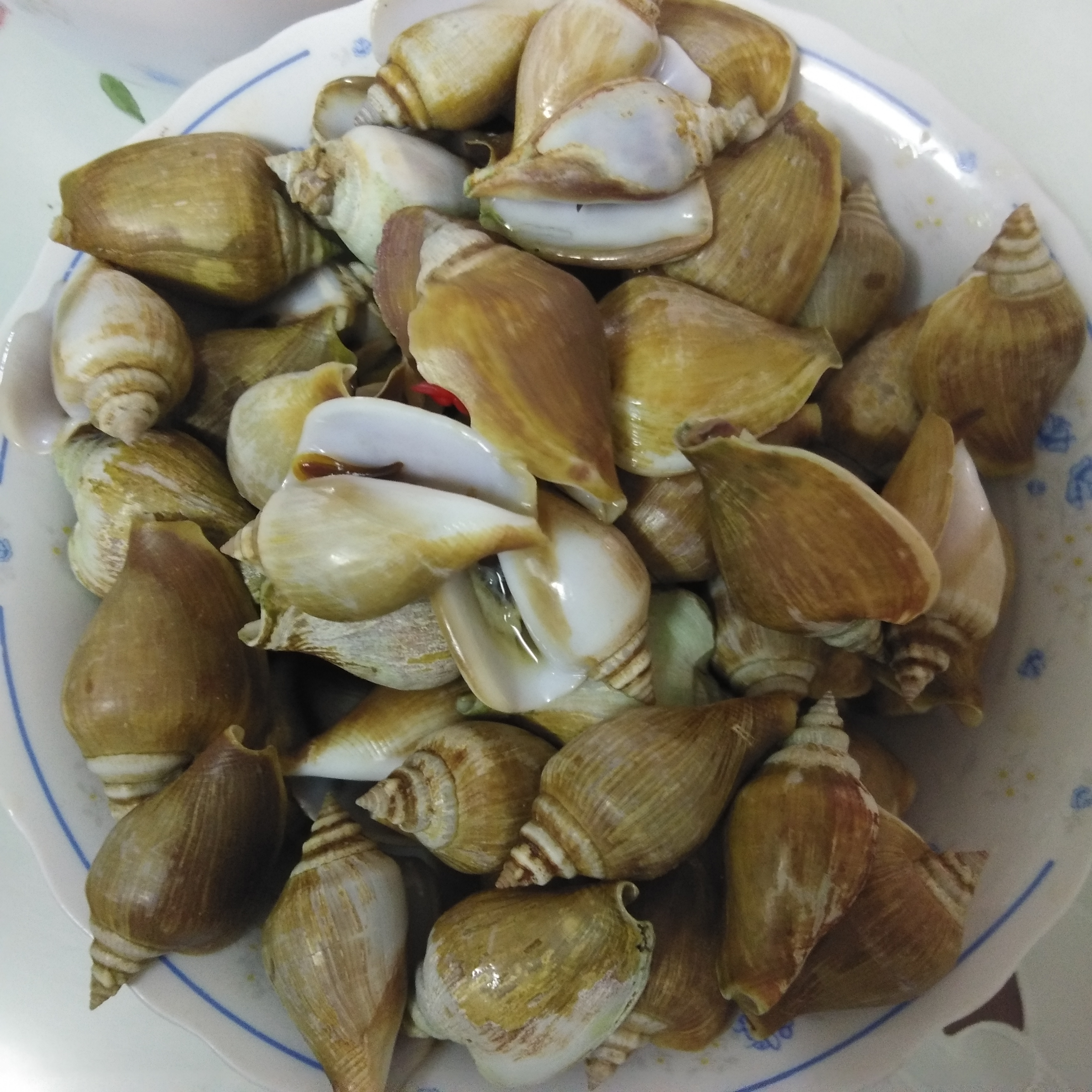
Siput gonggong

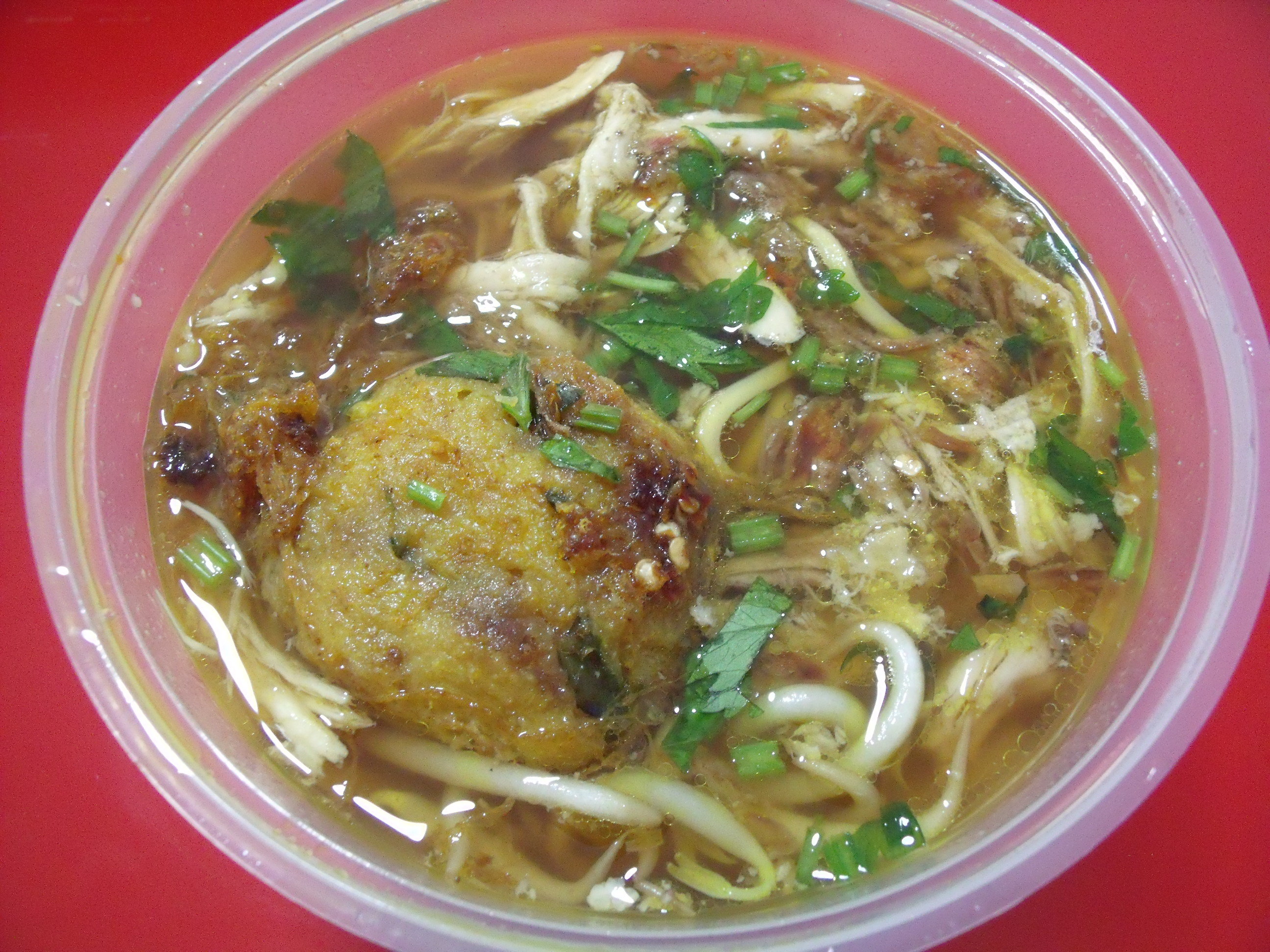
Soto mi

=== Dishes ===
- Acar, pickled vegetables or fruits with dried chilli, peanuts, and spices
- Ambuyat, a dish derived from the interior trunk of the sago palm. It is a starchy bland substance, similar to tapioca starch. It is the national dish of Brunei.
- Amplang, a cracker made from Spanish mackerel, tapioca starch and other seasonings, and then deep fried.
- Apam johol, a sweetened rice cake, wrapped in rambai leaves to preserve the aroma and make it look good. It is sometimes eaten with rendang, sambal tumis and bean porridge.
- Arisa, a boiled, cracked, or coarsely-ground wheat, mixed with meat and seasoned. Its consistency varies between a porridge and a dumpling.
- Asam pedas, a sour stew of fish (usually mackerel), tamarind, chilli, tomatoes, okra and Vietnamese coriander.
- Ayam golek or ayam percik, grilled chicken with spicy sauce.
- Ayam goreng, a generic term for deep-fried chicken, typically marinated in a base of seasonings prior to cooking.
  - Ayam goreng kunyit, deep-fried chicken, marinated in a base of turmeric and other seasonings.
- Ayam masak merah, a casserole of chicken pieces in dried chilli sambal. It tends to be a home-cooked dish, so many variations on the recipe exist.
- Ayam pansuh, a dish prepared by cooking chicken in a bamboo stalk, filled with water (which will later be the soup), seasonings and covered with tapioca leaves from the cassava plant.
- Begedil, spherical fritters made from mashed potato and occasionally ground meat.
- Bihun belacan, rice vermicelli dressed in a gravy made from ground chillies, belacan, tamarind, and dried shrimp. It is garnished with cured cuttlefish, julienned cucumber, bean sprouts and century egg wedges.
- Bihun goreng, stir-fried rice vermicelli.
- Bihun kari, rice vermicelli mixed with curry, served with mung bean sprout, fried tofu and red chilli sambal.
- Bobotie, Cape Malay dish consisting of spiced minced meat baked with an egg-based topping.
- Bubur cha cha, breakfast dish prepared using pearled sago, sweet potatoes, yams, bananas, coconut milk, pandan leaves, sugar and salt.
- Bubur lambuk, a savoury rice porridge consumed during the fasting month of Ramadhan, made with a mixture of lemongrass, spices, vegetables, and chicken or beef. It is usually cooked communally at a local mosque, which is then distributed to the congregation as a meal to break the fast every evening.
- Bubur pedas, a traditional porridge made from finely-ground sauteed rice and grated coconut, a specialty of West Kalimantan.
- Cincalok, fermented small shrimp or krill. It is usually served as a condiment together with chillies, shallots and lime juice.
- Dalca, a stewed vegetable curry with lentils.
- Dendeng, a thinly sliced dried meat.
- Frikkadel, Cape Malay dish comprising usually baked, but sometimes deep-fried, meatballs prepared with onion, bread, eggs, vinegar and spices.
- Gulai, a type of soupy curry-like dishes made from various ingredients: meats, fish or vegetables. This dish originates from Minangkabau.
  - Gulai ayam, chicken gulai.
  - Gulai kambing, goat or mutton gulai.
  - Gulai ketam, crab gulai, a speciality of the Deli Malays of Medan, North Sumatra.
- Ikan bakar, grilled/barbecued fish with either chilli, kunyit (turmeric) or other spice-based sauce.
  - Ikan mas panggang, barbecued common carp dish, a specialty of Jambi.
  - Ikan pari bakar, barbecued stingray dish.
- Ikan patin, large catfish cooked in various ways such as gulai and asam pedas, a speciality of Riau, Sumatra and Pahang.
- Kacang pool, a stew of cooked broad beans served with vegetable oil, cumin, and optionally with chopped parsley, garlic, onion, lemon juice, chilli pepper and other vegetable, herb and spice ingredients.
- Kangkung belacan, water spinach wok-fried in shrimp paste (belacan) and hot chilli peppers. Various other items are cooked this way, including petai (which is quite bitter when eaten raw) and yardlong beans.
- Kari, the Malay adaptation of curry dishes. Just like gulai, it can be made from various meats or vegetables. A popular style is kari ayam (chicken curry).
  - Kari ayam, chicken curry.
  - Kari kambing, goat curry.
  - Kari kepala ikan, fish head curry.
- Kebebe, food made of thirteen ingredients with a bitter, salty, sweet, sour and spicy taste. It is allegedly able to cure indigestion after a large meal.
- Kemplang, traditional savoury fish cracker commonly found in southern parts of Sumatra, made of wahoo or Spanish mackerel.
- Kerabu, a type of salad-like dish which can be made with any combination of cooked or uncooked fruits and vegetables, as well as the occasional meat or seafood ingredient. There are many kerabu recipes; a popular style is kerabu taugeh.
- Kerutuk daging, a type of coconut milk-based curry. Traditionally it is eaten with white rice, sambal belacan and ulam.
- Ketupat, a type of glutinous rice dumpling wrapped in a woven palm leaf pouch and boiled. As the rice cooks, the grains expand to fill the pouch and the rice becomes compressed. This method of cooking gives the ketupat its characteristic form and texture. Usually eaten with rendang (a type of dry beef curry) or served as an accompaniment to satay or gado-gado. Ketupat is also traditionally served at open houses on festive occasions such as Eid al-Fitr.
- Kuning, rice dish cooked with turmeric, lemongrass, salt, bay leaves, and other spices to taste.
- Kurma, chicken or mutton braised with a medley of ground spices, nuts, and coconut milk or grated coconut.
- Kuzi ayam, a thick curry. Traditionally it is eaten with white rice, sambal belacan and ulam.
- Kwetiau goreng, a stir-fried flat rice noodle dish from Indonesia. The Malay version is without pork.
- Laksa, a spicy noodle soup that consists of thick wheat noodles or rice vermicelli with chicken, prawn or fish, served in spicy soup based on either rich and spicy curry coconut milk or sour asam (tamarind or gelugur) of various types.
  - Laksa asam, sour, fish and tamarind-based soup of laksa.
  - Laksa kari, coconut-based curry soup of laksa.
- Lakso, noodle dish served in savoury yellowish coconut milk-based soup, flavoured with fish, and sprinkled with fried shallots.
- Lekor, a speciality of the state of Terengganu and other states on the east coast of the Malaysian Peninsula. It is a savoury cake made from a combination of batter and shredded fish. Sliced and fried just before serving, it is eaten with hot sauce.
- Lemang, glutinous rice and coconut milk cooked in a hollowed bamboo stick lined with banana leaves.
- Lepat, a sticky rice dumpling mixed with peanuts cooked with coconut milk and packed inside a young coconut leaf or palm leaf.
- Lontong, compressed rice cake in the form of a cylinder wrapped inside a banana leaf.
- Masak lemak, a style of cooking which employs liberal amounts of turmeric-seasoned coconut milk.
- Mi bandung, a famous noodle dish cooked with dried shrimp and blended chilli. Often served with half-boiled egg.
- Mi celor, a noodle soup served in a coconut milk and shrimp-based broth, specialty of Palembang, South Sumatra.
- Mi goreng, spicy stir-fried noodle dish, originating from Indonesia
  - Maggi goreng, a variant of mi goreng using Maggi instant noodles.
- Mi jawa, noodle dish made up of yellow egg noodles drenched in a blended sweet potato base with tomato sauce and prawn stock.
- Mi kari, thin yellow noodles or rice vermicelli with spicy curry soup, sambal, coconut milk, spices and a choice of toppings.
- Mi kolo, light and tossed noodles in a transparent sauce.
- Mi rebus, a famous noodle dish which consisting of mee (noodle, salt and egg) served with a tangy, spicy, sweet potato-based sauce. It is sometimes also called mee jawa, perhaps as a nod to its Javanese origins.
- Mi siam, noodle dish of fried rice vermicelli with spicy gravy.
- Mi wantan, thin egg noodles with wonton dumplings.
- Murtabak, a stuffed pancake or pan-fried bread eaten with curry gravy, commonly found in Indonesia and Peninsular Malaysia.
- Nasi ambeng, a fragrant rice dish that consists of steamed white rice, chicken curry or chicken stewed in soy sauce, beef or chicken rendang, sambal goreng, urap, perkedel and serundeng.
- Nasi beringin, a fragrant rice dish that used to be served to Johor royalties in the late 1890s.
- Nasi briyani, Malay style of flavoured rice dish cooked or served with mutton, chicken, vegetable or fish curry.
  - Beriani gam, a flavoured rice dish usually served with chicken or mutton; a specialty of Johor.
- Nasi berlauk, plain rice served with a variety of dishes.
- Nasi dagang, the east coastal counterpart of nasi lemak found mostly in the states of Terengganu and Kelantan, as well as Riau province in Indonesia.
- Nasi goreng, a fried rice dish with various types.
  - Nasi goreng kampung, a typical variant, traditionally flavoured with pounded fried fish (normally mackerel), though recently fried anchovies are used instead.
  - Nasi goreng kari, fried rice cooked with curry.
  - Nasi goreng masak pedas, spicy fried rice served with chicken or beef.
  - Nasi goreng pattaya, chicken fried rice covered or wrapped in a thin fried egg or omelette.
  - Nasi goreng teri medan, anchovy fried rice. This dish is a Malay Deli speciality of North Sumatra.
- Nasi kari, curry rice dish with Indonesian origin.
- Nasi katok, rice dish consisting of plain rice, fried chicken and sambal.
- Nasi kerabu, a type of rice which is blue in colour (dyed by Clitoria ternatea flowers), originating from Kelantan.
- Nasi lemak, rice steamed with coconut milk.
- Nasi lemuni, like nasi lemak but cooked with Vitex trifolia leaves.
- Nasi minyak, rice flavoured with whole dried spices and ghee, usually served with rendang. As the name implies, it is buttery and rich (minyak means oil). A variation dyed in multiple shades is called nasi hujan panas.
- Nasi padang, steamed white rice served with an array—sometimes twelve or more–of pre-cooked dishes, a miniature banquet usually laid out on small plates.
- Nasi paprik, a rice dish with lauk, typically chicken, originating from southern Thailand.
- Nasi tumpang, rice packed in a cone-shaped banana leaf. It consists of an omelette, meat floss, chicken or shrimp curry and sweet gravy. The dish originates from Kelantan.
- Nasi ulam, a steamed rice dish mixed with various herbs, especially the leaves of Centella asiatica or often replaced with kemangi, vegetables, and spices and accompanied with various side dishes.
- Otak-otak, a spicy fish cake grilled in a banana leaf wrapping.
- Pekasam, the Malay term for fermented food. In Malay cookery, pekasam usually refers to freshwater fish fermented with salt, palm sugar, toasted rice grains and pieces of asam gelugur. Making pekasam is a tradition in South Kalimantan as well as the northern states of Peninsular Malaysia. Chenderoh Lake in the state of Perak is a hub for freshwater fishing as well as the production of pekasam.
- Pasembur, a salad of shredded cucumber, boiled potatoes, fried bean curd, turnip, bean sprouts, prawn fritters, spicy fried crab, and fried octopus.
- Pempek, a savoury fishcake, made of fish and tapioca, from Palembang, South Sumatra.
- Perut ikan, a spicy stew comprising mainly vegetables and herbs which gets its distinctive taste mainly from fish bellies preserved in brine and Piper sarmentosum.
- Pindang, fish or eggs cooked in salt and certain spices.
- Pulut, glutinous rice, is a type of short-grained Asian rice that is especially sticky when cooked. It is widely eaten during the Raya festive seasons as traditional food.
- Rendang, a spicy meat stew originating from the Minangkabau ethnic group of Indonesia, and adopted by Malay throughout the archipelago. Rendang is traditionally prepared by the Malay community during festive occasions.
- Rojak, a traditional fruit and vegetable salad of various types which shows Javanese influences.
  - Rojak bandung, a rojak dish consisting of boiled water spinach, cucumber, and cuttlefish, dressed with a black shrimp paste sauce with added garlic and chilli paste.
- Roti, a term encompassing all forms of bread in the Malay and Indonesian languages. In Cape Malay cuisine, roti is a round flatbread usually made from wheat flour.
- Roti canai, a thin unleavened bread with a flaky crust, fried on a skillet with oil and served with condiments or curry.
  - Roti prata, Singaporean Malay fried flatbread cooked over a flat grilling pan.
- Roti jala, a special bread with a five-hole perforation used to make the bread look like a fishing net. It is usually eaten as an accompaniment to a curried dish or served as a sweet with serawa. Serawa is made from a mixture of boiled coconut milk, brown sugar and pandan leaves.
- Roti john, a spiced meat omelette sandwich, popularly eaten for breakfast or as a snack.
- Roti kaya bakar, a traditional breakfast dish. Kaya is a sweet coconut and egg jam which is spread over toasted bread.
- Roti tissue, a variant of roti canai made as thin as a piece of tissue paper and 40–50 cm (16–20 in) in diameter. It is then carefully folded by the cook into a tall, conical shape and left to stand upright. Roti tissue may be served with curry gravy, dal and chutneys, or finished off with sweet ingredients such as caramelised sugar and eaten as a dessert.
- Samosa or samoosa, a Malay style of samosa—a fried or baked pastry with a savoury filling, such as spiced potatoes, onions, rousong, cheese, beef or other meats.
- Sata, a traditional dish from Terengganu, consisting of spiced fish wrapped in banana leaves and cooked on a grill.
- Satay, a dish originally from Java and Sumatra in Indonesia, and distributed widely across the Malay Archipelago. It is widely popular and common in Indonesian cuisine with rich variations and recipes. Malay chicken satay closely resembles Madura satay with a rich peanut sauce. In Malaysia, the most popular variant is kajang satay.
- Satay celup, a dish in which an assortment of raw and semi-cooked seafood, meats (including raw meat) and vegetables on skewers are dunked into a boiling pot of satay gravy.
- Sayur lodeh, a stew of vegetables cooked in a lightly spiced coconut milk gravy. It has Javanese influences and is mostly popular in the southern region of Malaysia.
- Siput gonggong, a seafood dish made of Laevistrombus canarium, a specialty of the Riau Islands and Bangka Belitung.
- Sosatie, a traditional Cape Malay dish of meat (usually lamb or mutton) cooked on skewers. The term derives from sate (skewered meat) and saus (spicy sauce).
- Soto, a noodle soup. The most popular variety is soto ayam, chicken soup with rice vermicelli and ketupat, with influences from Indonesian cuisine.
  - Soto mi, a spicy noodle soup dish with soto gravy.
- Sup ikan, a fish soup specialty of the Riau Islands usually made of red snapper and dried shrimp, seasoned with shallot, garlic, pepper, soy sauce, and fish sauce, with tomato, scallion and fried shallots.
- Sup kambing, a hearty mutton soup slowly simmered with aromatic herbs and spices and garnished with fried shallots and fresh cilantro.
- Sup rusa, a soup dish made of venison, carrots, cabbage, celery and spices.
- Sup tulang, a soup dish made of mutton or beef leg bones stewed in spices. The bones are broken to allow the marrow to be eaten.
- Tahu goreng, fried bean curd served with condiments, such as sambals or sweet sauce.
- Taugeh ayam, steamed chicken with bean sprouts and light soya sauce flavoured with oil.
- Tekwan, surimi fishcake akin to pempek, bihun rice noodles, jicama and mushroom soup.
- Telur pindang, marbled eggs boiled with herbs and spices.
- Tharid, a lamb stew of pieces of bread in a vegetable and lamb broth.
- Tomato bredie, mutton stew cooked for a long time; its seasonings include cinnamon, cardamom, ginger and cloves as well as chilli.
- Tumis kangkung, stir-fried water spinach.
- Ulam, a traditional salad of undressed herbs, greens and vegetables which may be cooked or uncooked. An ulam spread may include items such as banana blossoms, cucumber, winged beans, pegaga leaves, petai, and yardlong beans. Ulam is typically eaten with a pungent dipping sauce like sambal belacan.

=== Condiments ===
Malay condiments

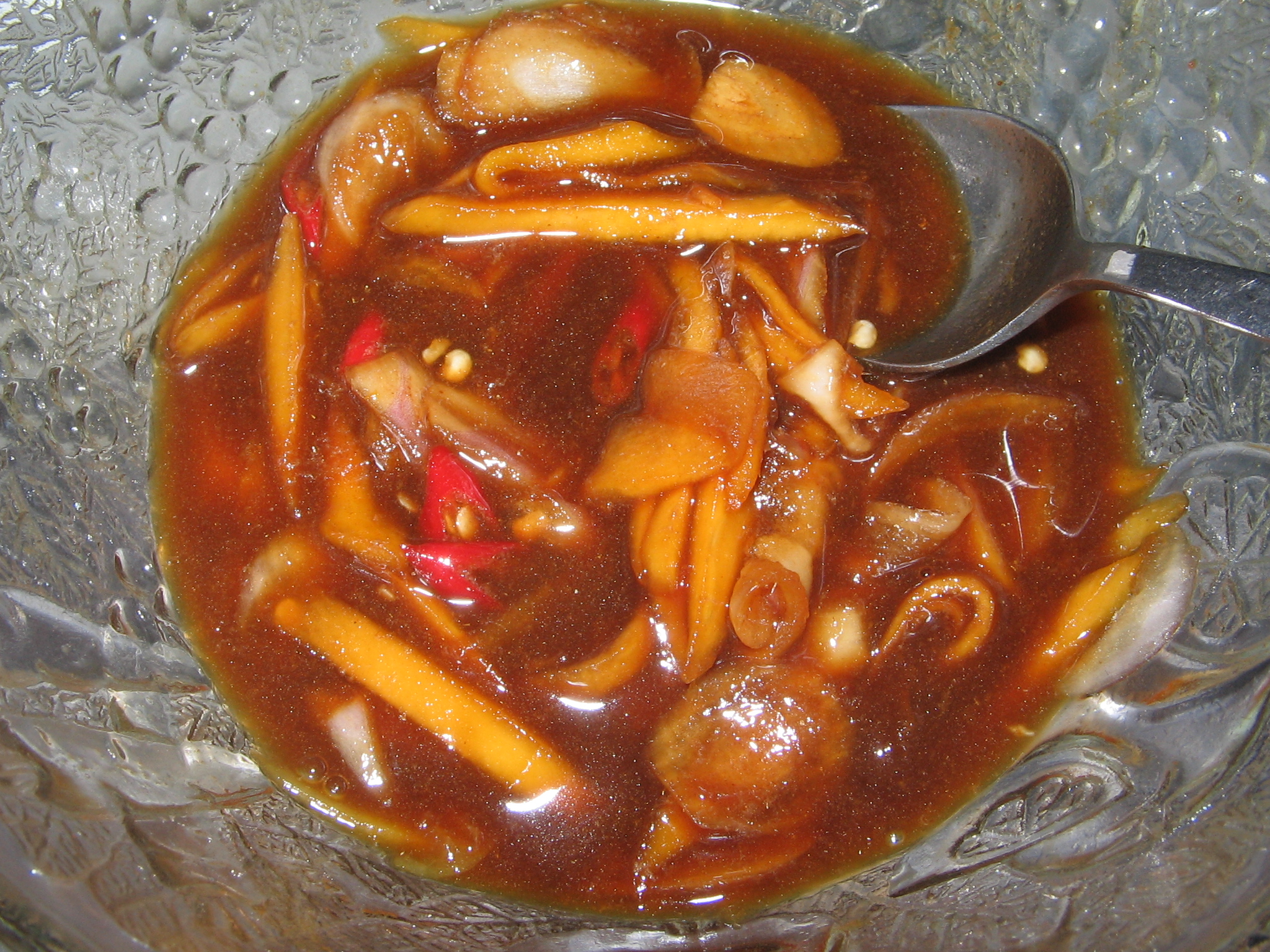
Budu

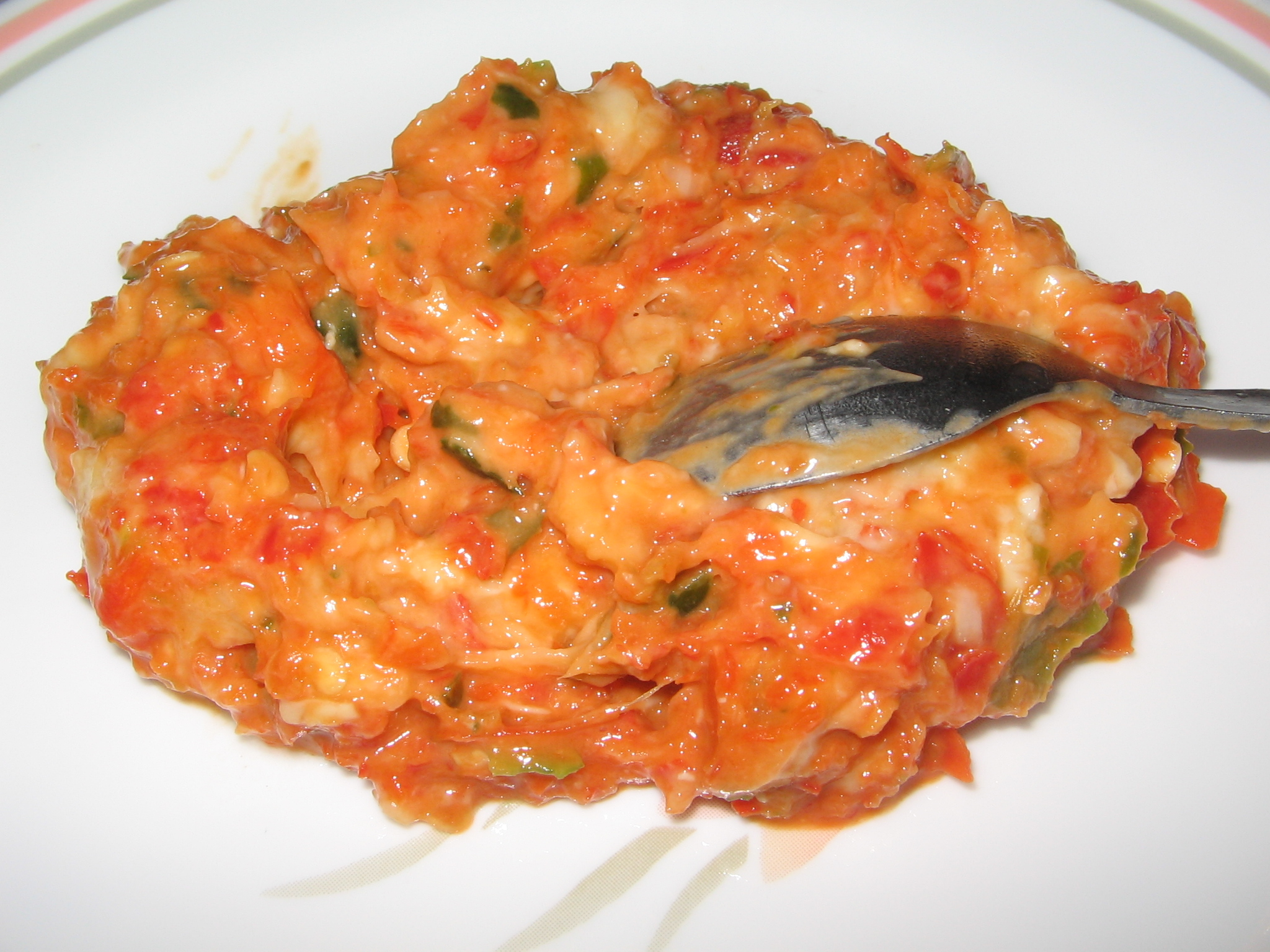
Tempoyak

- Balado, a hot and spicy sauce, made by stir-frying ground red hot chilli pepper with other spices including garlic, shallot, tomato and Key lime juice in coconut or palm oil.
- Budu, a fermented anchovy sauce.
- Kerisik, coconut-based condiment made with coconut which is grated, toasted, and ground to a paste. It is sometimes referred to as coconut butter. It is used in dishes such as kerabu salads and rendang.
- Sambal, a common chilli-based condiment to accompany many foods.
  - Sambal belacan, sambal made with chillies, shallots, garlic, stewed tomatoes, tamarind paste, coconut sugar, salt and belacan (shrimp paste).
  - Sambal gesek, sambal made by pounding fried anchovies, bird's eye chilli, onions, and garlic together and frying until fragrant.
  - Sambal sotong, squid cooked in a sambal-based sauce made with chillies, shallots, garlic, stewed tomatoes, tamarind paste and belacan.
- Serikaya, a jam made from a base of coconut milk, eggs and sugar.
- Serunding, spiced meat floss originating from Javanese cuisine. Serunding may also refer to any dish where the primary meat or vegetable ingredient is shredded and pulled into thin strands. In Indonesia, this term strictly refers to a dry-toasted grated coconut mix.
- Tempoyak, a popular Malay condiment made of durian extract which is preserved and kept in an urn. Commonly eaten with chillies and other dishes.

=== Snacks ===
Malay snacks

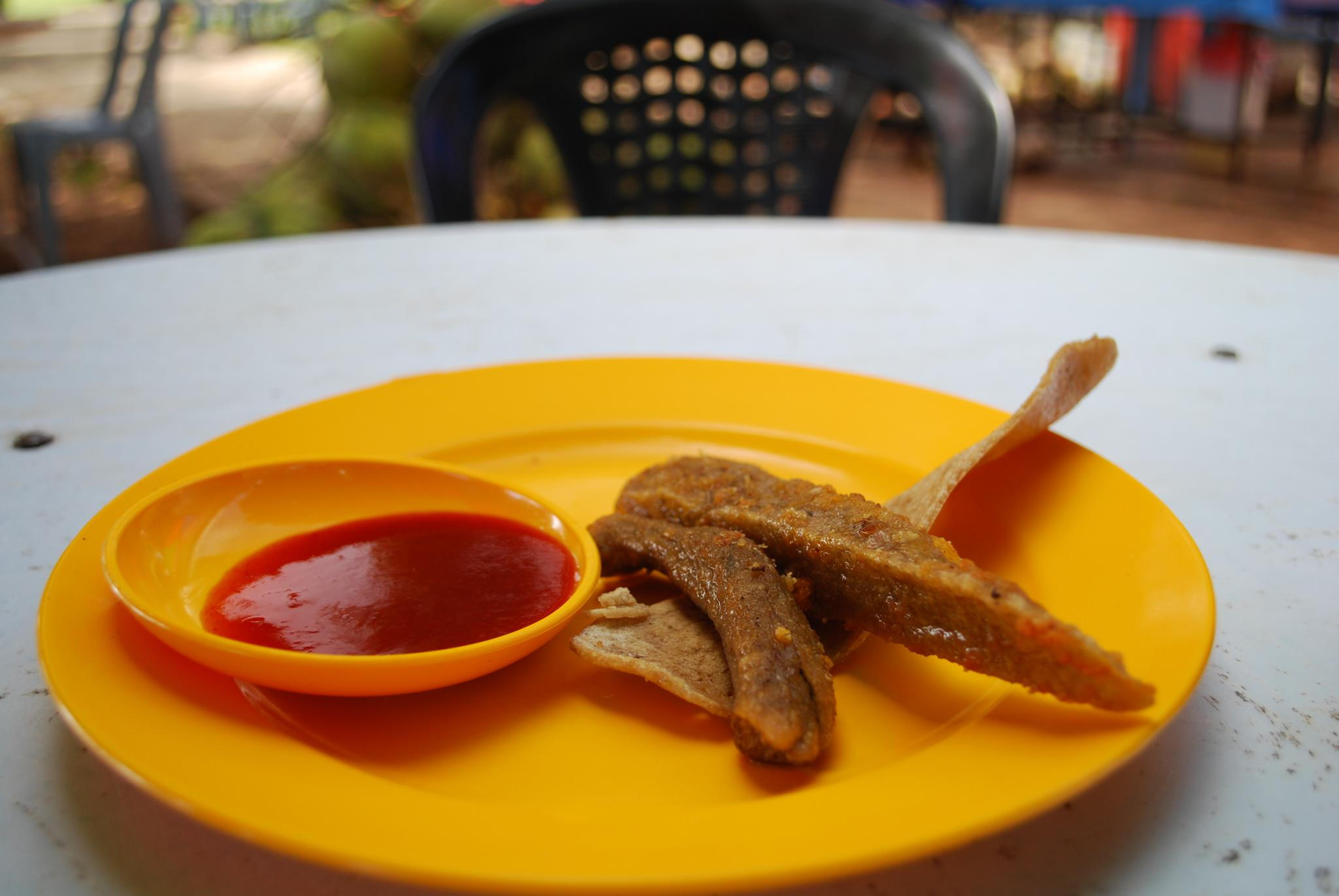
Keropok lekor

Mee siput muar

- Keropok lekor, a traditional fried fish cracker (keropok) from Terengganu.
- Mee siput muar, a deep-fried circular dried noodle snack from Muar, Johor, made from flour and eaten with sambal.

=== Kue and kuih ===
Malay kue and kuih

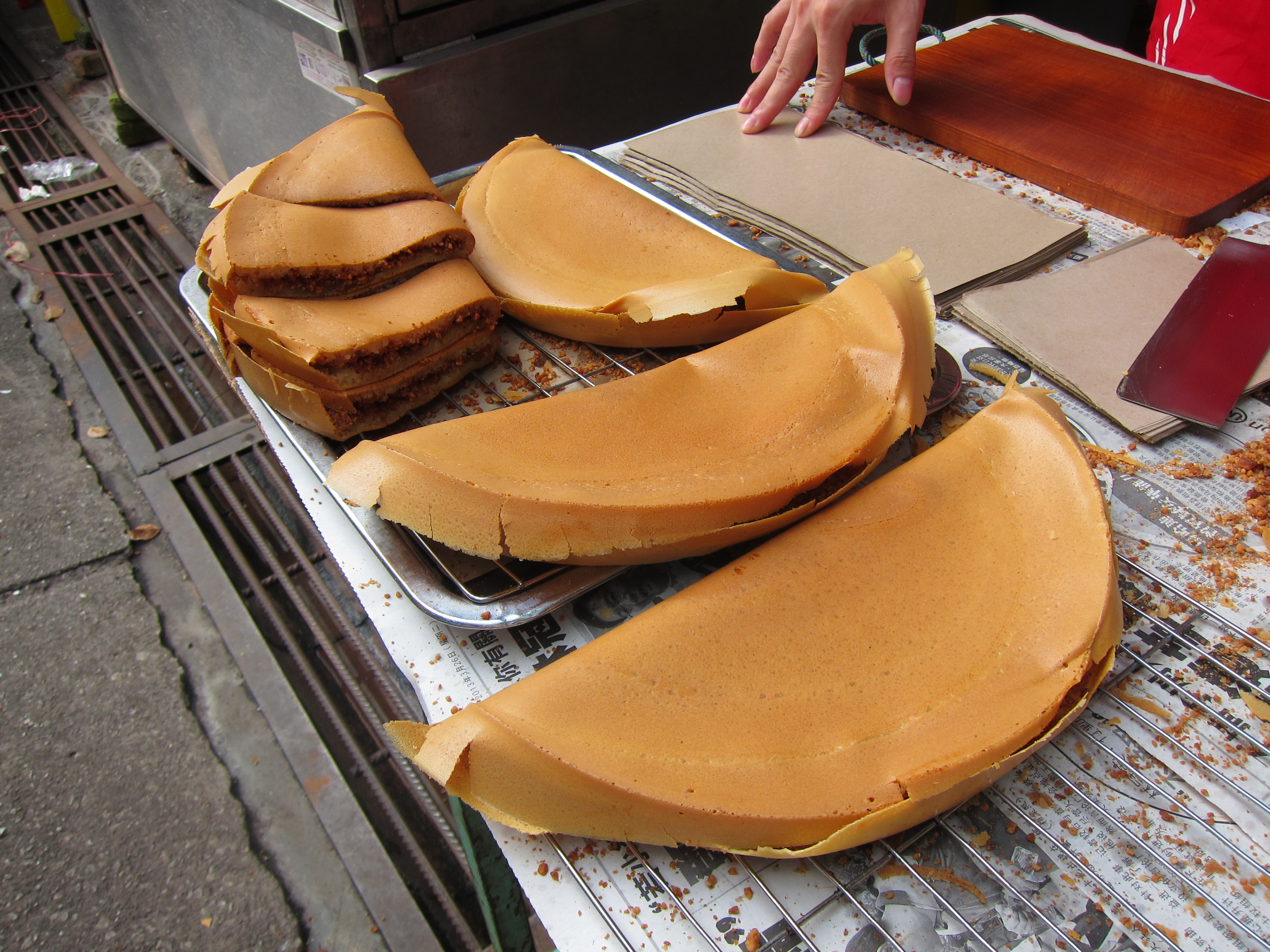
Apam balik

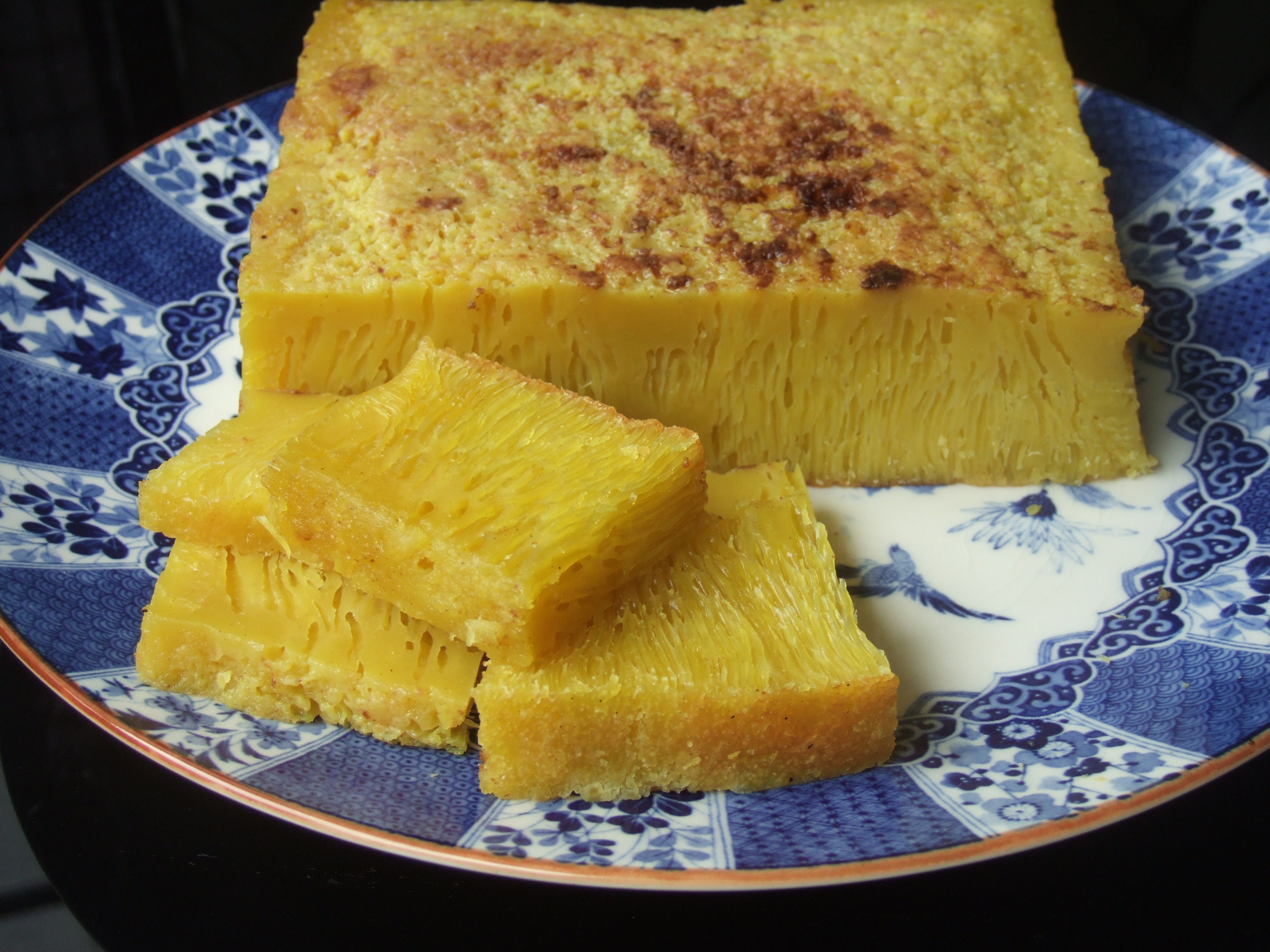
Bika ambon

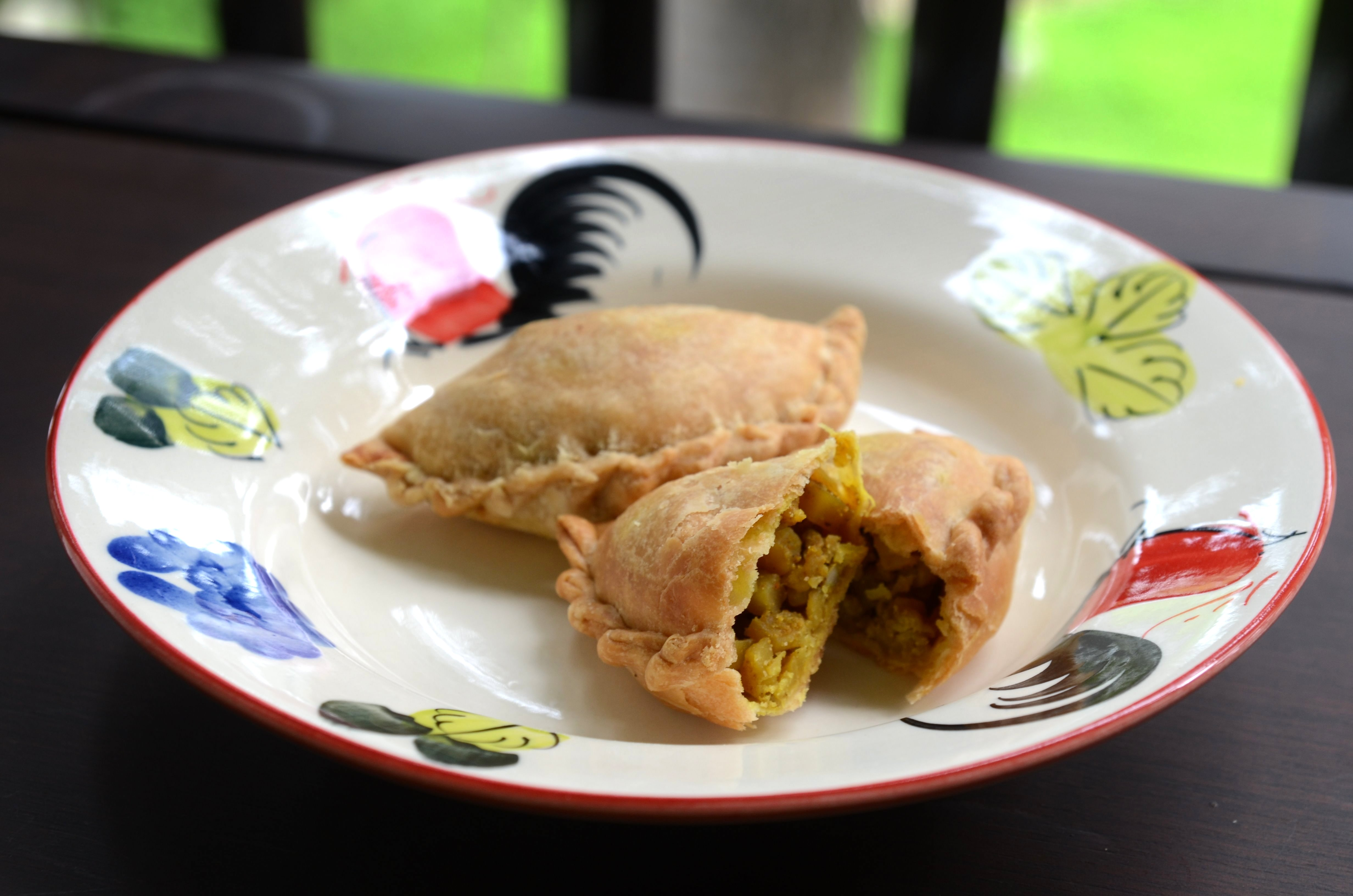
Epok-epok

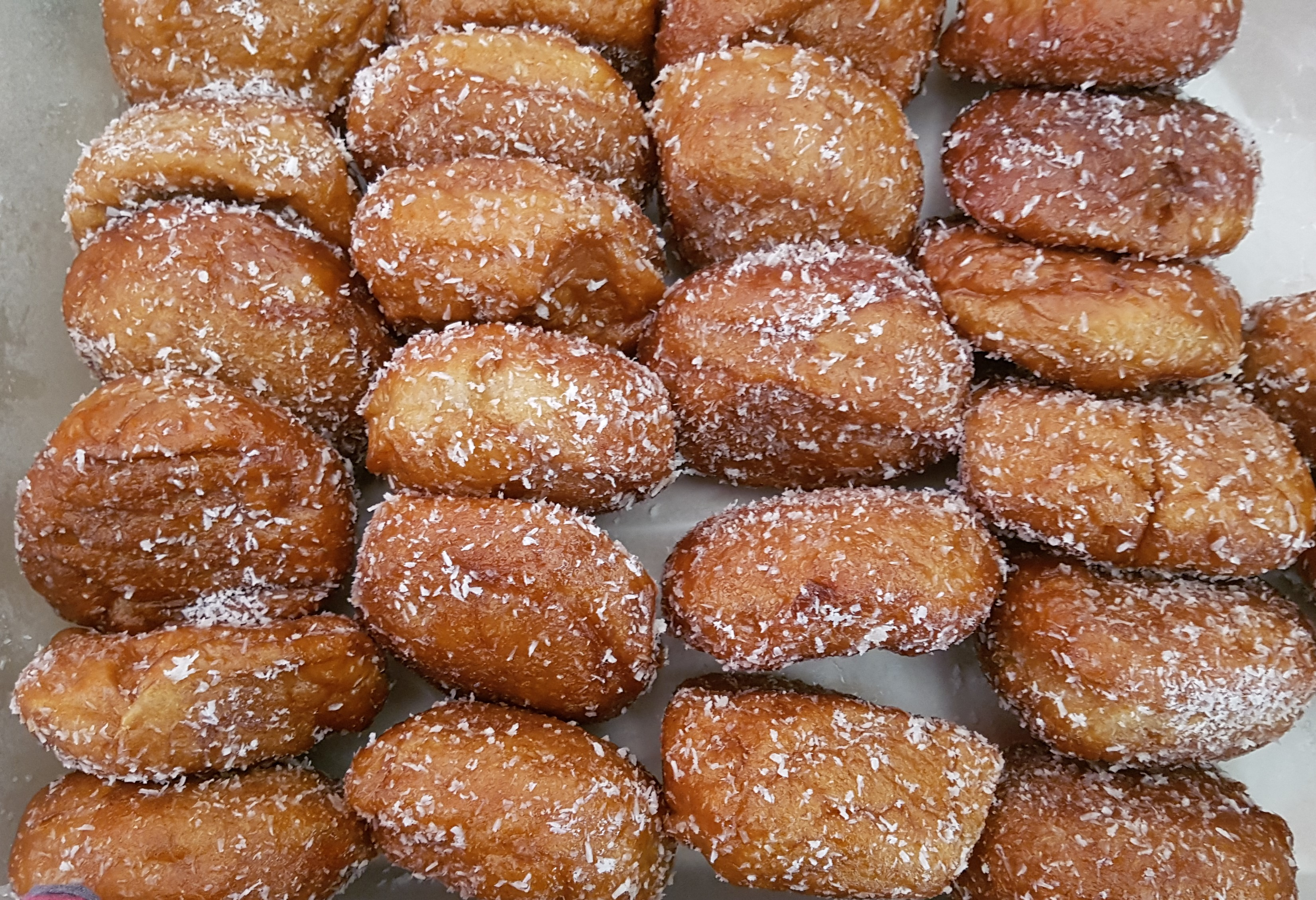
Koe'sister

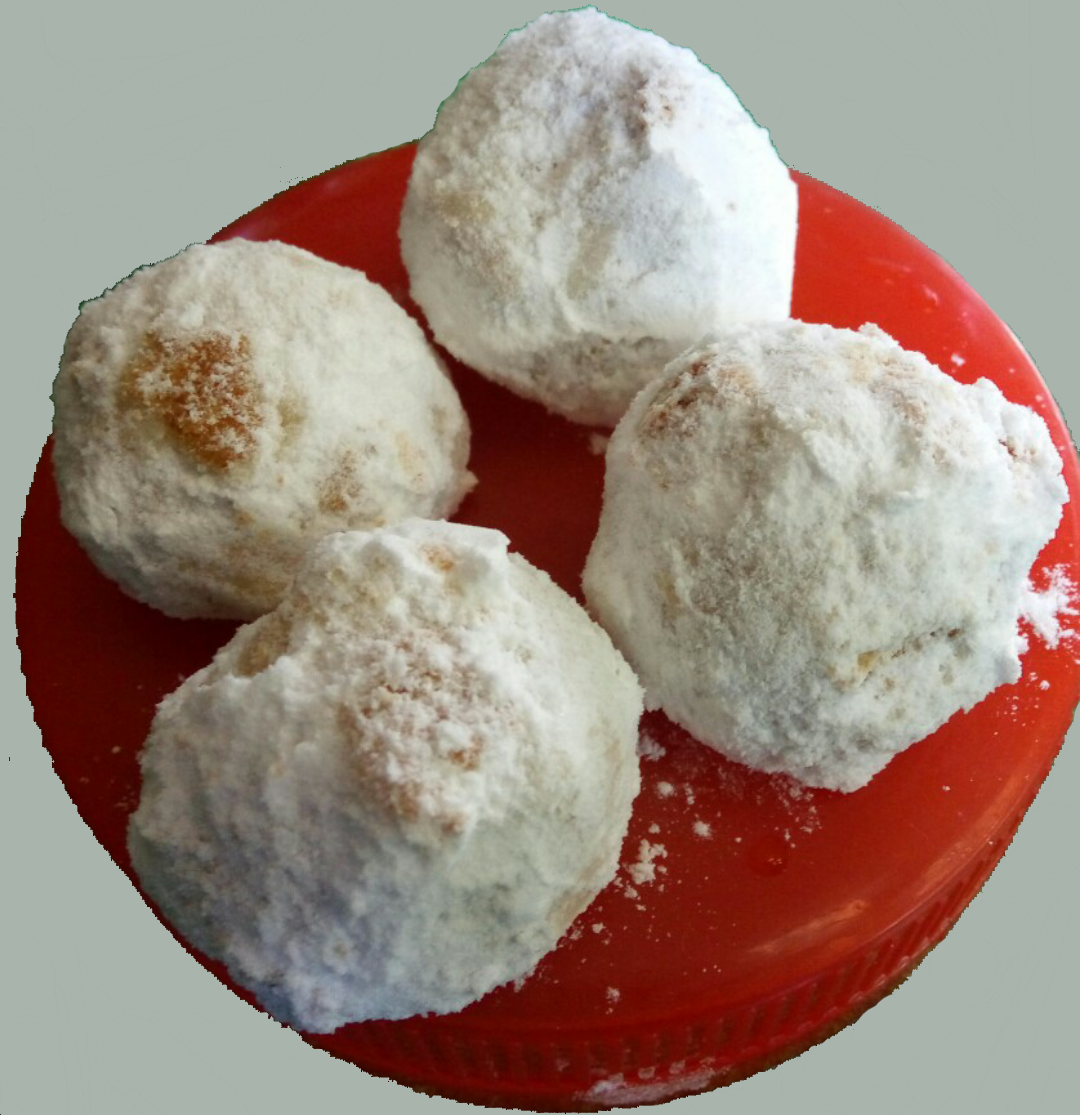
Makmur

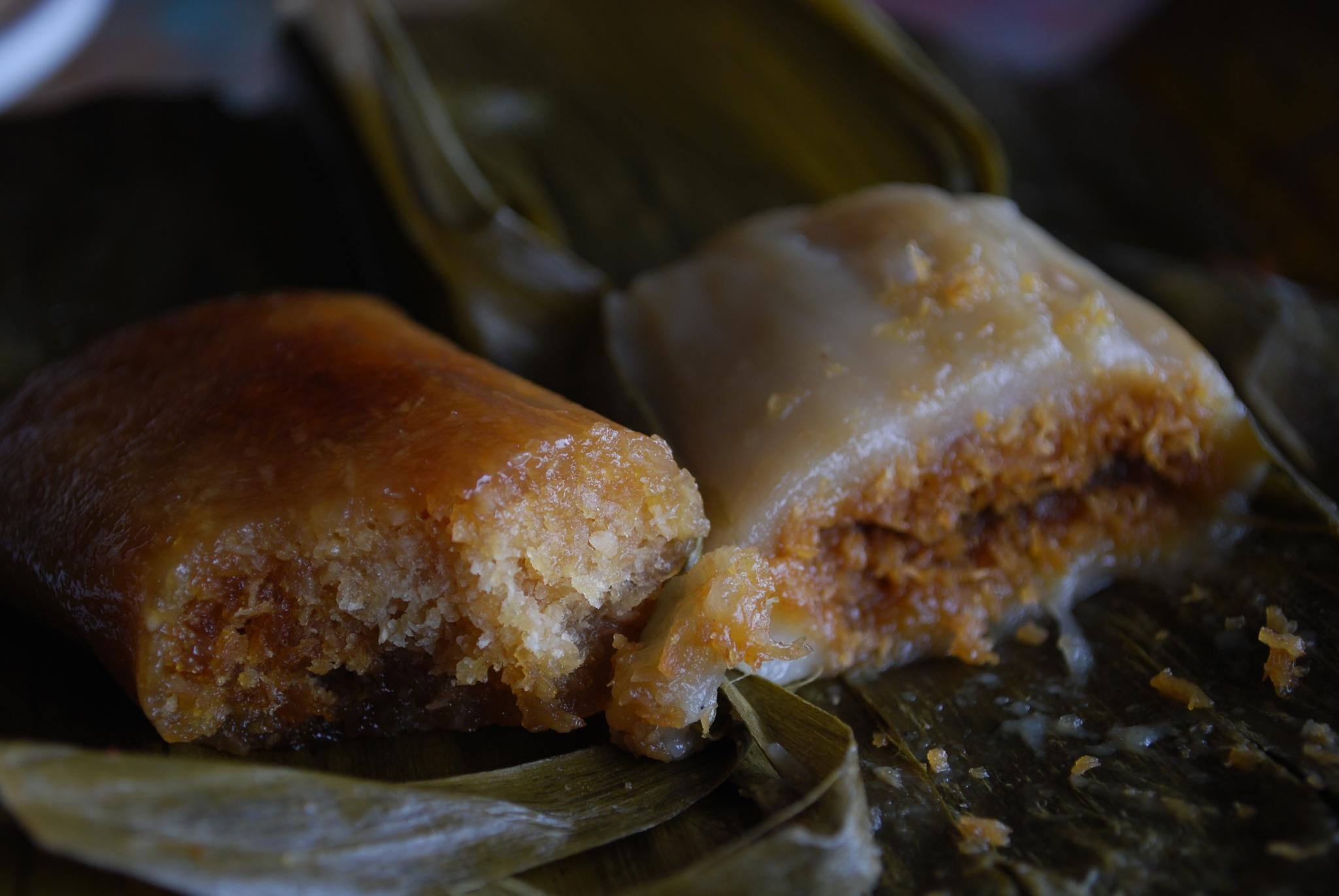
Kochi

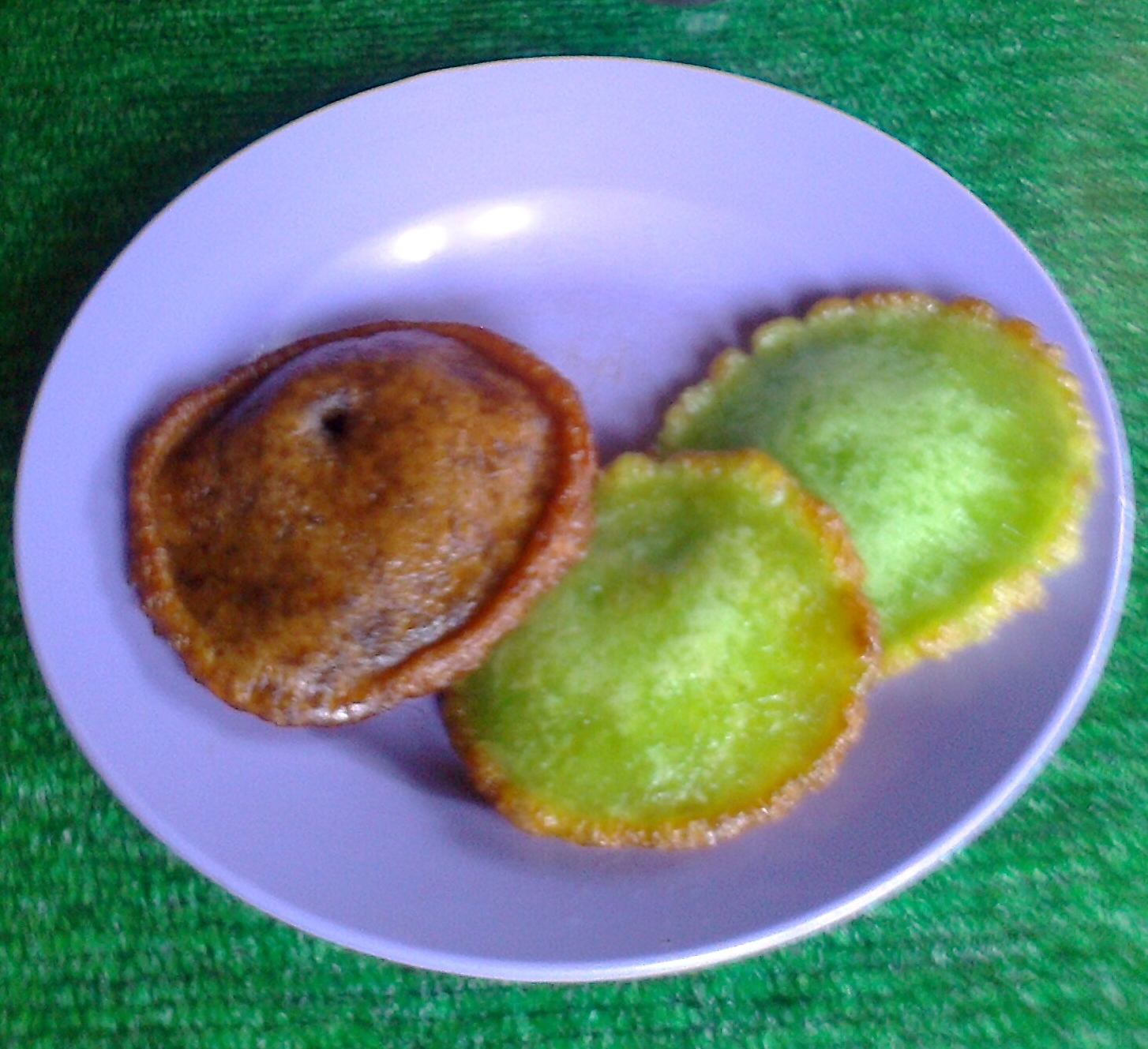
Pinjaram

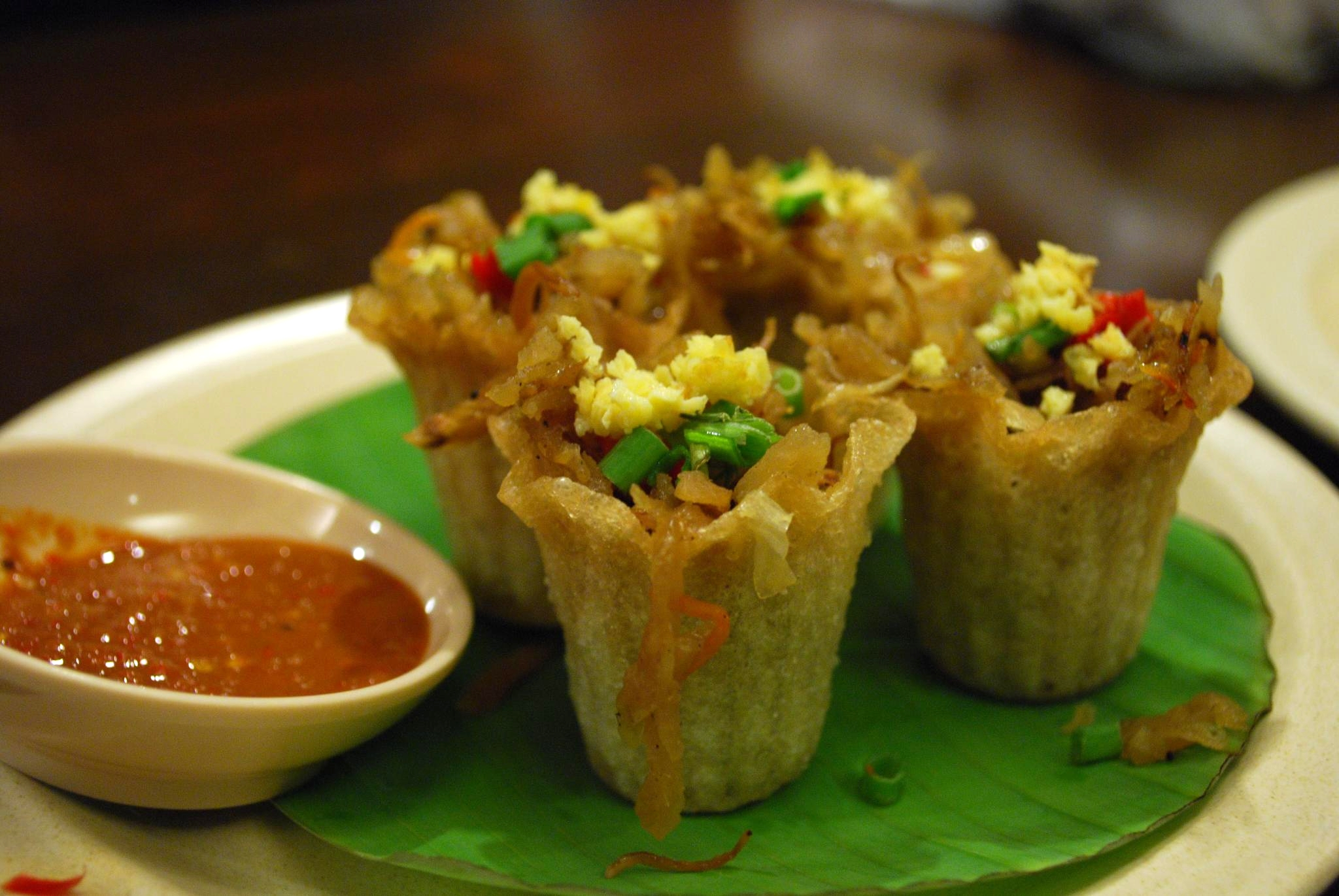
Pai ti

Kue and kuih (plural: kuih muih) is a selection of confectionery eaten as a snack during the morning or during midday, and is an important feature of festive occasions. It is a tradition shared by both the Malay and the Peranakan communities.

- Agar-agar, the Malay word for a species of red algae. A natural vegetarian gelatin counterpart, it is used to make puddings and flavoured jellies such as almond tofu, as well as fruit aspics.
- Akok, a traditional sweet dessert in Kelantan, Malaysia. Made mainly from eggs, coconut milk, flour and brown sugar, akok has a distinctive caramel taste. It is often served during afternoon snack together with coffee. Akok is prepared in a cooking utensil called dapur tembaga made of solid brass, which is surrounded with charcoal.
- Apam balik, terang bulan or martabak manis (in Indonesia), a bread-like puff with sugar, corn, and coarsely-ground nuts in the middle.
- Bahulu, a traditional round sponge cake.
- Batik, a type of chocolate cake similar to a hedgehog slice, made using Marie biscuits.
- Bika ambon, a sponge cake made from ingredients such as tapioca flour, eggs, sugar, yeast and coconut milk. This cake is a specialty of North Sumatra.
- Bingka ubi, a baked kuih of grated tapioca mixed with a little tapioca flour, coconut milk and white or brown sugar. The kuih is yellow if white caster sugar is used and brown if raw sugar or palm sugar is used. After baking, a dark brown crust tops the cake.
- Cara berlauk, a cake made of flour, egg, coconut milk and turmeric. The mixture is mixed thoroughly before being cooked in a special mould until it hardens. Before it hardens, a filling of either spiced beef or chicken is added. This kuih is very popular in the month of Ramadhan.
- Cincin, a deep fried dough pastry-based snack.
- Clorot, a traditional cake with Javanese influences made from a mixture of gula apong and rice flour, then rolled with palm leaves into cones and steamed.
- Dadar gulung or ketayap, a pancake mix filled with coconut filling. Traditionally, the juice of pandan leaves is added to the batter to get the green colour. Today green colouring is added and the flavour of the pandan leaves is obtained with artificial essence or by using pandan leaves to flavour the filling.
- Dodol, a sweet, sticky, and thick toffee-like confection, made with heavily reduced coconut milk, jaggery, and rice flour.
- Epok epok or karipap, a small pie consisting of curry with chicken and potatoes in a deep-fried pastry shell. The curry is especially thick and rich to keep it from running.
- Jemput-jemput, a traditional fritter made from flour and then fried.
- Kalu dodol, a solid toffee- and jelly-like confection made by lengthy reduction of coconut milk, thickened with rice flour and sweetened with jaggery. This dish is a specialty of Sri Lankan Malay cuisine.
- Kochi, a pyramid of glutinous rice flour filled with a sweet peanut paste.
- Koe'sister, a traditional Cape Malay pastry often described as a spicy dumpling with a cake-like texture, finished off with a sprinkling of coconut.
- Kaswi, rice cakes made with palm sugar. The ingredients are mixed into a batter and poured into small cups (traditionally Chinese teacups). When served, the cup is removed and the rice cake is topped with grated coconut.
- Keria, sweet potato doughnuts. Each doughnut is rolled in caster sugar. They are usually eaten in Malaysia for breakfast or morning tea along with other cakes such as apam or the more savoury pratha.
- Ku, a small round or oval-shaped cake made of a soft, sticky glutinous rice flour skin wrapped around a sweet filling.
- Lapis sagu or sembilan lapis, a steamed multicoloured and multilayered firm kuih made from tapioca flour, coconut milk, and flavoured with pandan. The layers are separately steamed.
- Lapis sarawak, a layered cake served in Sarawak on special occasions. It originates as a form of layer cake with various spices found in Indonesia called lapis legit.
- Makmur, a traditional cake made from butter, ghee and flour. Served during Eid al-Fitr and identified by its white colour and typical round shape.
- Pai ti, a thin and crispy pastry tart shell filled with a spicy, sweet mixture of thinly sliced vegetables and prawns.
- Pinjaram, a saucer-shaped deep fried fritter with crisp edges and a dense, chewy texture towards the centre.
- Pisang goreng, battered fried bananas.
- Pulut inti, glutinous rice topped with caramelised grated coconut and wrapped in a cut banana leaf to resemble a square pyramid.
- Pulut tai tai, also known as pulut tekan and pulut tetal, a glutinous rice cake. It is served with kaya coconut jam (jam from pandan leaves). The glutinous rice cakes are coloured with bunga telang. Half-cooked glutinous rice is divided into two portions. Both have coconut milk added but one half has bunga telang juice added. This gives the rice cake a bright blue-indigo colour. The half-cooked glutinous rice is then scooped in an alternating fashion into the tray to give it a blue and white marble effect. The rice is cooked longer and cut into tall rectangles after cooling.
- Seri muka, a two-layered dessert with steamed glutinous rice forming the bottom half and a green custard layer made with pandan juice. Coconut milk is a key ingredient in this variety of kuih. It is used as a substitute for water when cooking the glutinous rice and making the custard layer.
- Talam (lit. tray cake), a kuih consisting of two layers. The top white layer is made from rice flour and coconut milk, while the bottom green layer is made from green pea flour and extract of pandan leaf.
- Wajik, a compressed confection made of glutinous rice cooked with coconut milk and palm sugar.

=== Drinks ===
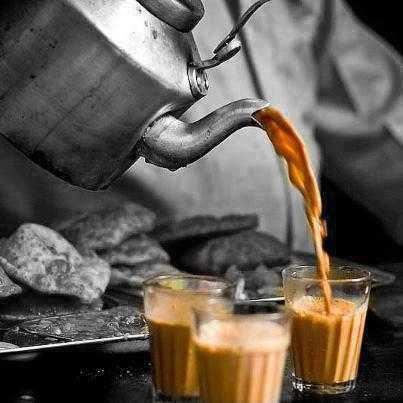
Teh tarik

- Air janda pulang, a traditional drink from Negeri Sembilan. It is suitable to drink with lunch and on hot days.
- Ais kacang, a dessert drink made of shaved ice and red beans.
- Ais krim potong, a popsicle made from coconut milk or milk, flavoured with ingredients such as red beans, rose syrup, durian, pandan, creamed corn and jackfruit.
- Boeber, a Cape Malay sweet milk drink made with vermicelli, sago, sugar, and flavoured with cardamom, stick cinnamon and rose water.
- Cendol, an iced dessert that contains droplets of green rice flour jelly, coconut milk and palm sugar syrup.
- Dadiah, a dairy-based dessert made from milk, sugar and salt which has been acidified with whey (obtained by fermenting milk overnight with asam gelugur) and steamed to form a custard-like texture. It shows influences from Minangkabau cuisine.
- Faluda, a cold drink made by mixing rose syrup, vermicelli, and sweet basil seeds with milk, often served with ice cream.
- Kopi tarik, a coffee drink made of dark roasted coffee with margarine and sugar, sweetened with condensed milk and frothed.
- Laksamana mengamuk, a traditional drink from Riau made from mango mixed with coconut milk and sugar.
- Milo dinosaur, a beverage made of a cup of iced Milo with undissolved Milo powder on top.
- Sirap bandung, a drink made of evaporated or condensed milk flavoured with rose syrup, giving it a pink colour. The drink is an adaptation of rose milk served in India.
- Teh krisan, a Chrysanthemum tea.
- Teh tarik, a popular hot milk tea beverage most commonly found in Indonesia, Malaysia and Singapore. It is made from a strong brew of black tea blended with condensed milk.

== See also ==
- Christmas Island cuisine
- Cocos (Keeling) Islands cuisine
- Kue
- Malaysian cuisine
- Malaysian Chinese cuisine
- Malaysian Indian cuisine
