= Roti canai =

Indian-influenced flatbread dish in Southeast Asia

Roti canai / roti prata
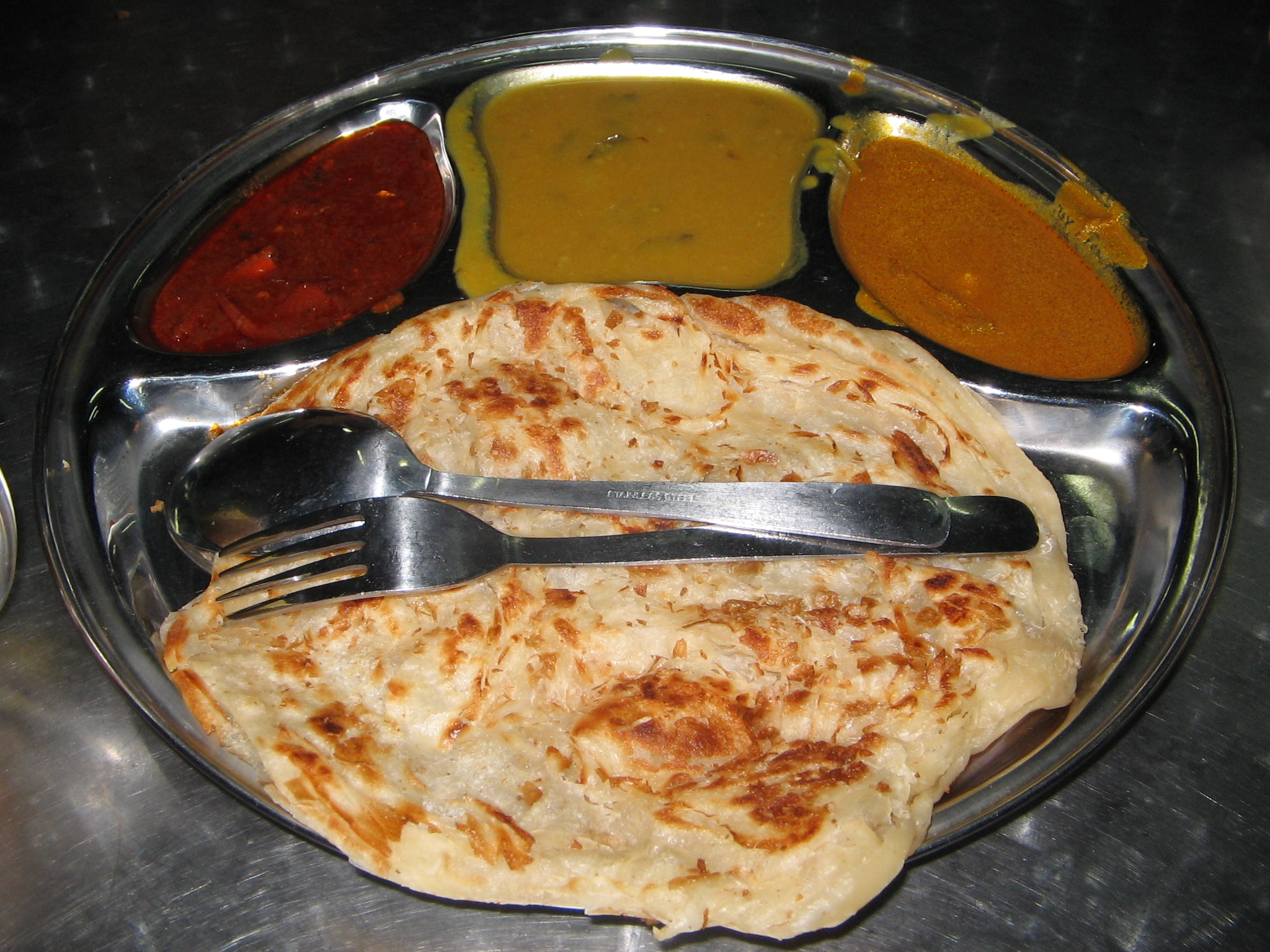
- Roti canai or roti prata is usually served with either curry, dal, or chilli as dipping sauce
- Alternative names: Roti cane; roti chanai; roti konde; roti maryam; roti prata; roti parotta; crisp pulled flatbread
- Type: Flatbread
- Course: Main course, usually for breakfast
- Region or state: Southeast Asia
- Associated cuisine: Brunei, Indonesia, Malaysia, Singapore, and Thailand
- Created by: South Indian diaspora in Southeast Asia
- Serving temperature: Hot
- Main ingredients: Flour
- Variations: Roti tissue, murtabak
- Food energy (per serving): 302 kcal (1,260 kJ)
- Similar dishes: Paratha; parotta

Breakfast culture in Malaysia: dining experience in a multi-ethnic society
- UNESCO Intangible Cultural Heritage
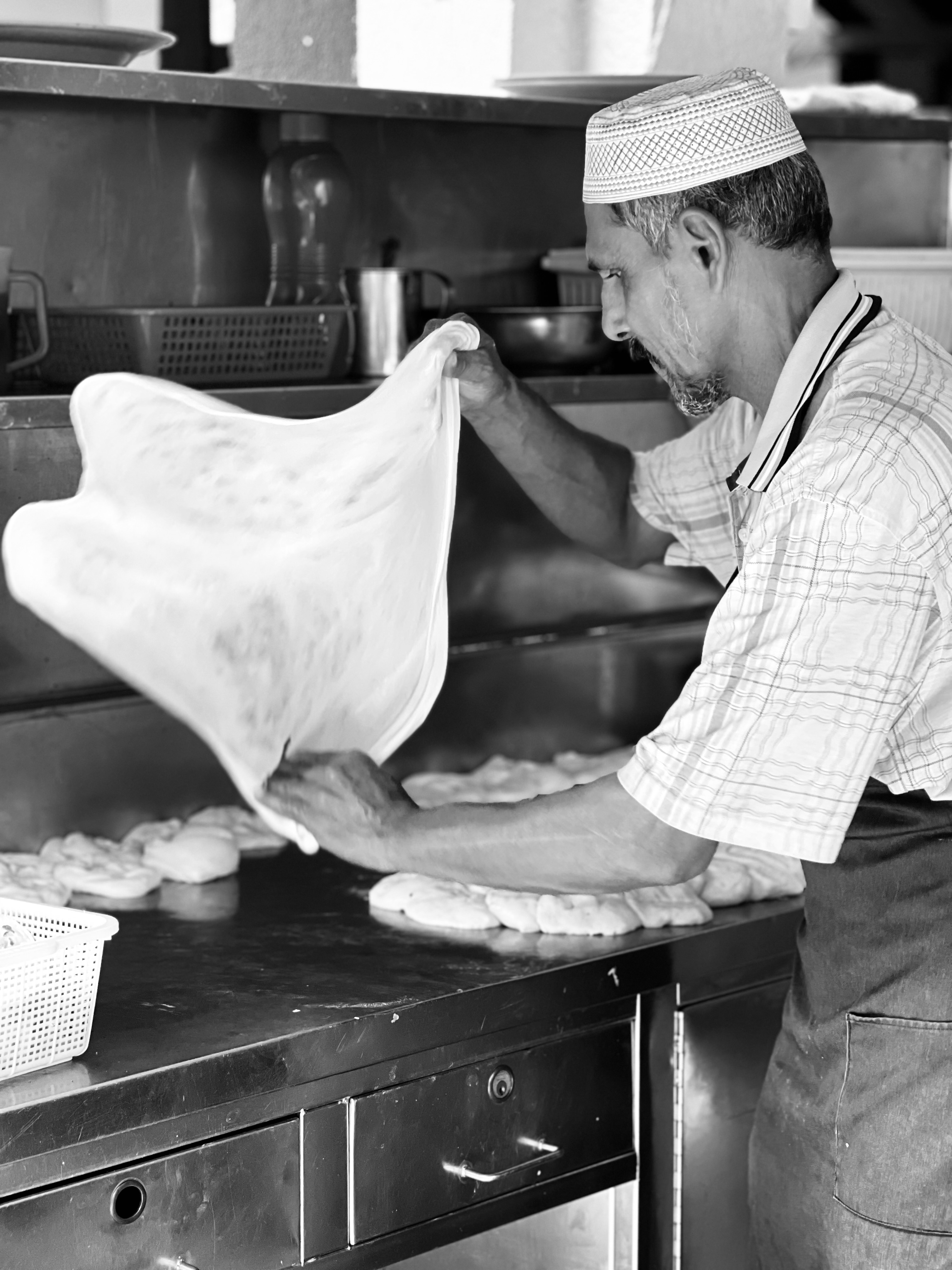
- A roti canai maker flipping the bread
- Country: Malaysia
- Reference: 02113
- Region: Asia and the Pacific

Inscription history
- Inscription: 2024 (19th session)
- List: Representative

Roti canai (/tʃa'naj/), or roti prata (in Singapore), also known as roti chanai and roti cane, is an unleavened flatbread of Indian origin found in the cuisines of Southeast Asia, especially those of Brunei, Indonesia, Malaysia, Singapore, and Thailand. It is typically accompanied by dal or various forms of curry, although it can also be prepared in an array of sweet or savoury adaptations utilising diverse components like meat, eggs, or cheese and dipped in condensed milk as well as paired with mee goreng. It was nominated to the UNESCO Intangible Cultural Heritage List of food and drinks in 2024 by Malaysia, where it was subsequently listed.

== Etymology ==
Roti canai is attested in Malay since at least 1970. Roti is borrowed from the Sanskrit "रोटिका" (roṭikā), meaning "bread" in English. Canai probably comes from the Malay word "canai", which carries the meaning "to roll dough thinly". Less likely theories suggest that the name comes from the Indian city of Chennai or from the Hindi chana, meaning "chickpea" or "chickpea stew", which it often accompanies. This traditional Indian-derived food is popular throughout Southeast Asia under various names. In Singapore, the dish is known as roti prata, from the Indian paratha or parotta. Within Indonesia, the dish is either referred to as roti cane, roti konde, or roti maryam.

== History and background ==
Since being introduced to Southeast Asia around the 19th century, roti canai has become a popular breakfast and snack dish and is one of the most common South Indian foods in the region. It is said that Indians brought the dish during the era of British Malaya, where it was served in street mamak stalls located in both rural and urban areas. Within Southeast Asia, it can often be found in settlements that have populations of Indian descent, especially in Malaysia, Singapore, Brunei, Indonesia, and Thailand. It has also been theorised that the dish had been introduced by Indian traders to the Indonesian province of Aceh, in northern Sumatra, in the 17th century, under the name roti cane, from where it spread throughout the Dutch East Indies by the early 19th century. It can nowadays be found in various parts of Indonesia, especially in North Sumatra, West Sumatra, and Riau, where the Indian Indonesian community is concentrated. Singapore and Malaysia, which split in 1965, both claim it as a speciality of local cuisine. In 2024, Malaysia successfully nominated it, along with nasi lemak and teh tarik, for United Nations recognition as intangible cultural heritage.

== Regional variations ==
Plain roti is often referred to as roti kosong ("empty bread" in the Malay language). Traditionally, roti canai is served with dal (lentil) curry but may also be eaten with the following types of curries:

- Kari ayam – chicken curry
- Kari daging – beef curry
- Kari kambing – mutton curry
- Kari ikan – fish curry (mostly served with stingray)
- Kari campur – mixed curry
- Kari kacang kuda – chickpea curry

=== Brunei, Malaysia, and Singapore ===
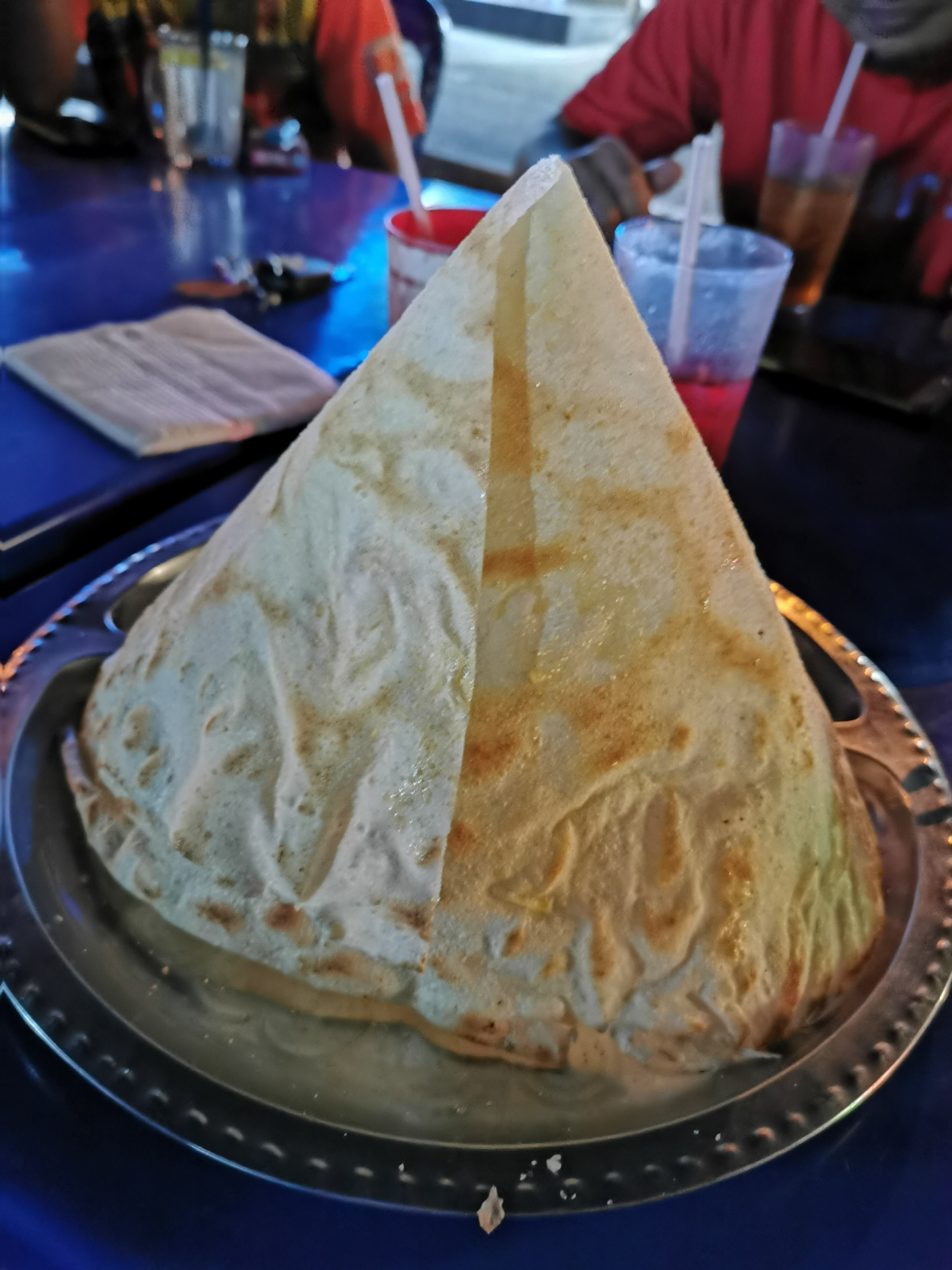
Roti tisu in Bandar Mahkota Cheras, Selangor, Malaysia

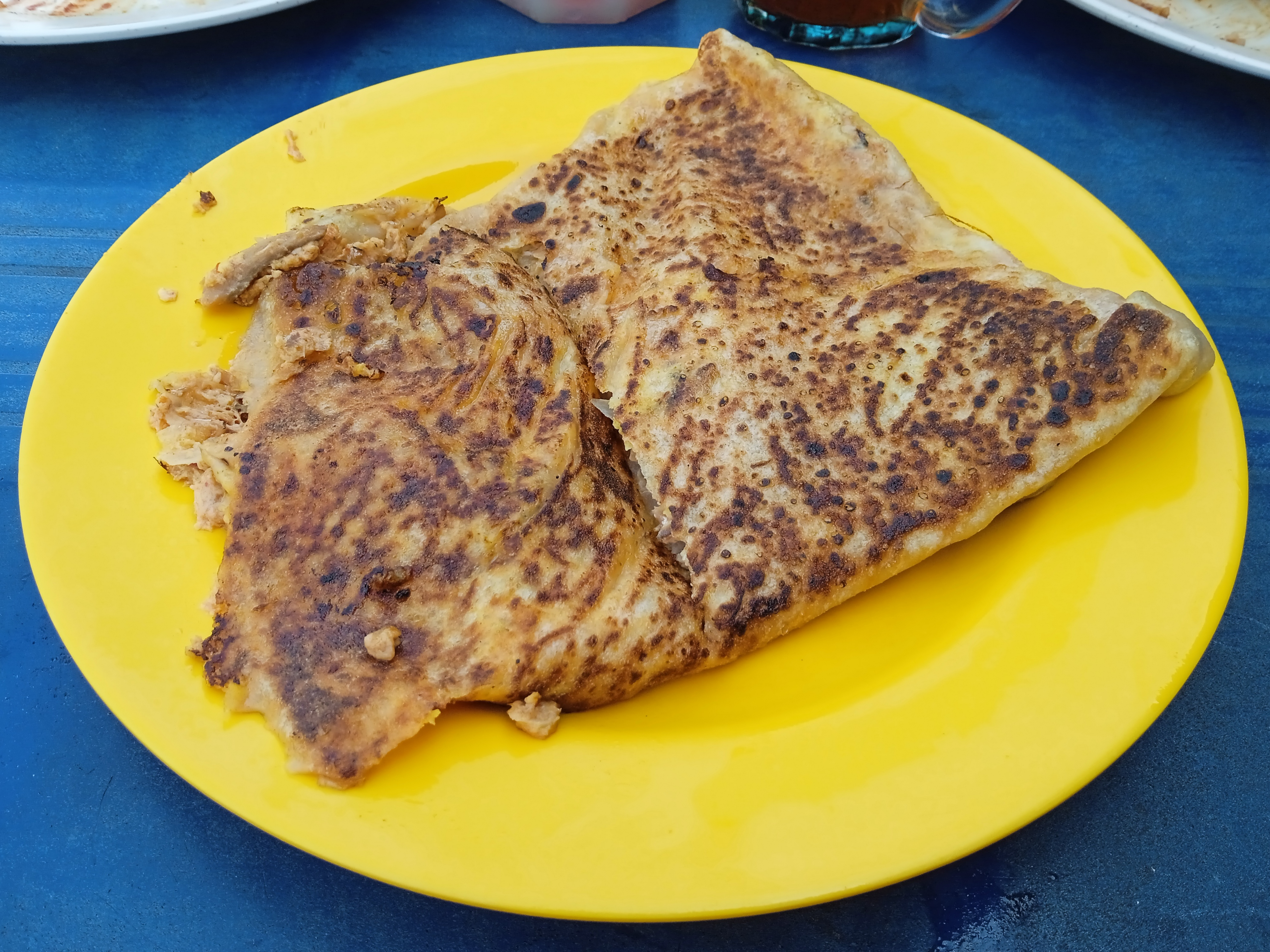
Roti sardin (sardine-stuffed roti)

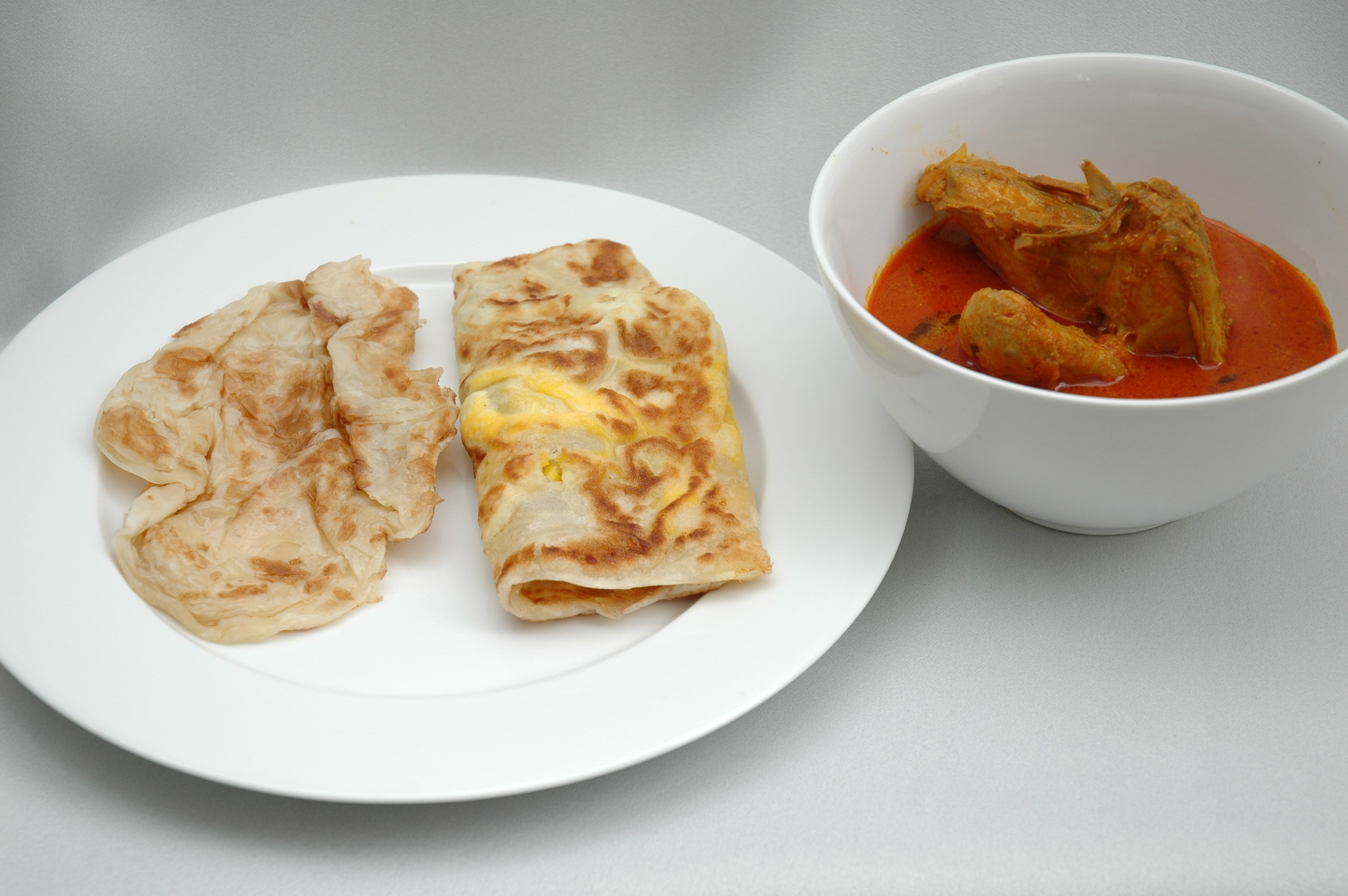
Singapore-style plain roti prata (left) and egg prata (centre), with a bowl of chicken curry on the side

Different types of roti canai are served in Brunei and Malaysia:

- Murtabak, a very thick roti filled with a mixture of egg, meat, onions, and spices. In Brunei, Malaysia, and Singapore, it is usually prepared on a griddle like roti canai, but in Indonesia, it is often deep-fried in a wok. In Thailand, it is called mataba. In Malaysia, Singapore, and Thailand, murtabak is made using the same dough used for roti canai and on the same equipment, in the same stalls. Most murtabak in Malaysia tends to have less minced meat and more egg than Singaporean or Johorean variants. Murtabak cheese is a variation, with added mozzarella cheese
- Roti telur, with an egg (telur) stuffing
- Roti jantan, roti telur with two-egg stuffing
- Roti bawang, with onion (bawang) stuffing
- Roti telur bawang, with eggs and onions
- Roti boom (or bom; 'bomb bread'), a smaller but thicker roti, with the dough wound in a spiral. It is served with sugar and margarine, or with curry
- Roti planta, stuffed with margarine (often Planta brand) and sugar
- Roti sardin, stuffed with canned sardine, with or without egg, and sometimes mixed with ketchup or sambal, similar to murtabak
- Roti pisang, stuffed with sliced bananas (pisang)
- Roti sayur, stuffed with shredded or sliced vegetables
- Roti salad, raw shredded vegetables rolled up with a piece of roti
- Roti tisu, a tissue-paper-thin and flaky roti, usually with sprinkled sugar and condensed milk. Also called roomali roti, from roomal (Hindi, meaning "handkerchief")
- Roti kaya, with kaya spread
- Roti maggi, stuffed with prepared instant noodles, usually Maggi brand
- Roti cheese, stuffed with cheese
- Roti milo, stuffed with Milo powder
- Roti cobra, served with chicken curry and a piece of fried egg on top. Most commonly found in East Malaysia, especially in Sabah
- Roti banjir ("flooded roti"), usually chopped into pieces, with curry poured over the top
- Roti tsunami, roti banjir with added sambal and soft-boiled eggs
- Roti Doll ("Doll's roti"), roti banjir with added sambal and a fried egg on top. Most commonly found in northern Malaysia, especially in the town of Alor Setar, Kedah.
- Roti Sarang Burung ("bird's nest roti"), roti cooked in a doughnut shape with a fried egg in the hole, similar to egg in the basket and khachapuri
- Roti prata in Singapore and southern Malaysia, a fried flatbread cooked over a flat grilling pan. It is usually served with sugar or a vegetable- or meat-based curry and is also commonly cooked with cheese, onions, bananas, red beans, chocolate, mushrooms, or eggs.
- Roti tampal or roti plaster (in Singapore): the roti is plastered on one side with egg, with the yolk left runny or totally cooked

=== Indonesia ===
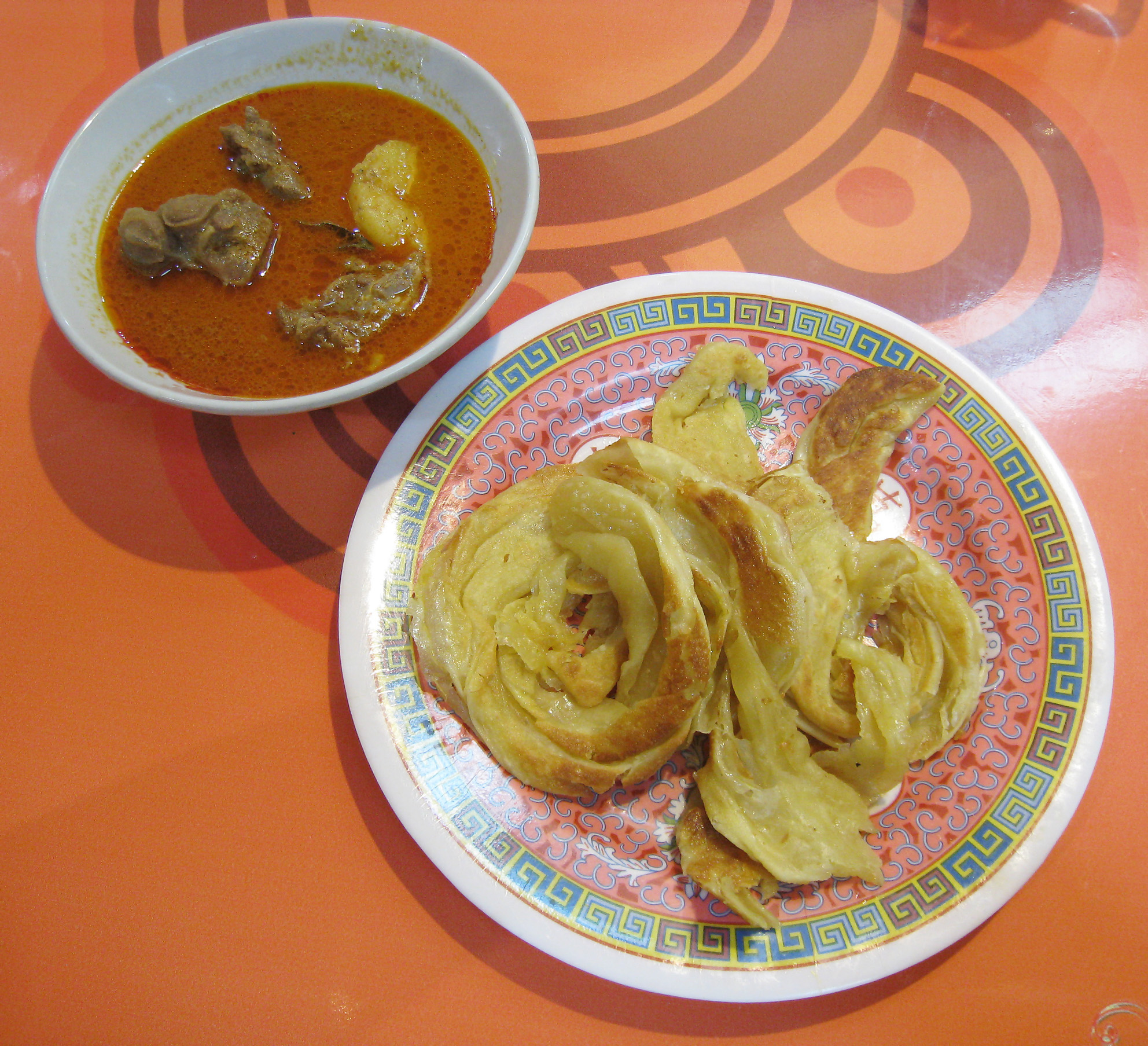
Roti cane served with mutton and potato curry in an Acehnese restaurant

Roti cane is thought to have come to Indonesia via Muslim Indian migration to the Aceh Sultanate, in the northern parts of Sumatra, around the 17th century, and later to the rest of the Dutch East Indies, in the early 19th century. It has since been adopted into the Malay, Acehnese, and Minangkabau cuisine of Sumatra. Consequently, there are Malay, Acehnese, and Minangkabau restaurants serving the dish with mutton curry that are operated by ethnic groups other than Indians. Two types of popular roti cane dishes include sweet roti cane, served with various toppings such as cheese, chocolate sprinkles, and chocolate syrup; and savoury roti cane, served with curry sauce. In Indonesia, roti cane is often associated with Acehnese cuisine, despite its Indian origin.

In Ampel, an Arab quarter in Surabaya, the dish is known as roti maryam, while the Javanese call it roti konde, after its shape, which resembles a hairbun (Javanese: konde). Despite having different names, each variant is derivative of the Indian paratha and is similar in preparation. Indian-influenced roti is typically served with Mutton curry.

=== Thailand ===
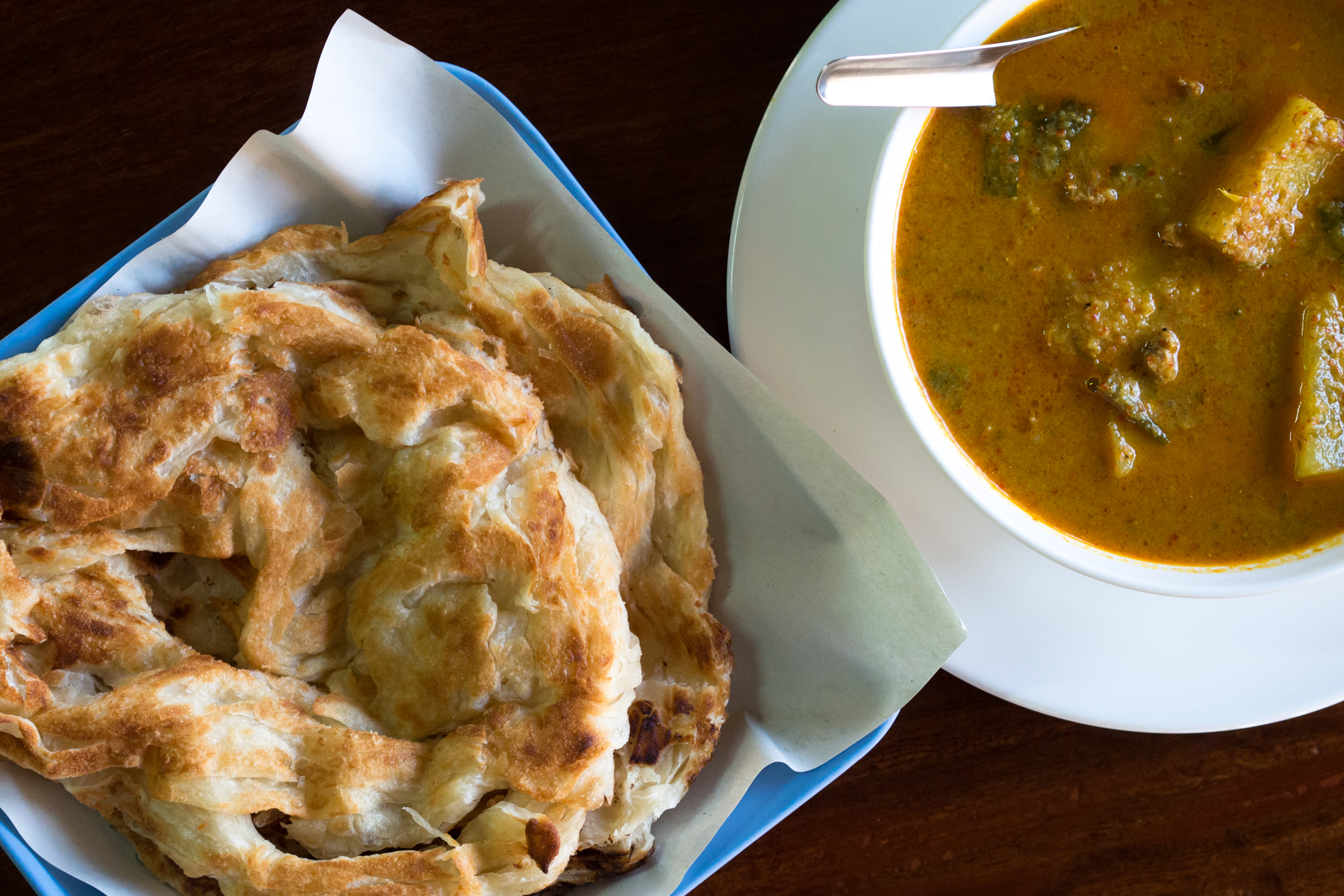
Thai-style roti thitchu, served with a Muslim-style beef curry

In Thailand, roti (with variations on spelling such as ro tee) is commonly available from street carts, usually halal, sold by Thai Malay Muslims. Roti thitchu (Thai for "tissue") is Thai roti canai that is fluffed up by clapping it between two hands inside a dry cloth after frying, and served with a Thai Muslim-style beef curry. In some parts of Thailand, roti is also commonly eaten with mango, banana, sugar, condensed milk, jam, peanut butter, or Nutella, although plain egg roti is also available.

== Preparation ==
Roti canai is a flatbread made from unleavened dough that is composed of fat (usually ghee), flour, and water; some recipes also include sweetened condensed milk. The dough is repeatedly kneaded, flattened, oiled, and folded, creating layers. The dough ball is then flattened, spread out until paper-thin (usually by "tossing" it on a flat surface), and gathered into a long rope-like mass. This "rope" is then wound into a knot or spiral and flattened, so that it consists of thin flakes of dough when cooked. When making varieties with fillings, the fillings (eggs, chopped onions, etc.) are spread or sprinkled on the thin sheet of dough, which is then folded with the fillings inside.

== Gallery ==
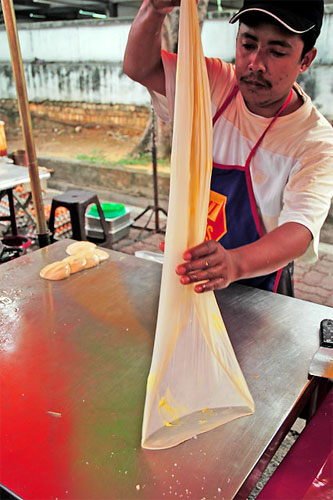
The mixture is kneaded, flattened, and then oiled, before being folded repeatedly.

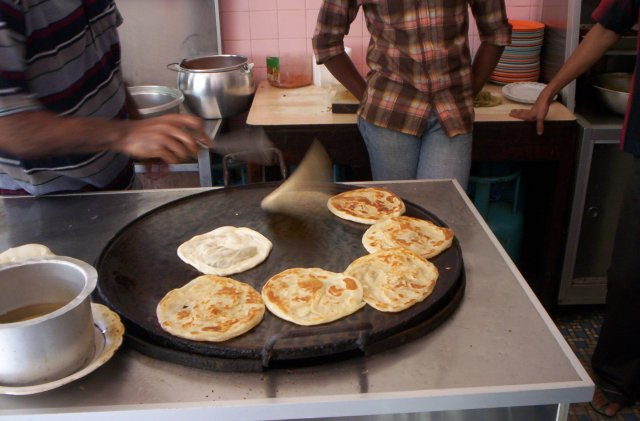
Roti canai is cooked on a tava with a lot of oil

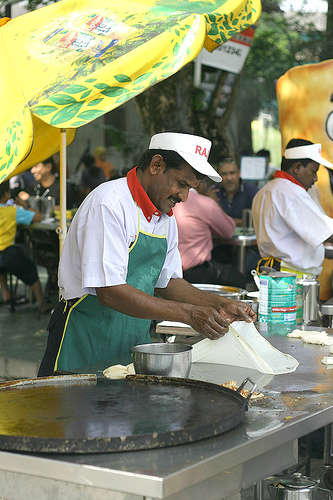
Roti canai preparation

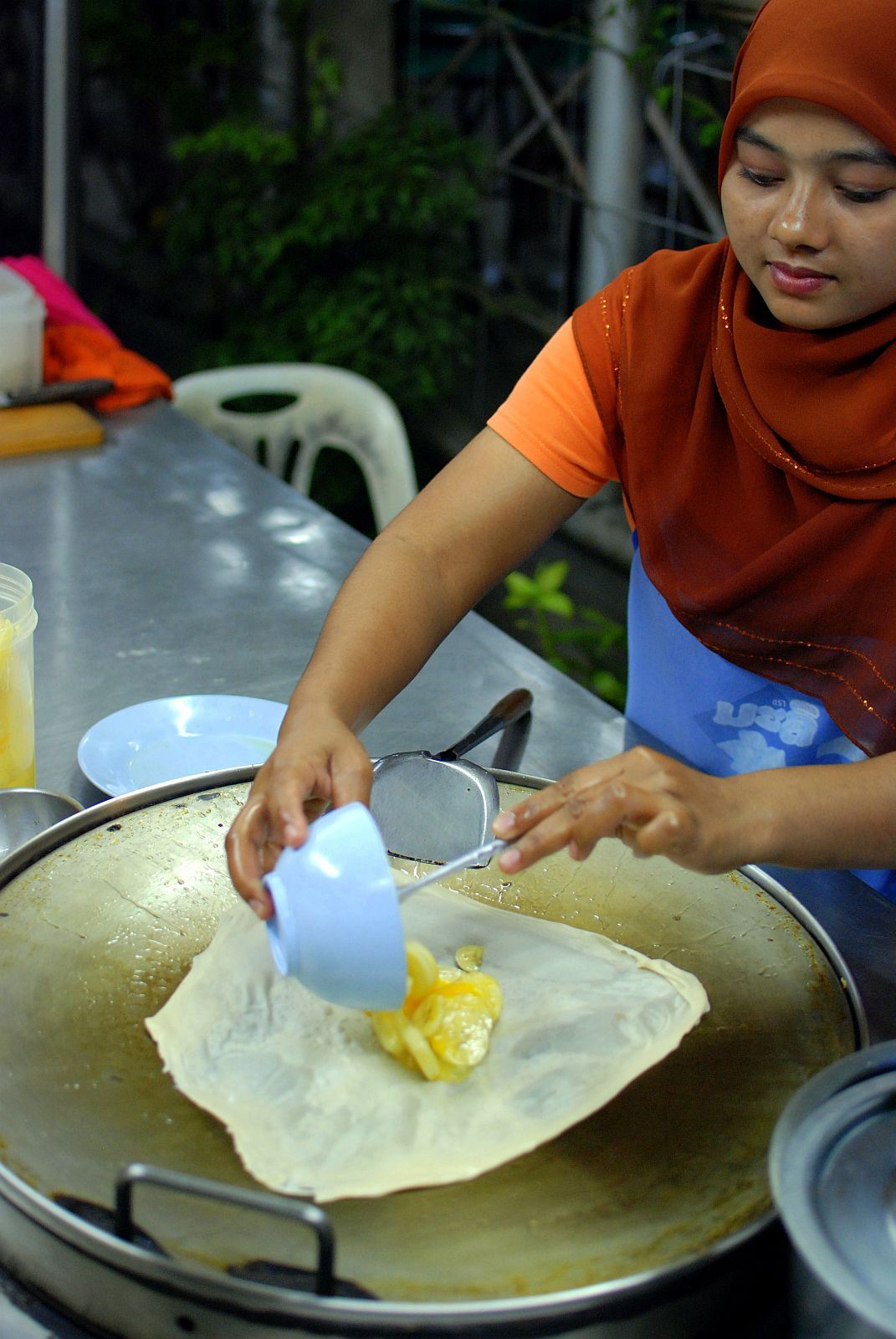
A sweet Thai roti kluai khai. Similar to roti canai, it is folded around a filling of sliced bananas and eggs.

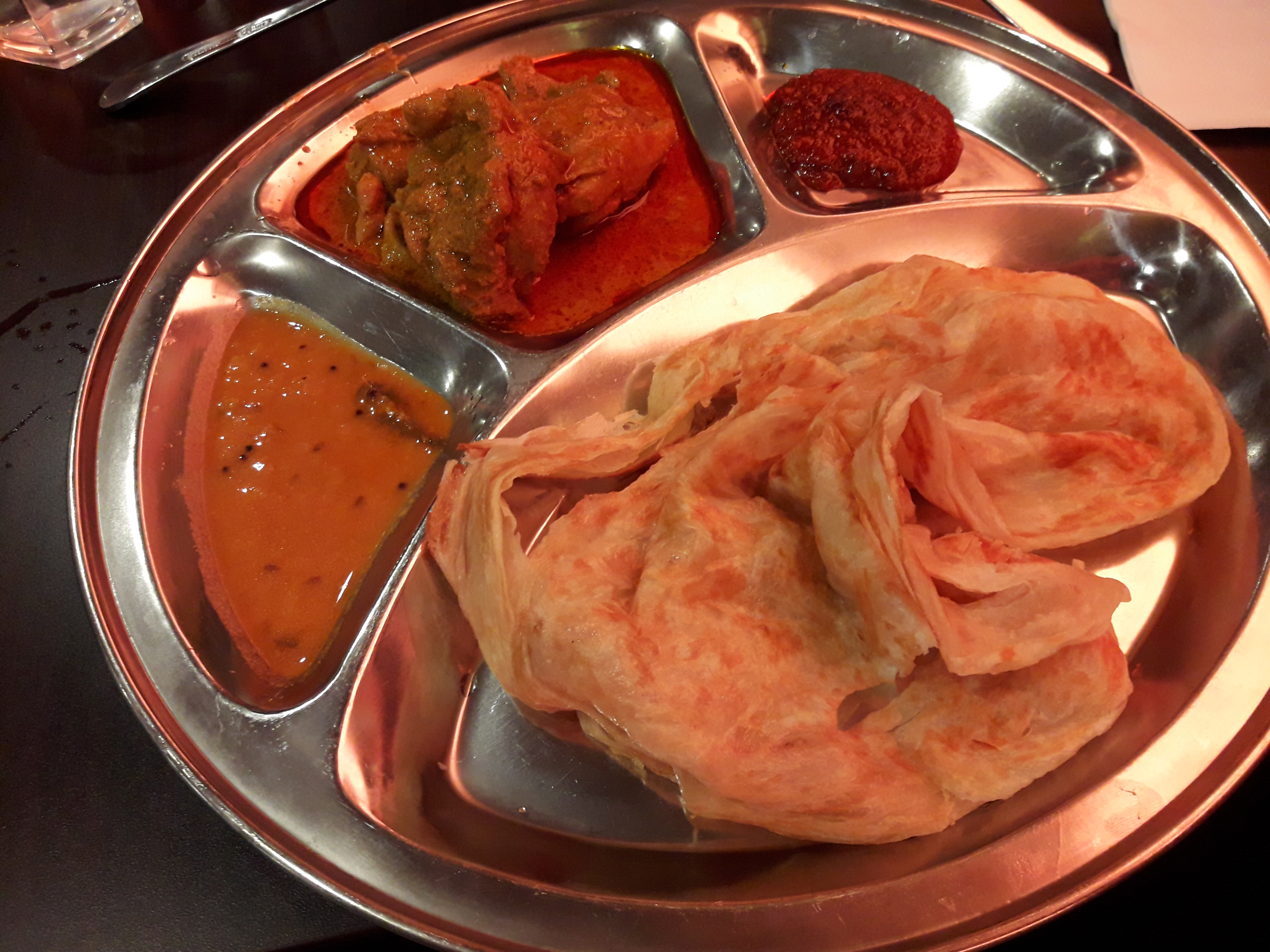
Roti canai with chicken curry in Auckland, New Zealand

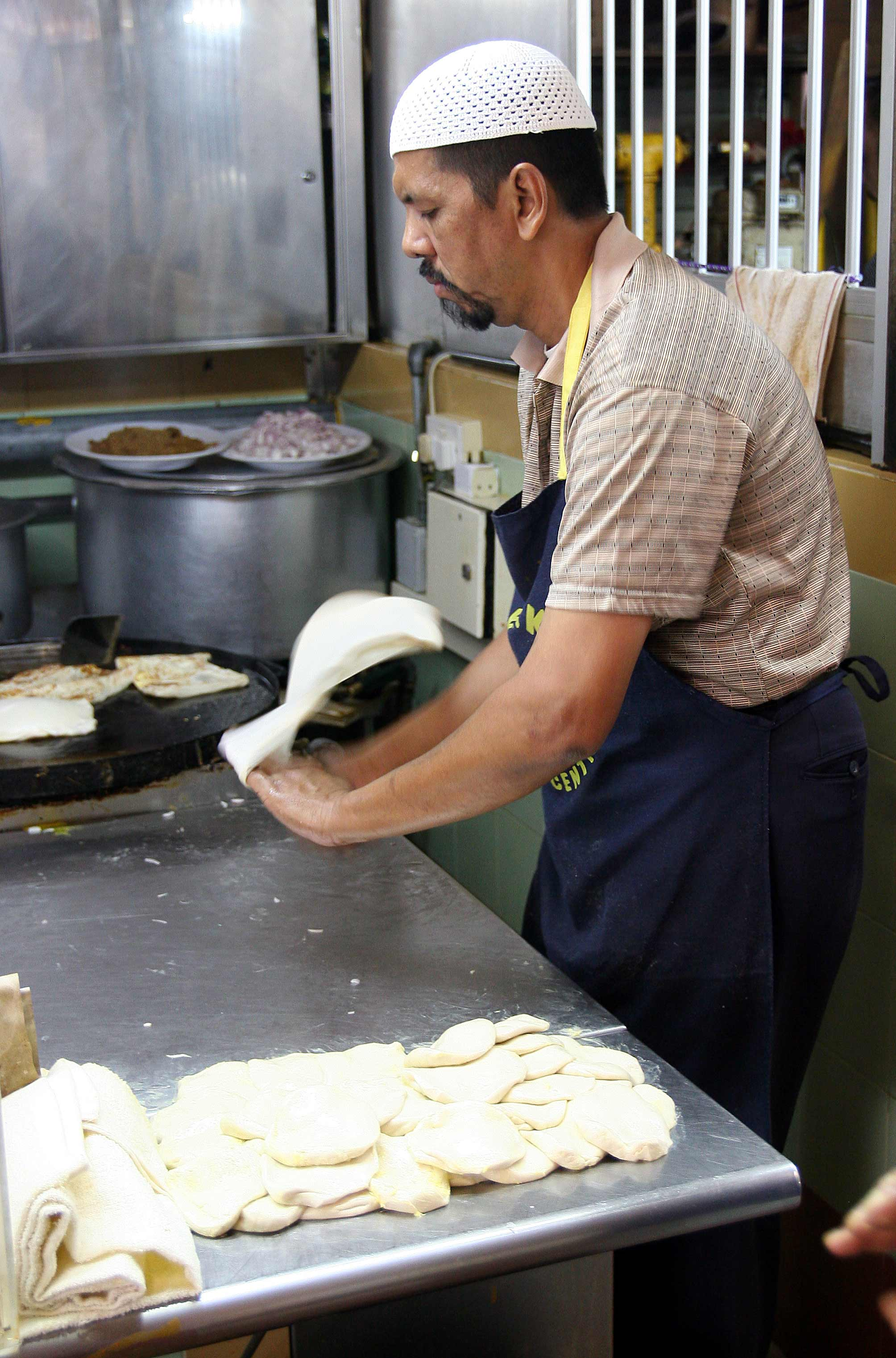
Roti prata being prepared

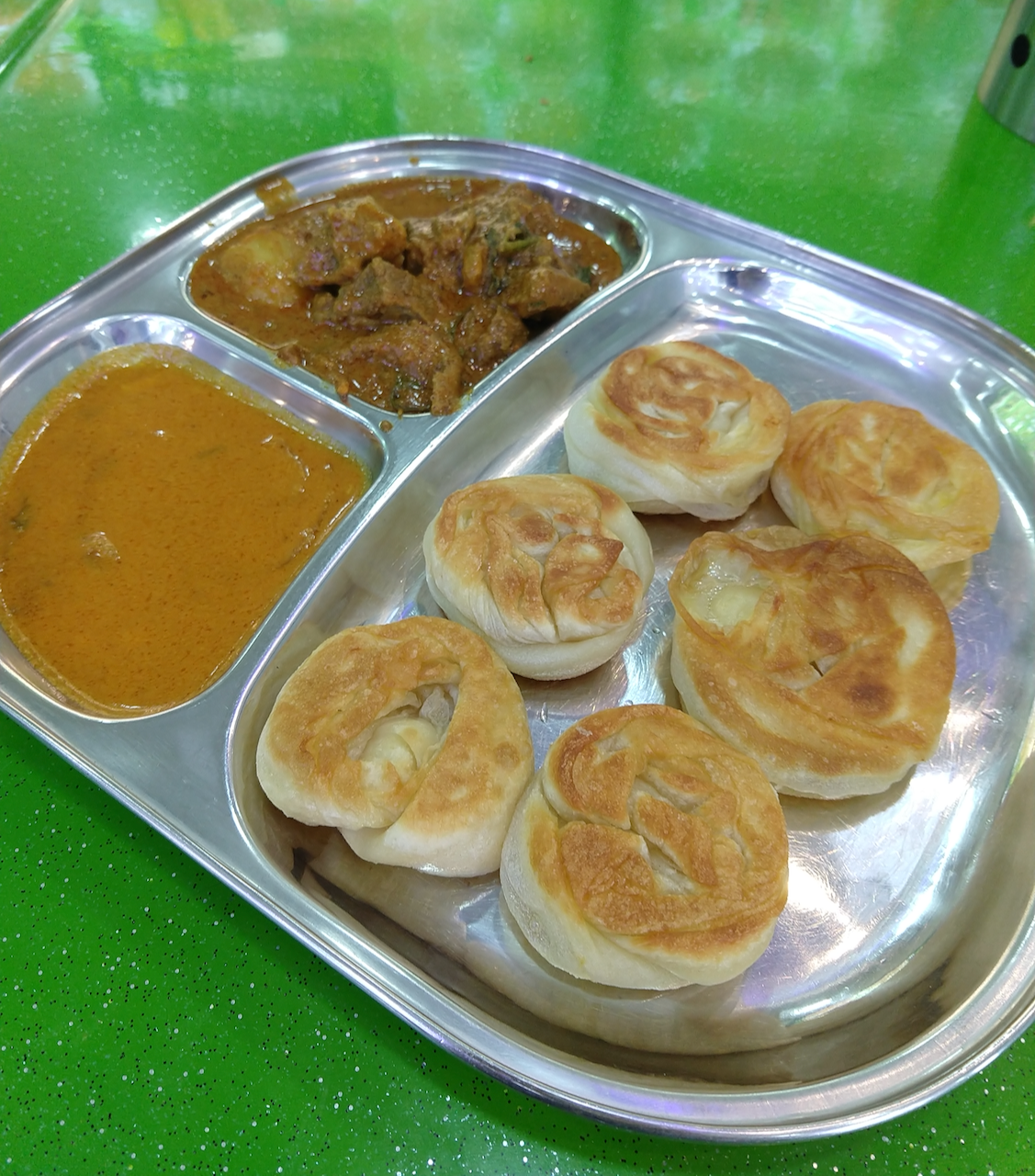
Coin prata is a smaller, crispier version of Singaporean roti prata, found at Kampong Glam.

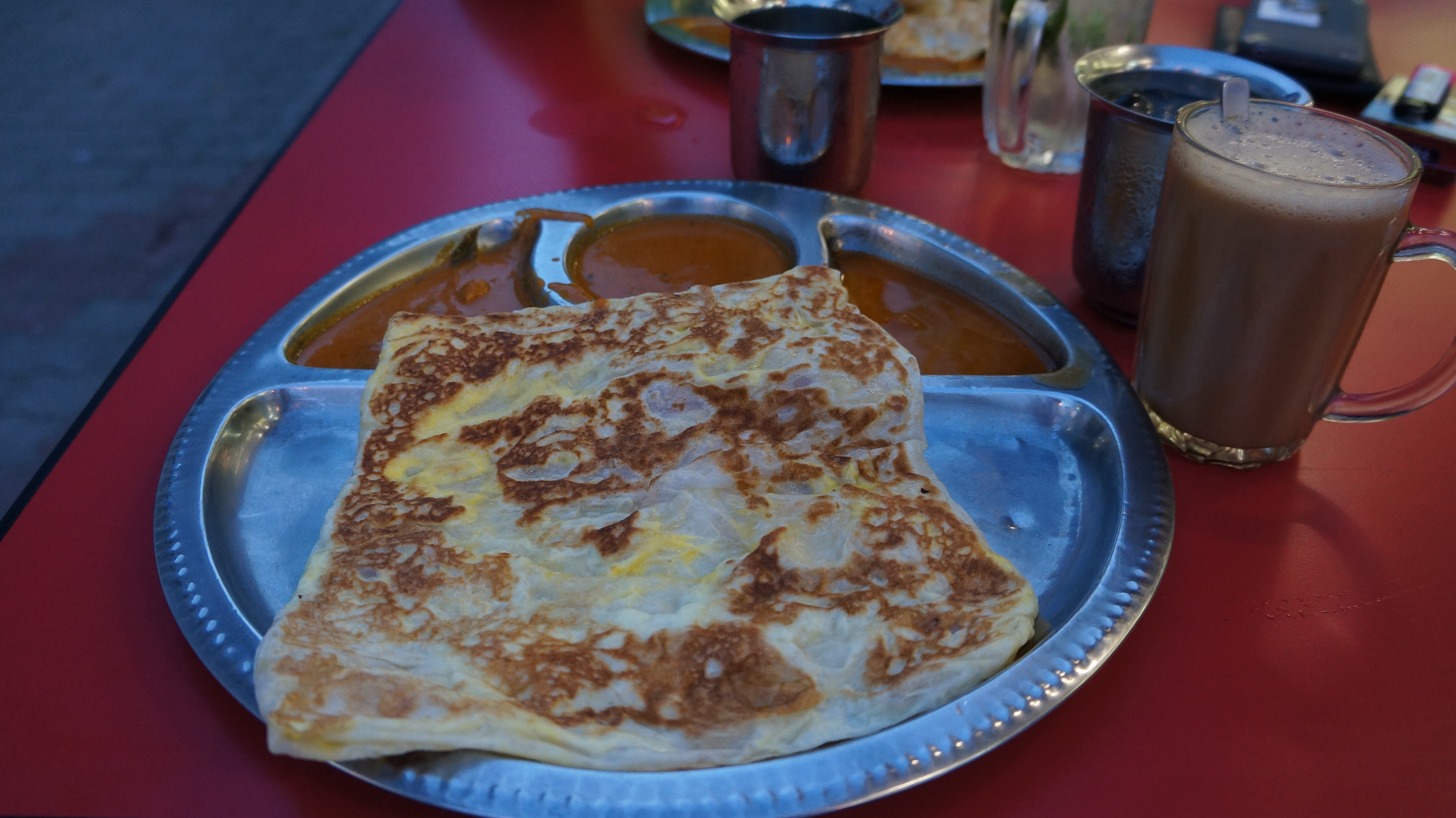
Roti telur with teh tarik, a frothy, milk-infused steeped black tea poured back and forth repeatedly to the ideal serving temperature

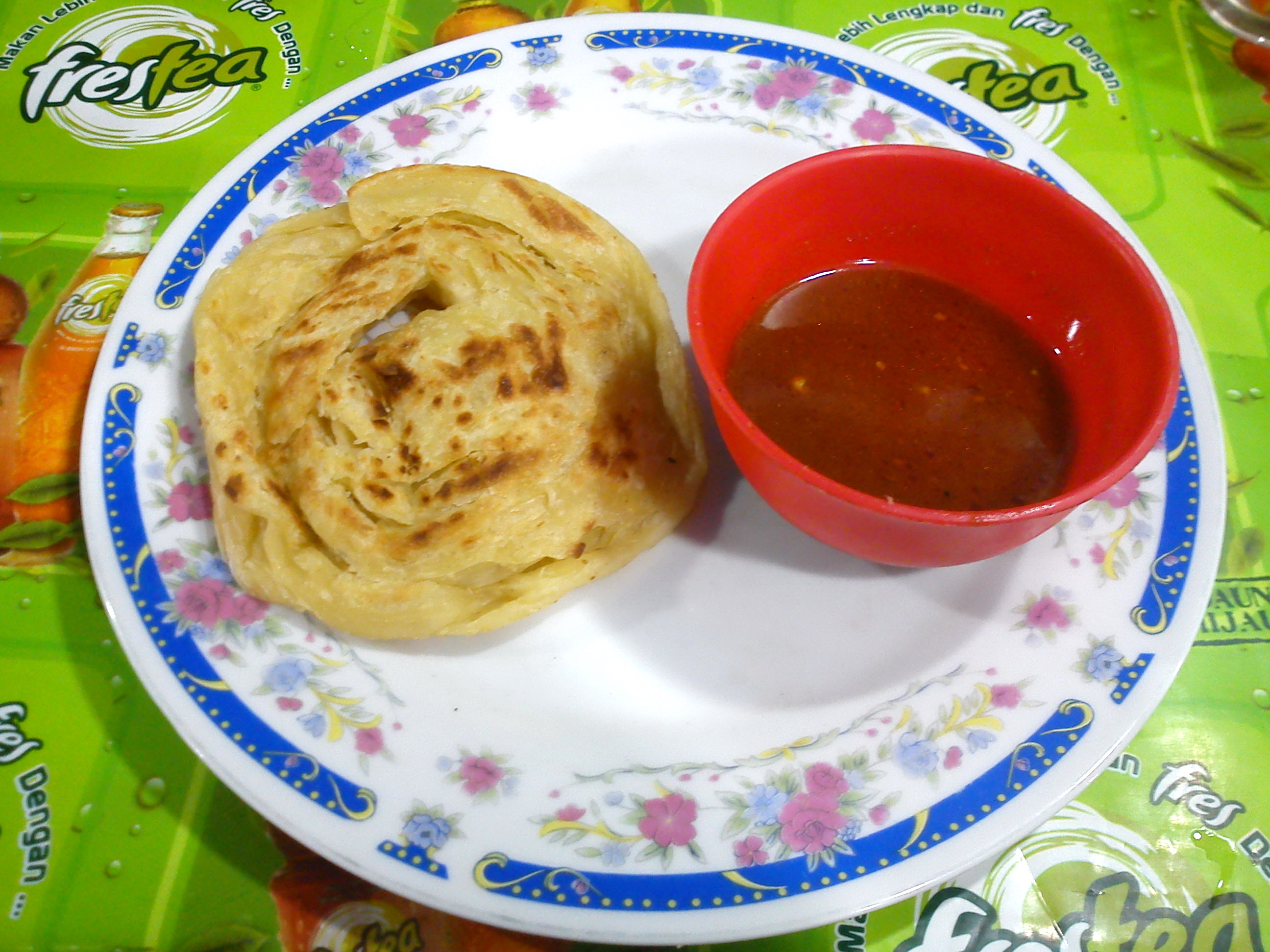
Roti canai served with mutton curry in Bukittinggi, West Sumatra, Indonesia

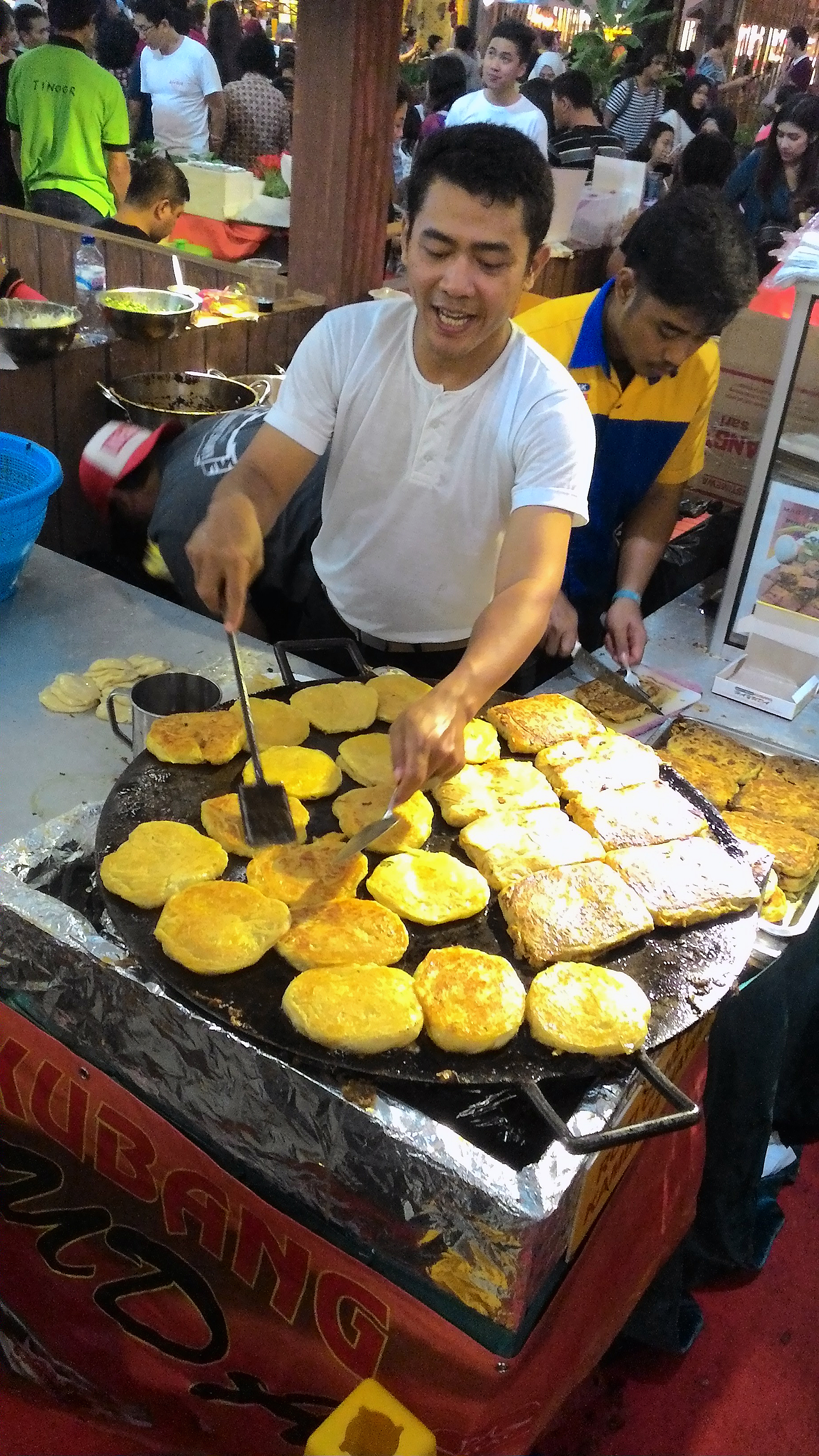
Martabak kubang and roti cane preparation in a Minang foodstall in Indonesia

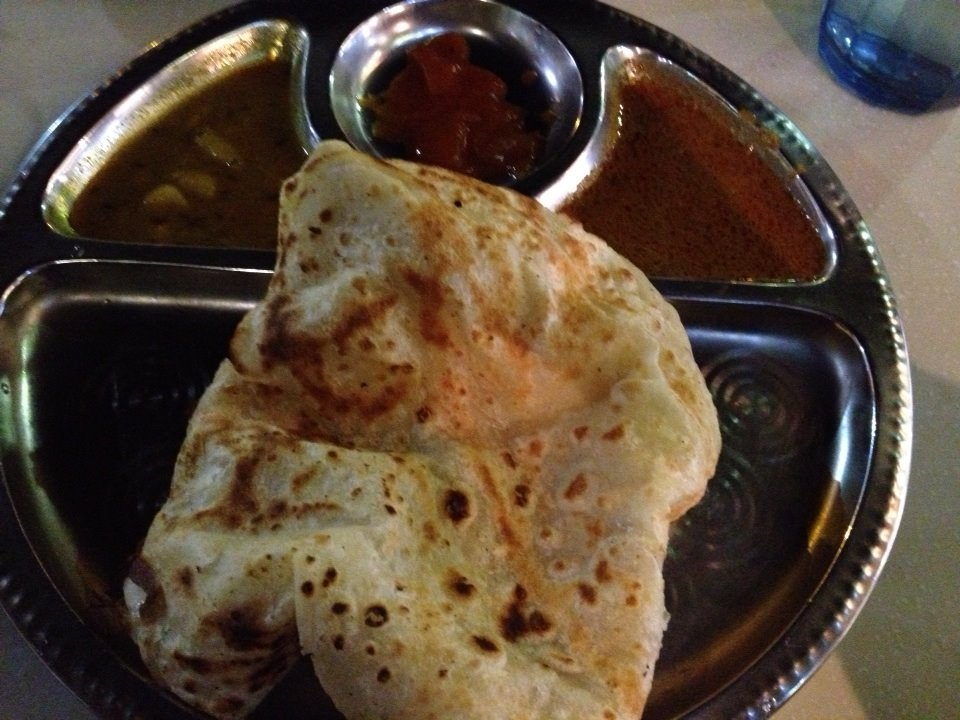
Roti canai with two curries on a stainless steel thali

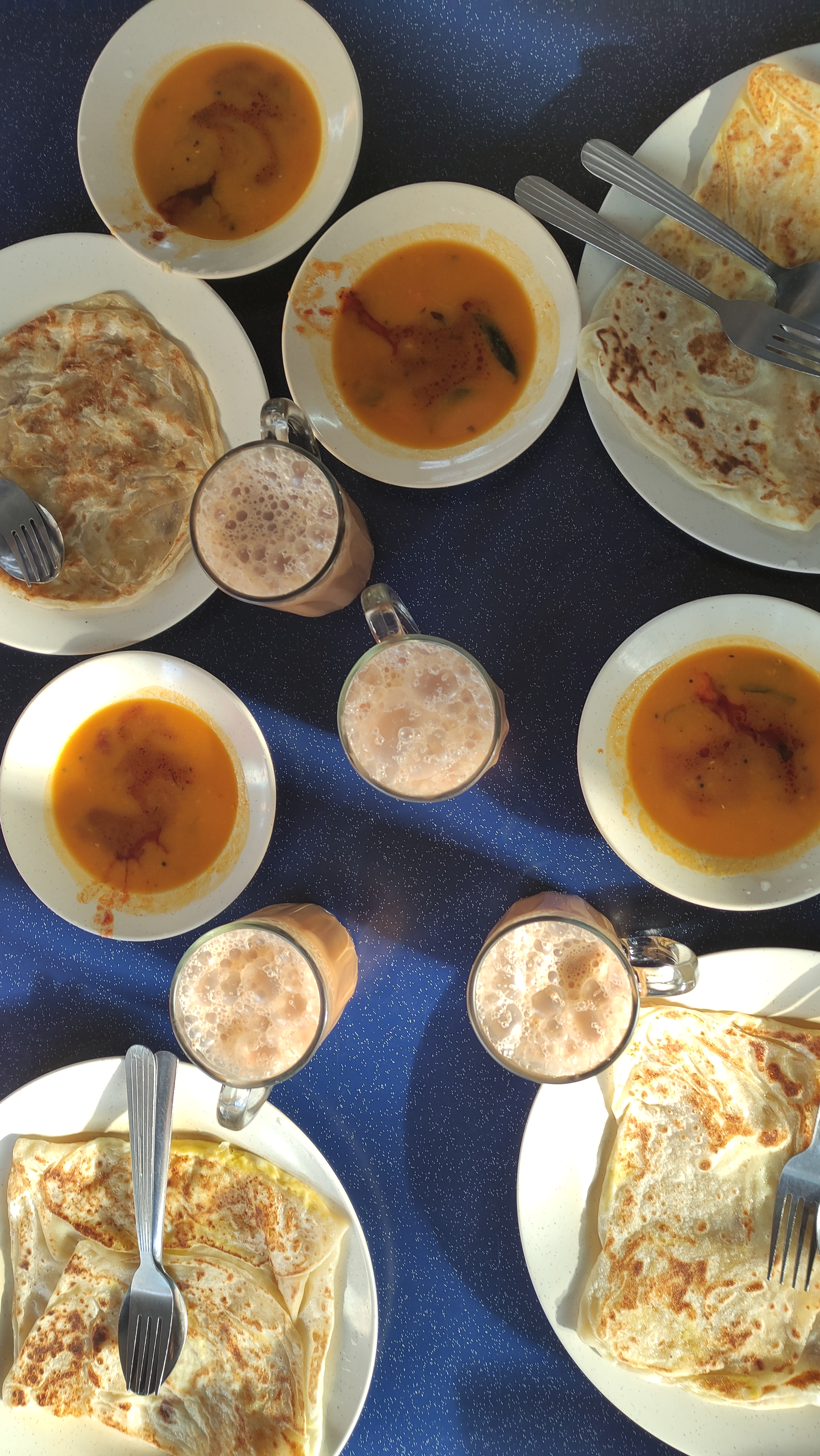
Roti canai served with teh tarik is a typical Malaysian breakfast.

== See also ==
- Crêpe
- Goat roti
- Roti jala
- Naan
