= Acehnese cuisine =

Cuisine of the Acehnese people

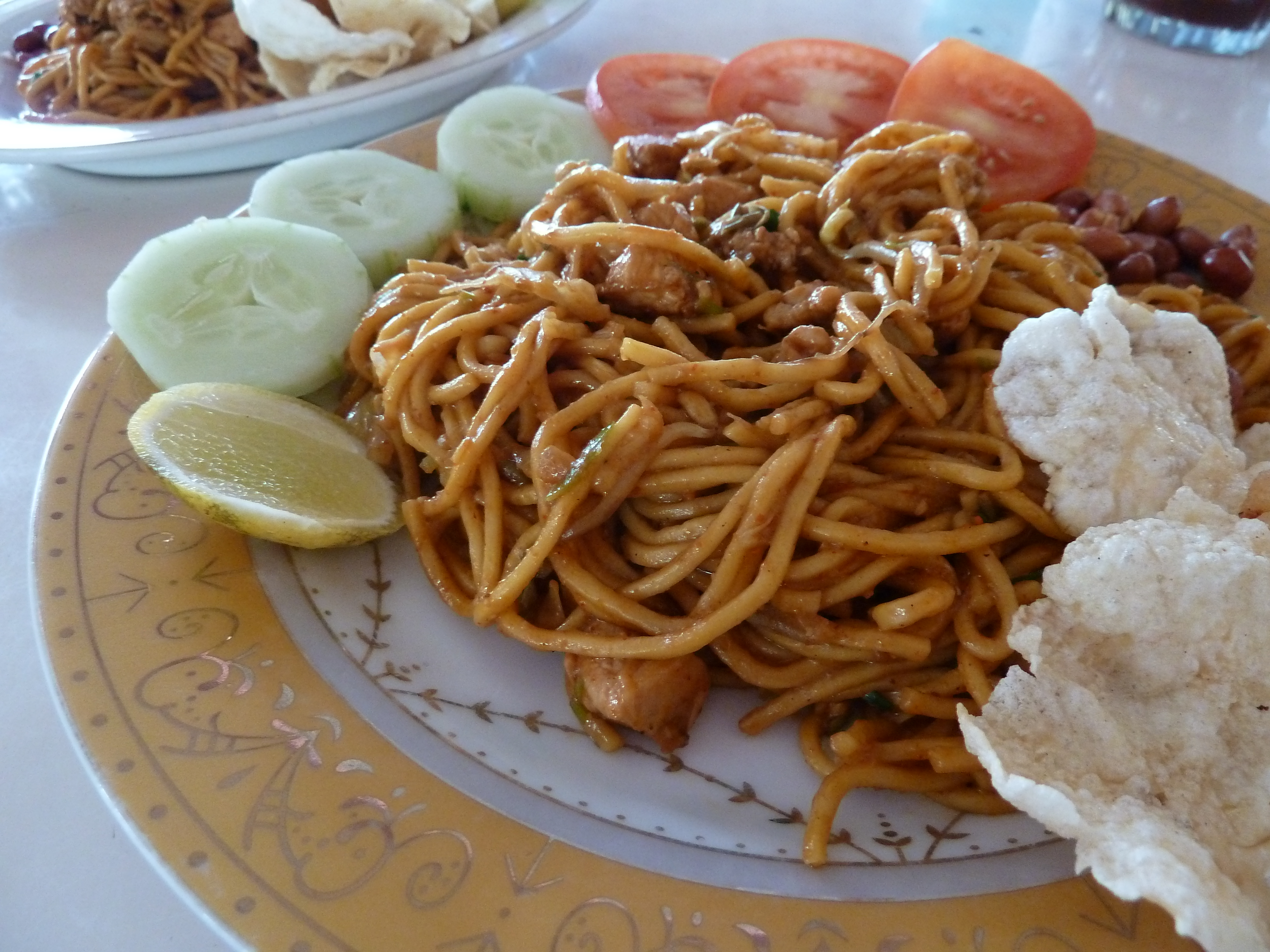
Mi aceh, common Acehnese fried noodles in Indonesia.

Acehnese cuisine is the cuisine of the Acehnese people of Aceh in Sumatra, Indonesia. This cuisine is popular and widely known in Indonesia. Arab, Persian, and Indian traders influenced food culture in Aceh although flavours have substantially changed their original forms. The spices combined in Acehnese cuisine are commonly found in Indian and Arab cuisine, such as ginger, pepper, coriander, cumin, cloves, cinnamon, cardamom, and fennel.

A variety of Acehnese food is cooked with curry or coconut milk, which is generally combined with meat such as buffalo, beef, goat meat, lamb, mutton, fish, or chicken. Several Aceh dishes can trace their origins to India, such as roti canai, which was derived from Indian flatbread.

Acehnese cuisine

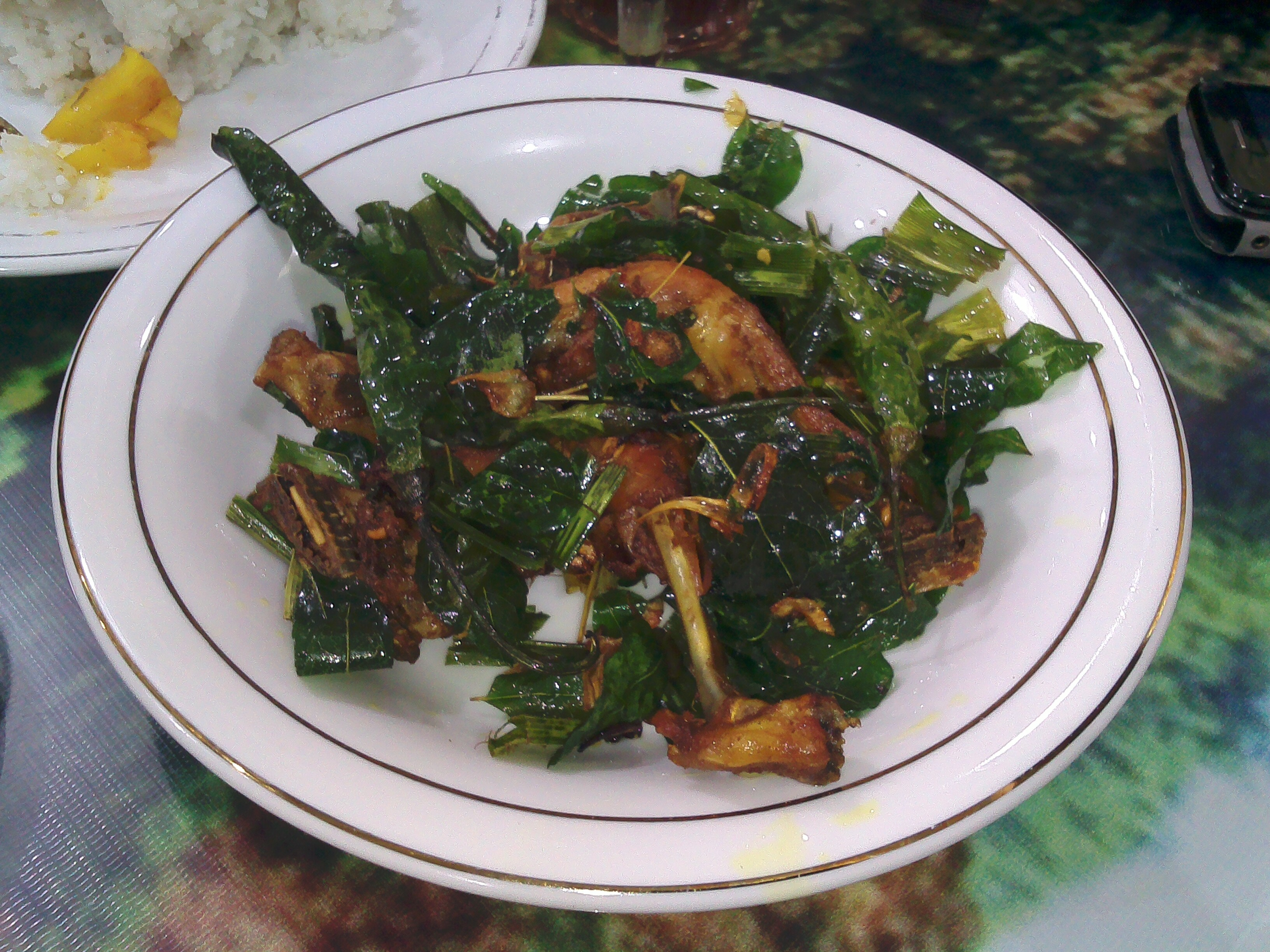
Ayam tangkap

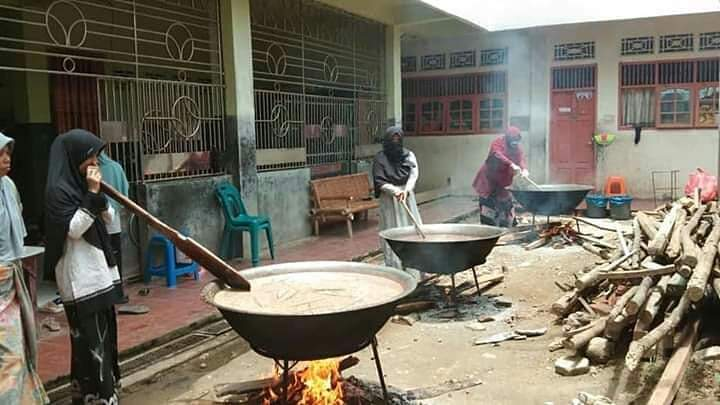
Bubur asyura

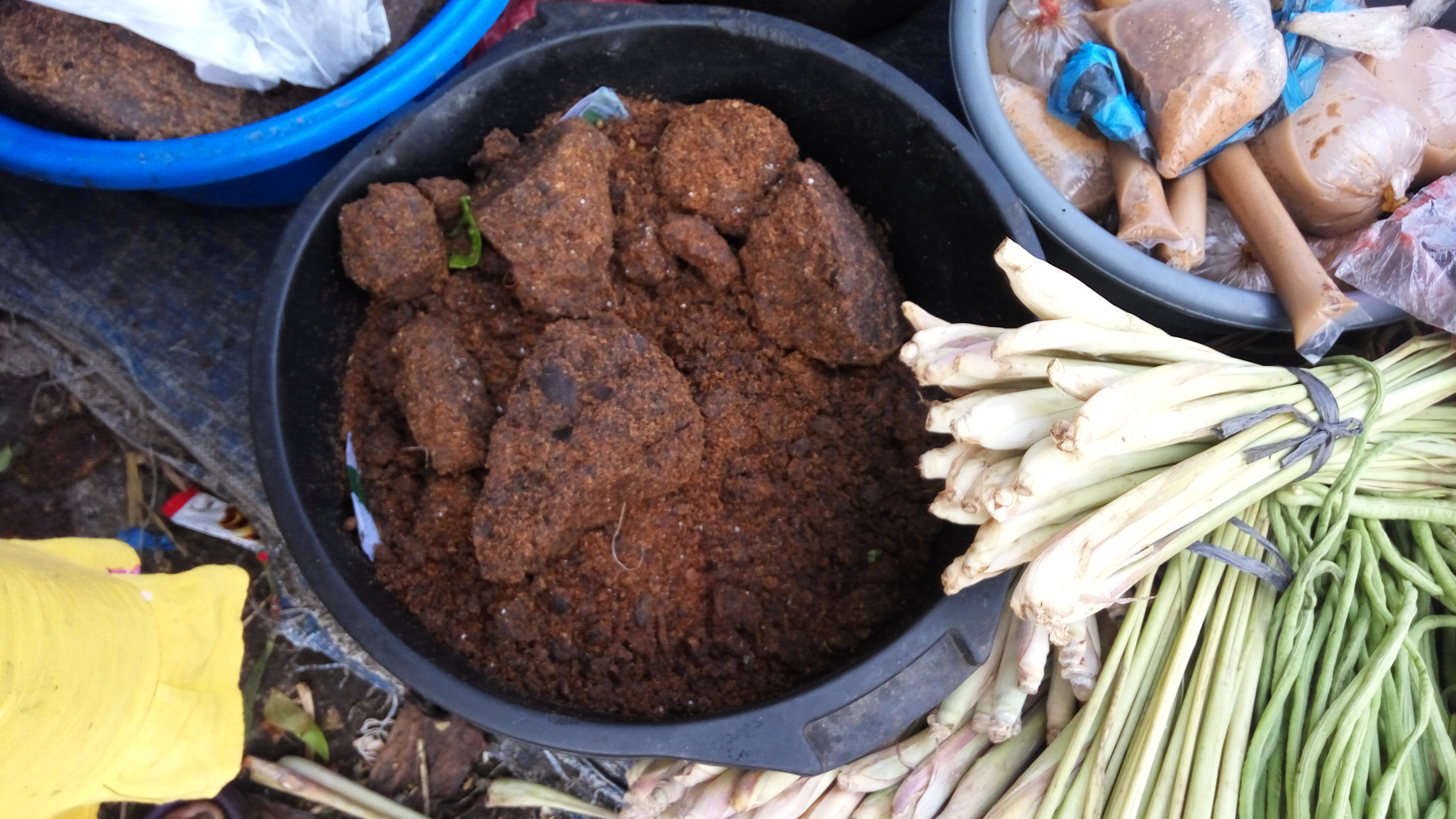
Kuwah pliek u

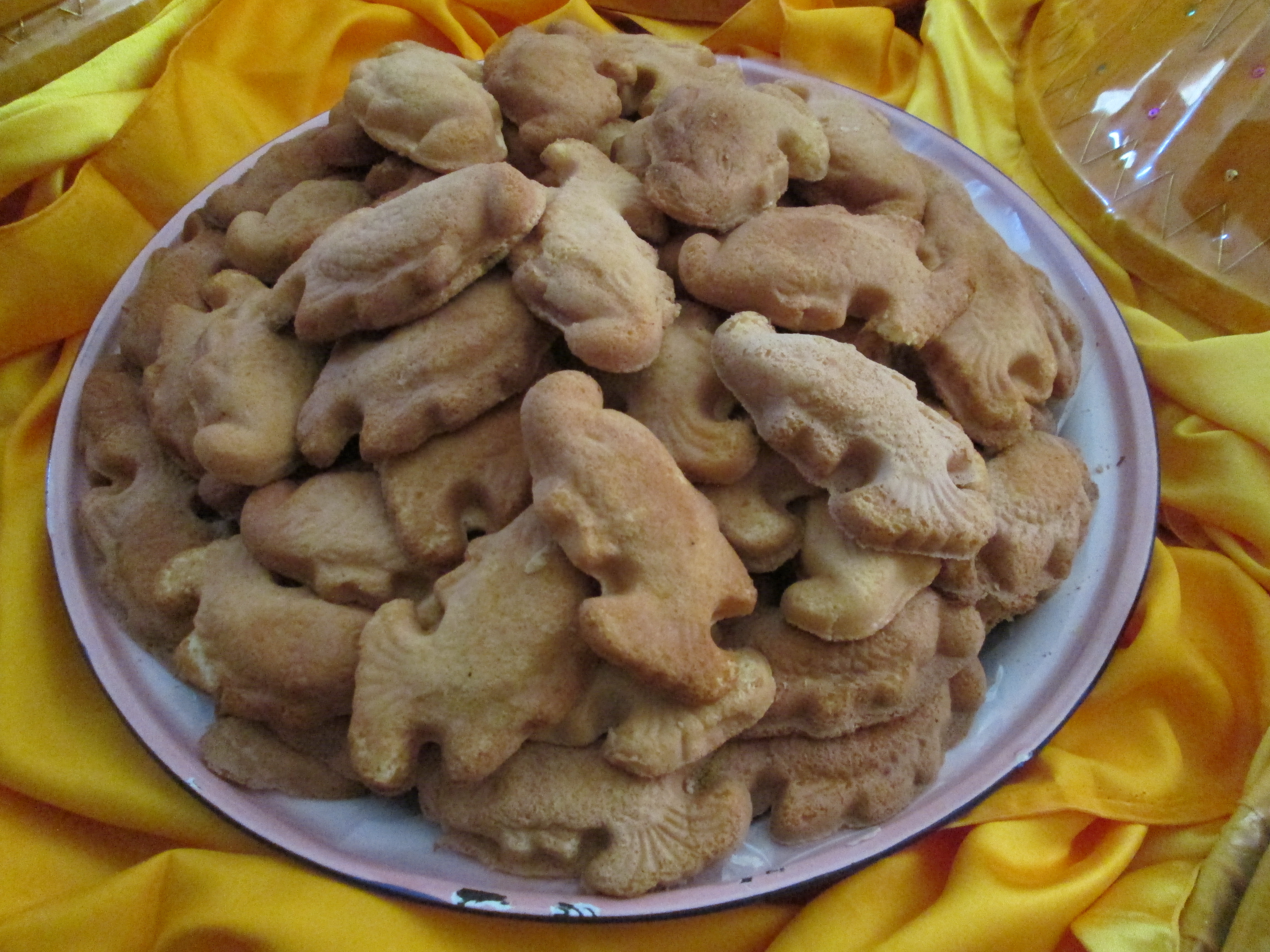
Bhôi

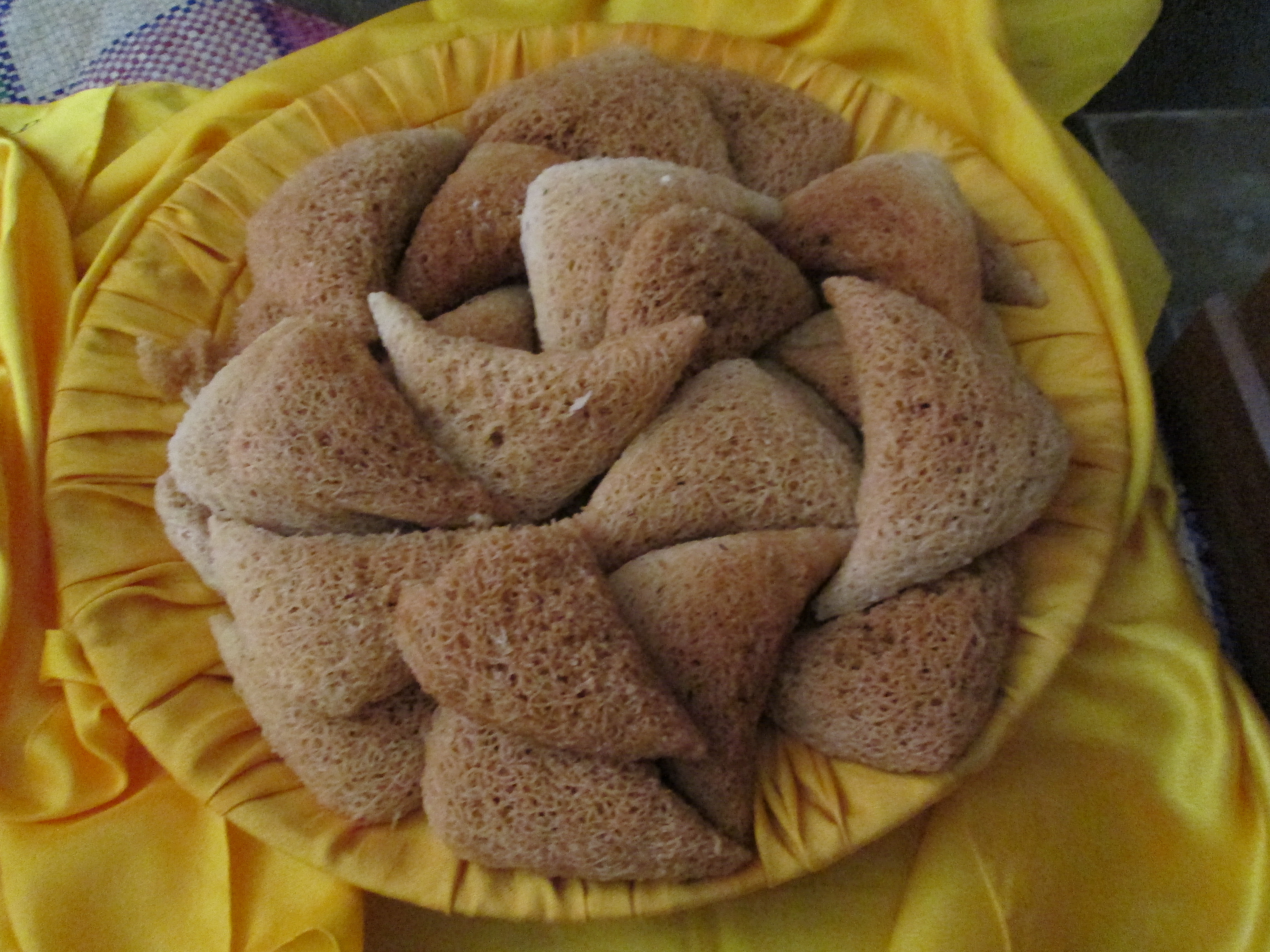
Keukarah

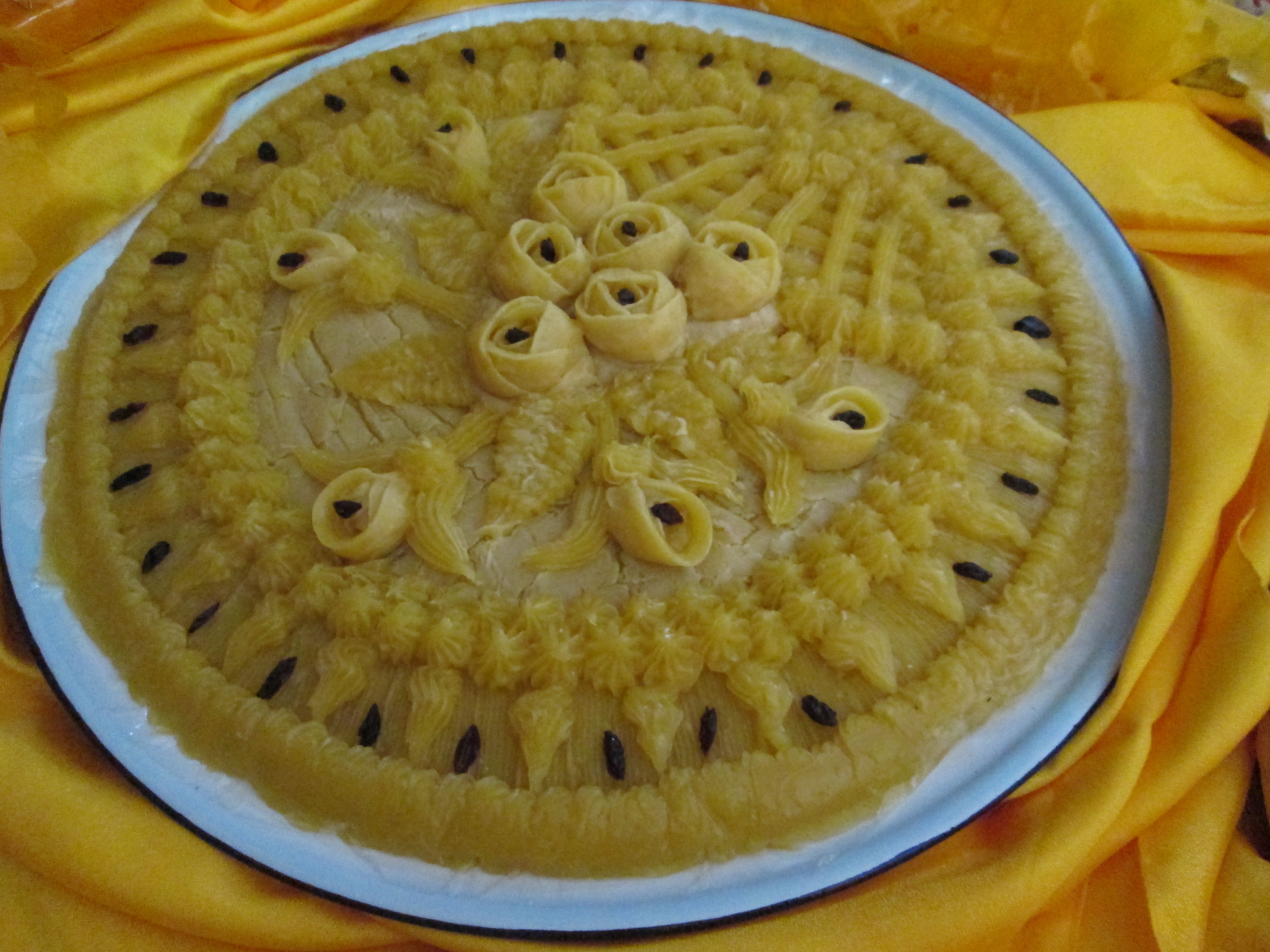
Meuseukat

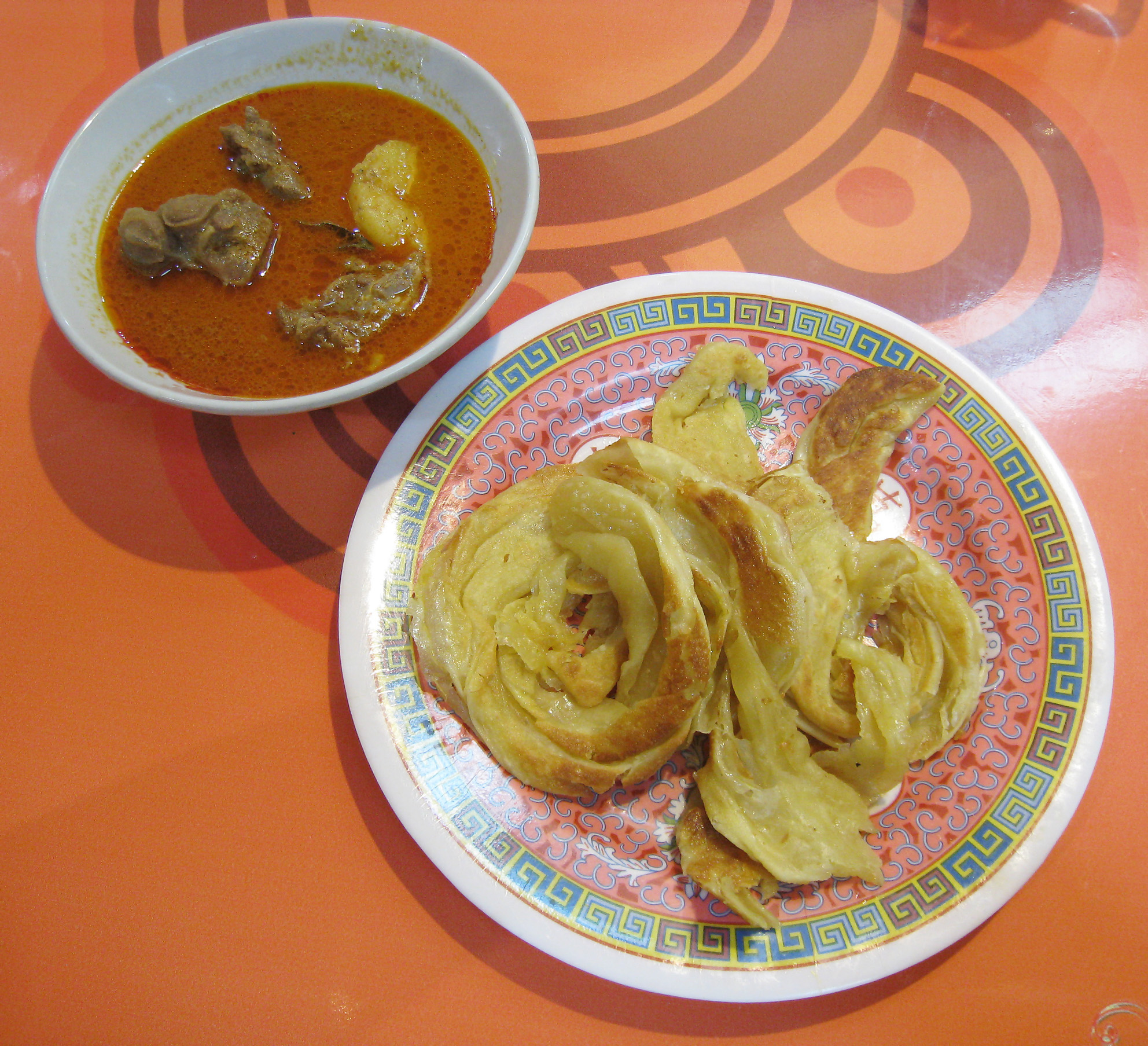
Roti cane kari kambing

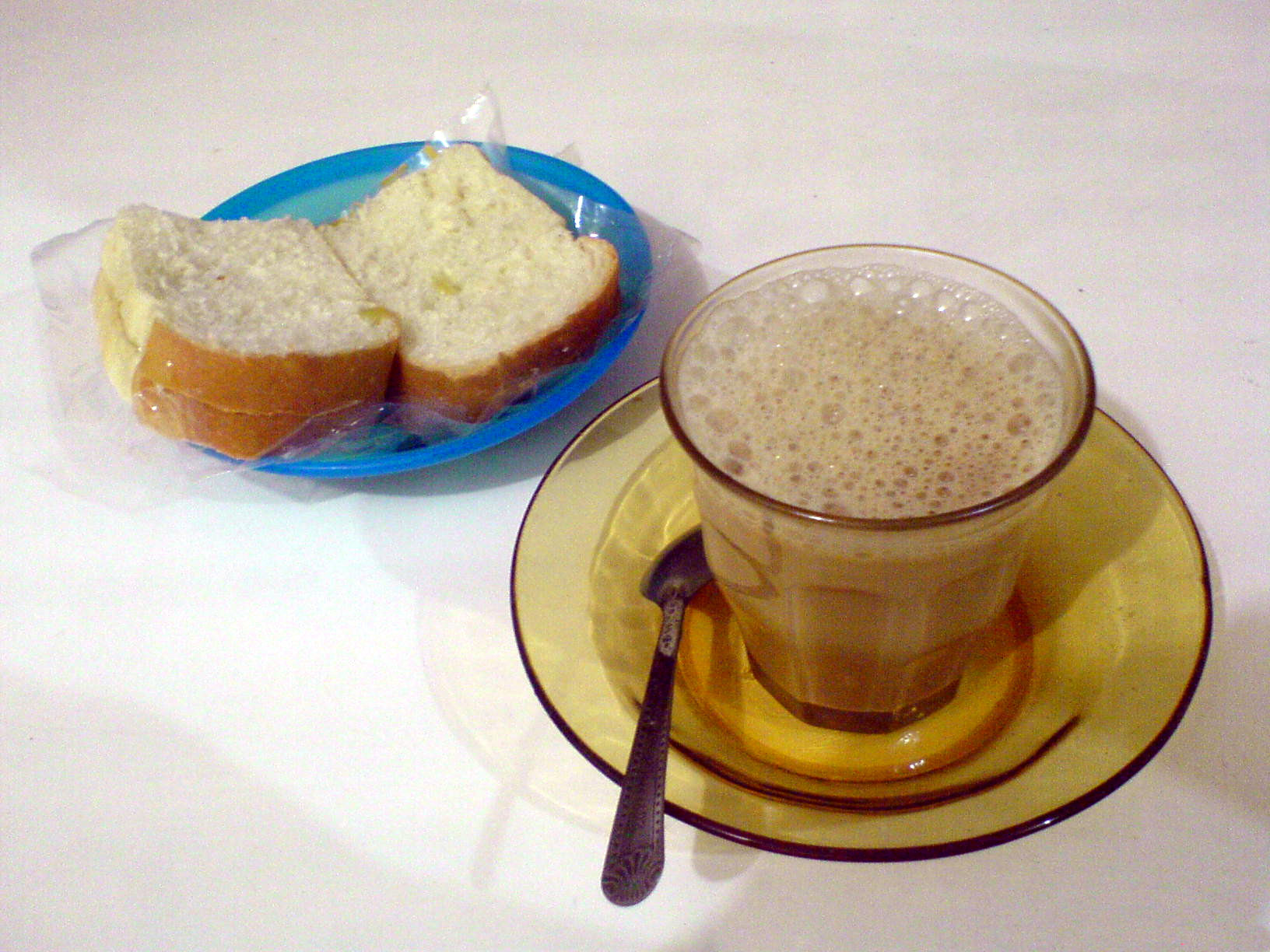
Kopi sanger

== List of Acehnese foods ==
=== Spices ===
- Asam sunti, a condiment made of star fruit and salt.
- Pliëk-u, a condiment made from coconut dregs.

=== Dishes ===
- Ayam tangkap, traditional fried chicken served with leaves such as temurui leaves and pandan leaves that are roughly chopped and fried crispy.
- Gulai, curry dish with main ingredients might be poultry, goat meat, beef, mutton, various kinds of offal, fish and seafood, and also vegetables such as cassava leaves and unripe jackfruit.
- Gulai ayam, chicken curry.
- Gulai kepala ikan, fish head curry.
- Kanji asyura, porridge made from grains.
- Kanji rumbi, rice porridge, similar to bubur ayam.
- Ketupat, rice dumpling made from rice packed inside a diamond-shaped container of woven palm leaf pouch.
- Keumamah, fish dish of Euthynnus affinis or Katsuwonus pelamis.
- Kuwah beulangong, mutton or goat curry.
- Kuwah eungkôt yèe, shark gulai cooked using herbs and spices that are very distinctive, such as temurui leaves and makrut lime leaves.
- Kuwah iték, duck curry.
- Kuwah pliëk-u, gulai-like dish cooked using oilcake, melinjo, long beans, peanuts, papaya leaves, cassava leaves, kecombrang bamboo shoots, snails, and spices.
- Kuwah udeuëng, shrimp curry.
- Martabak, stuffed pancake or pan-fried bread, sometimes filled with beef and scallions.
- Martabak aceh, Acehnese-style of martabak, that shaped like roti canai and served with curries.
- Masam keu’euëng, sour and spicy dish.
- Mi aceh, curried spicy noodle dish with rich spices.
- Mi bangladesh, heavily curried instant noodle dish.
- Mi caluk, noodle dish served with a splash of thick spicy sauce made from a mixture of tomato, chili pepper or chili sauce, coconut milk, ground peanuts, spiced with shallot, garlic, lemongrass and citrus leaf, and served with pieces of vegetables, sliced cucumber and krupuk.
- Mi kari, curry noodle dish.
- Mi rebus, Acehnese-style of boiled noodle dish.
- Nasi biryani, Acehnese-style of flavoured rice dish cooked or served with mutton, chicken, vegetable or fish curry.
- Nasi goreng aceh, fried rice with rich spices akin to mie aceh.
- Nasi gurih, steamed rice cooked in coconut milk and spices dish.
- Nasi kari, rice dish served with curry.
- Roti cane, a thin unleavened bread with a flaky crust, fried on a skillet with oil and served with condiments or curry.
- Roti jala, pretty dish that looks like a lace doily due to the way it is made and usually served with curry dishes.
- Sambai asam udeuëng, sour and spicy shrimp.
- Sate matang, a satay variant made of goat meat.
- Sie reuboh, stew made of beef or water buffalo with spices.

=== Snacks and desserts ===
- Apam, a traditional cake of steamed dough made of rice flour, coconut milk, yeast and palm sugar, usually served with grated coconut.
- Bhôi, Acehnese cake.
- Keukarah, traditional cake made from a mixture of flour and coconut milk with bird nest shaped.
- Meuseukat, dodol-like cake made of pineapple.
- Pulôt, traditional cake made of sticky rice and turmeric.
- Roti tisu, thinner version of the traditional roti canai.
- Timphan, steamed banana dumpling that consists of glutinous rice flour, ground banana and coconut milk.

=== Beverages ===
- Kopi aceh, an Acehnese traditional coffee.
- Kopi gayo, a coffee made from arabica coffee variety.
- Kopi sanger, a coffee made of mixture of black coffee, condensed milk and sugar.
- Kopi tarik, a coffee, dark roasted with margarine and sugar, which is sweetened with condensed milk and pulled to froth it up.
- Teh tarik, a hot milk tea beverage.

== See also ==
- Cuisine of Indonesia
- List of Indonesian dishes
- Acehnese people
- Malay cuisine
- Minangkabau cuisine
