= Mamak stall =

Type of food stall in Southeast Asia

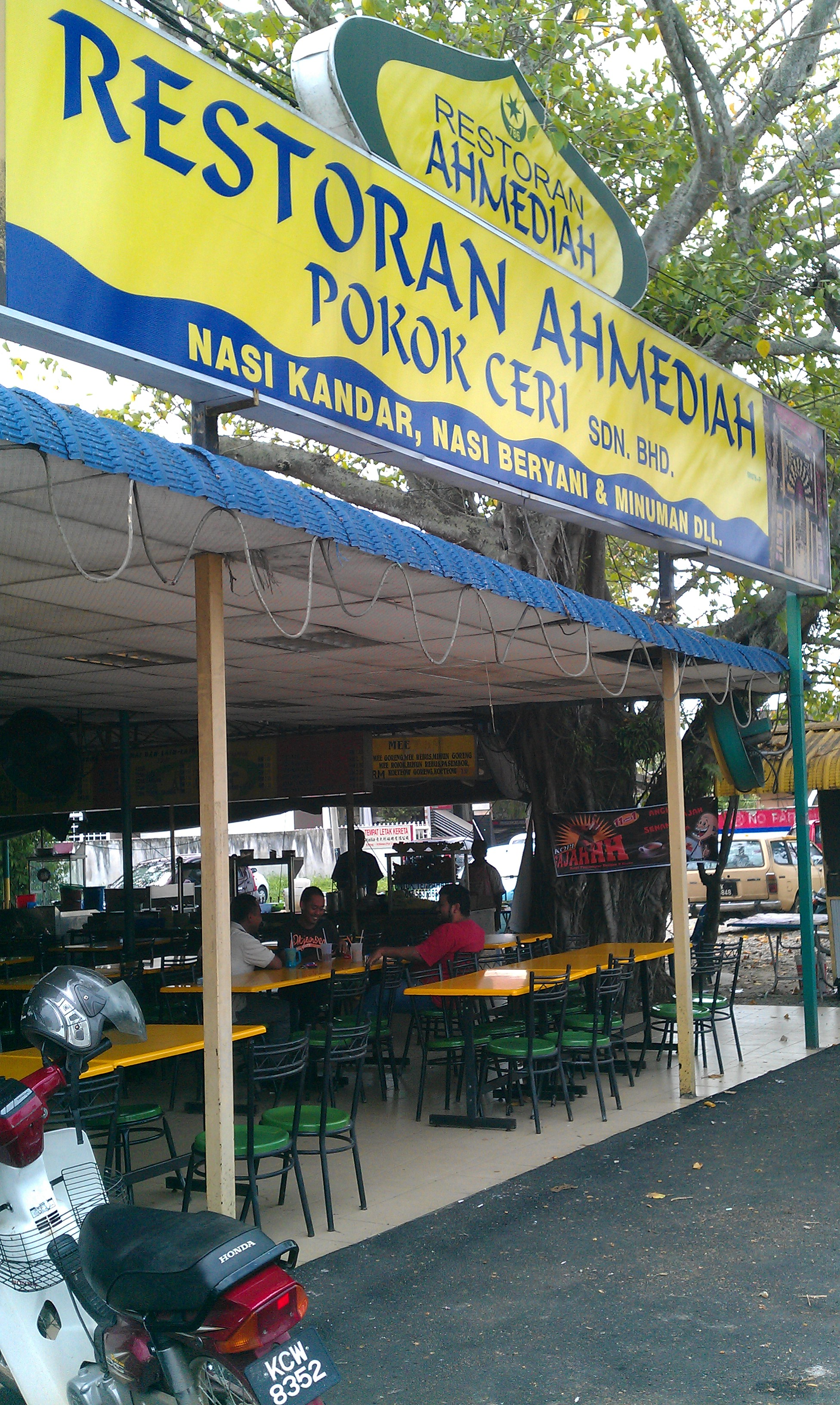
A mamak stall in Alor Setar, Kedah, Malaysia

Mamak stalls are indoor and open-air food establishments found in Southeast Asia, especially in Malaysia and Singapore, that typically serve food derived from Tamil Muslim cuisine, often combined with culinary elements unique to maritime Southeast Asia.

== History ==
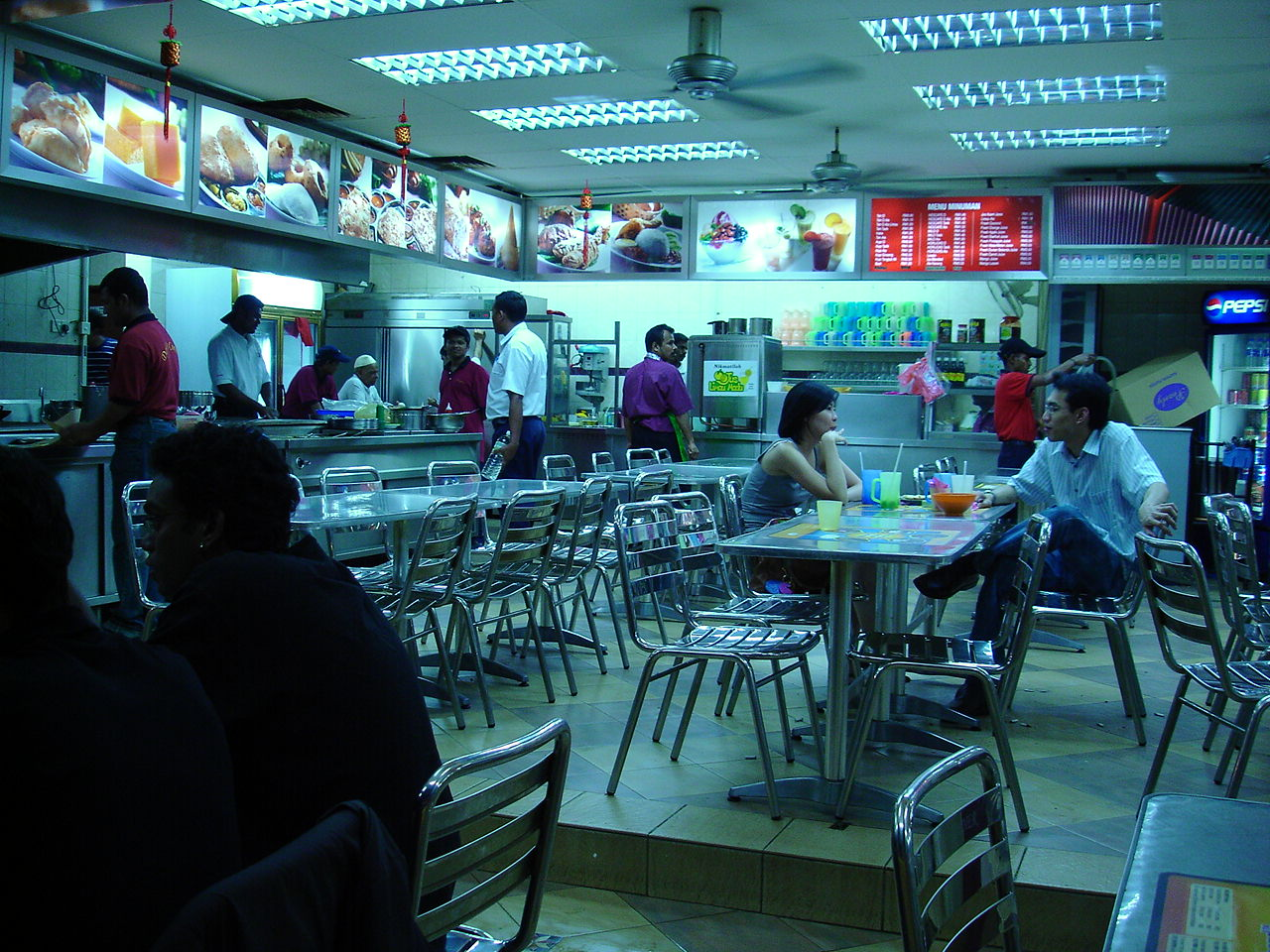
Certain Mamak stalls, such as this example in Kuala Lumpur, may remain open 24 hours a day.

Mamak stalls originate from Tamil Muslims, most of whom migrated from South India and Ceylon (modern-day Sri Lanka) to the Malay Peninsula and other locations in Southeast Asia centuries ago. They are regarded as part of the "Malaysian Indian/Singaporean Indian" community, also known as "Straits Indian". Archaeological findings in the Bujang Valley of Kedah suggest a trade relationship with India as early as the 1st to 5th century C.E. An inscription dated 779 AD that refers to the trade relationship between the Tamilakam and the region was found in Nakhon Si Thammarat, Southern Thailand, dating to the Nakhon Si Thammarat Kingdom.

The word "mamak" is from the Tamil term for maternal uncle, or maa-ma. In Singapore and Malaysia, it is used by children as an honorific to respectfully address adults such as shopkeepers. Although the origins of the word are benign and neutral, it can sometimes be used as a derogatory term and insult against the South Asian Muslim community in Malaysia and Singapore, and therefore its usage is generally avoided outside of specifically referring to mamak stalls.

Mamak stalls and Hindu stalls are alike except that mamaks, who are Muslims, do not serve pork but do serve beef, whereas Hindus serve neither beef nor pork. There are also similar stalls run by local Malays.

== Design ==
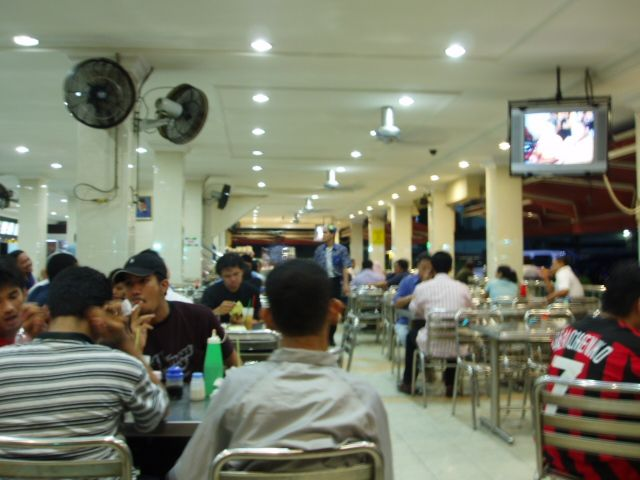
Hanging televisions and misting fan systems are commonplace features at Mamak stalls.

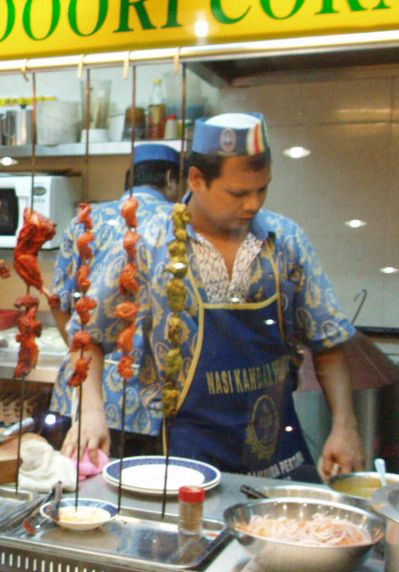
A Mamak cook preparing tandoori chicken

Mamak stalls' affordable food and unpretentious atmosphere tend to create a casual dining atmosphere. Newer mamak stalls have more of a café aspect, usually being well lit and furnished with stainless steel tables. Some are outfitted with large flat screen televisions, or even projectors, so that patrons can catch the latest programs or live matches as they dine. Some mamak stalls also provide free Wi-Fi service. Despite these innovations, many modern mamak stalls attempt to retain their predecessors' open air dining atmosphere by setting up tables on a patio, the shoplot's walkway, or even on the street.

== Fare ==
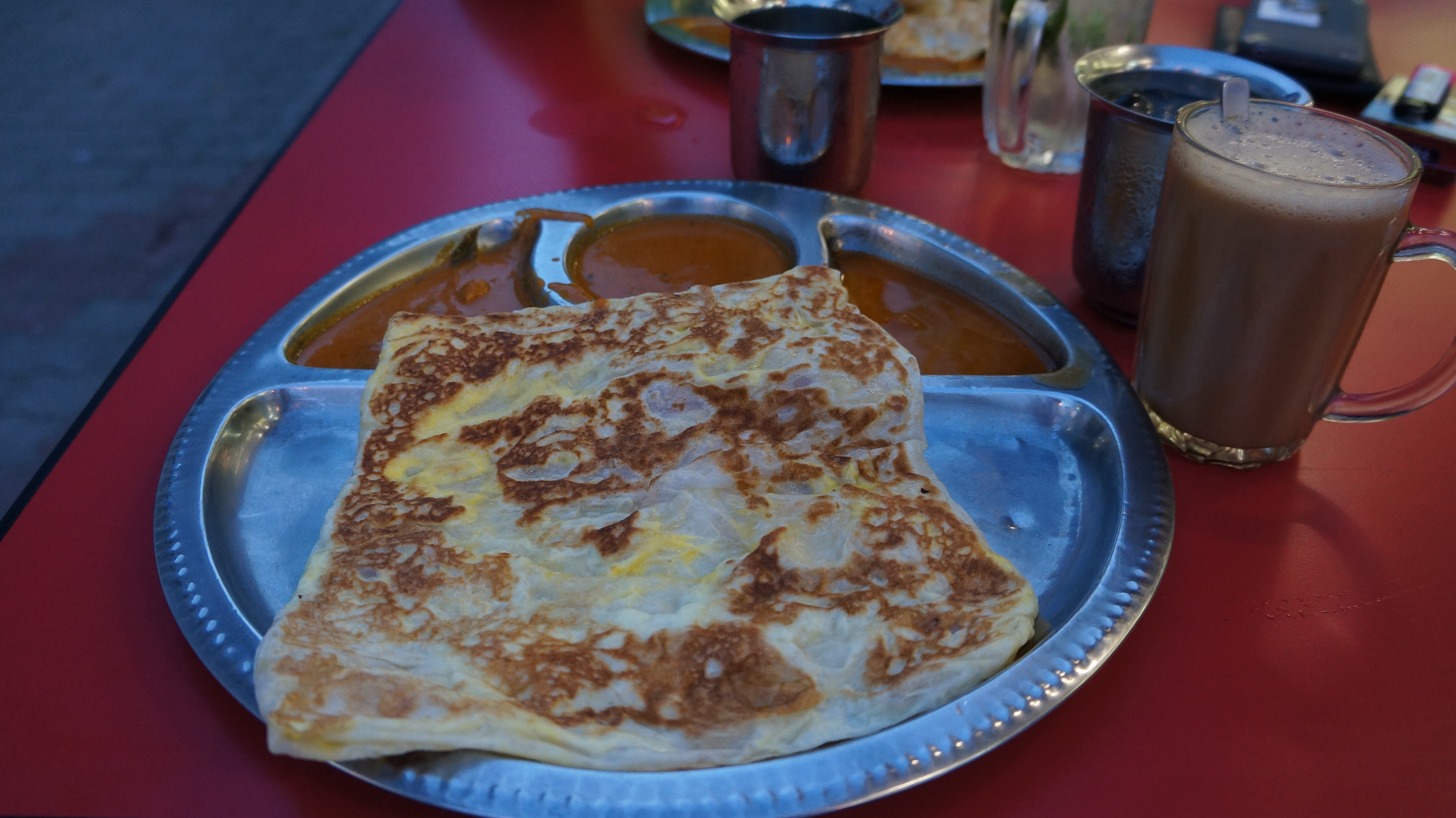
A classic mamak dish of roti telur and teh tarik

A mamak stall usually offers different varieties of roti canai to eat and teh tarik, coffee, Milo, Horlicks, and soft drinks to drink. Most mamak stalls also serve several varieties of rice, such as nasi lemak and nasi goreng, as well as noodle dishes such as mee goreng (fried noodles). Some stalls also offer satay and Western dishes.

A typical Mamak stall will offer the following dishes and beverages, though this differs from stall to stall:

- Roti canai (Malaysia and Brunei)
  - Roti prata (Singapore)
- Teh tarik
- Half-boiled eggs
- Goat's milk
- Murtabak
- Thosai (also known as a dosa)
- Chapati
- Nasi kandar
- Nasi briyani (or biryani)
- Nasi lemak
- Nasi goreng
- Maggi goreng
- Mee goreng
- Mie goreng
- Mee rebus
- Bihun goreng
- Kwetiau goreng
- Char kway teow
- Indomie
- Pasembur
- Mamak rojak
- Indian rojak
- Ayam goreng (fried chicken)
- Maggi sup
- Bihun sup
- Sup kambing (goat soup)
- Sup ayam (chicken soup)
- Sup tulang
- Roti tissue
- Roti bakar
- Kaya toast
- Roti bawang
- Roti bom
- Roti cheese
- Roti Planta
- Roti lisang
- Roti telur
- Roti sardin
- Roti jantan
- Roti Milo
- Naan with tandoori chicken
- Puri, or poori
- Papadum
- Ais kosong
- Limau ais kosong
- Nescafe
- Neslo (Nescafe with milo)
- Horlicks
- Barli
- Limau ais
- Kopi
- Milo ais
- Milo kosong
- Milo panas
- Milo 'O'
- Sirap
- Sirap limau
- Sirap bandung
- Teh ais (iced tea)
- Teh halia
- Teh 'O' ais
- Teh 'O' ais limau
- Teh 'O' panas
- Teh 'O' kosong

== Malay tom yam stall ==
To attract more customers, some mamak restaurants have added an extra stall in their restaurant, operated by either an ethnic Malay from Malaysia or one from southern Thailand; these stalls are known as "Malay tom yam stalls". They provide different food options, such as:

- Tom yam
- Nasi paprik
- Nasi goreng kampung (village-style fried rice)
- Nasi goreng cina (Chinese fried rice)
- Nasi goreng USA ["Westernised" fried rice, hence "USA", served with prawn (u-dang), squid (s-otong), and chicken (a-yam)
- Nasi masak merah (red-cooked rice)
- Nasi pattaya (despite the name, the dish originated in Malaysia)
- Telur bistik (stuffed omelette)
- Sayur campur (mixed vegetables)
- Ikan pedas (spicy fish)
- Nasi lala (clam rice)

== See also ==
- Kopi tiam – similar to mamak stall but with Chinese cuisine
- Punjabi dhaba – in Pakistan and India
- Warung – street stalls in Indonesia
