= Pasembur =

Malaysian salad dish

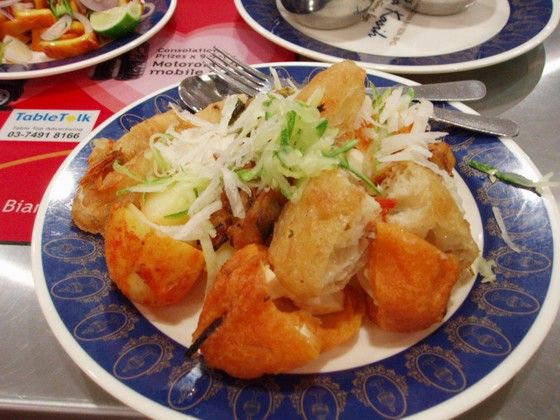
- Alternative names: Rojak mamak
- Type: Salad
- Place of origin: Malaysia
- Region or state: Penang
- Associated cuisine: Malaysian
- Main ingredients: Cucumbers, potatoes, beancurd, turnip, bean sprouts, seafood (i.e., prawns, crab, squid)

Pasembur (Northern Malay: Pasemboq; Jawi: ڤسمبور) is a Malaysian salad consisting of shredded cucumber, potatoes, bean curd, turnip, bean sprouts, prawns, fritters, spicy fried crab, fried squid or other seafood, and dressed with a sweet and spicy nut sauce.

The term pasembur is peculiar to northern Peninsular Malaysia, especially the state of Penang. In other parts of the country, the term rojak mamak is commonly used.

== See also ==
- List of salads
- Mamak stall
