= Roti tissue =

Indian-influenced sweet flatbread

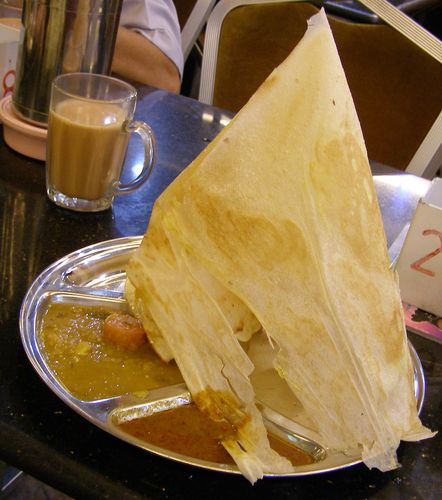
- Roti Tissue and a glass of Teh tarik
- Alternative names: Roti tisu, tissue prata, roti helikopter
- Type: Dessert
- Associated cuisine: Malaysia and Singapore
- Created by: Tamil Muslim in Malaya

Roti tissue, roti tisu, or tisu prata is a sweet flatbread often sold at Mamak stalls in Malaysia and Singapore. It is also known as "roti helikopter" (helicopter bread). Roti tisu is a thinner and crispier version of the traditional roti canai or roti prata. It is as thin as a piece of 40–50 cm round-shaped tissue.

Roti tisu is available at most local Mamak stalls in Malaysia and Singapore and may be coated with sweet substances, such as sugar and kaya (jam), or eaten with condiments such as ice cream.

The popularity of roti tissue has spread to neighbouring Indonesia, where it is found as street food in areas with significant Malays and Indian-Indonesian communities.

== See also ==
- Mamak stall
