= Mee goreng =

Stir-fried noodle dish in Malay-speaking countries

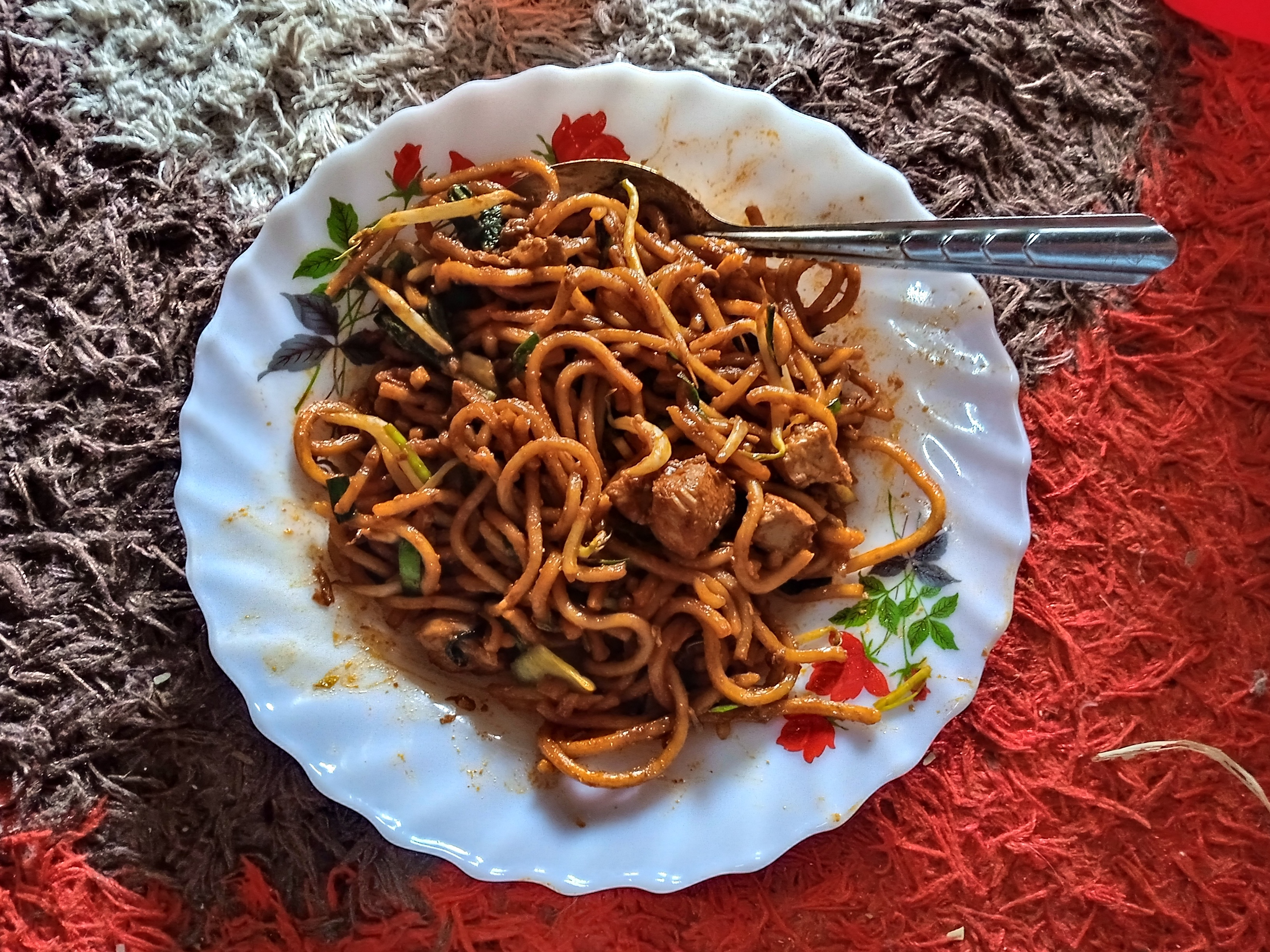
- A plate of mee goreng.
- Course: Main
- Region or state: Brunei, Malaysia, Singapore
- Main ingredients: Noodles
- Variations: Mee goreng mamak, mee sotong, maggi goreng

Mee goreng, or mi goreng, refers to fried noodles in the Malay-speaking cultures of several countries, such as the Southeast Asian states of Brunei, Malaysia, and Singapore.

A notable variant, mee goreng mamak is associated with Mamak stalls operated by Muslim Indian communities within the region, and is often spicy in taste.

== Origins ==
Numerous distinct variations of mee goreng may be found in Brunei, Malaysia, and Singapore.

One version is believed to have been developed by Indian immigrants, often of Tamil Muslim origin, who drew influences from other cultures and incorporated them into their cooking. This style of mee goreng is regarded as a dish unique to the region, as it cannot be found in India.

== Preparation ==
There is no standard method of preparing mee goreng or any derivative variant which use other types of noodles, as each dining establishment employs different techniques and ingredients. A typical method may involve stir-frying the noodles with vegetables, eggs, and other ingredients such as tofu and meat. Common ingredients for Indian-style mee goreng may include spices, tomato sauce, potatoes, cabbage, and sweet soy sauce. A slice of lime, usually of the calamansi variety, is often placed at the side of the plate as a garnish.

=== Malaysia ===
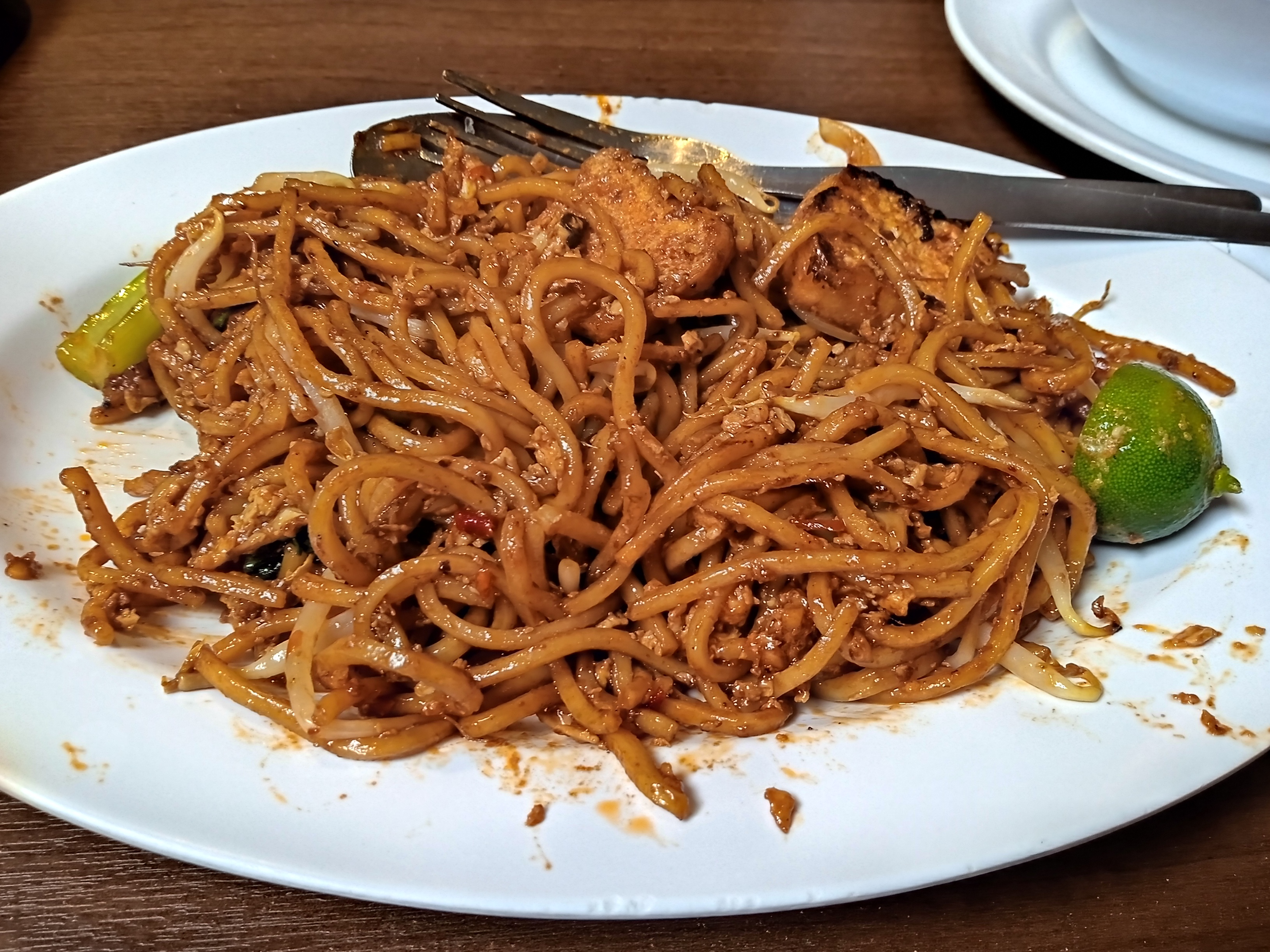
Malaysian mee mamak

In Malaysia, Mamak-style mee goreng is prepared and sold at Mamak stalls around the country. The word mamak is from the Tamil term for maternal uncle; in Malaysia and Singapore, it is traditionally used an honorific to respectfully address shopkeepers or proprietors of dining establishments. Mee goreng mamak is often associated with Indian Muslim cuisine offered at Mamak stalls, and is regarded as a fusion food that incorporates Chinese yellow noodles with seasonings and spices typical of Malay and Indian cuisine.

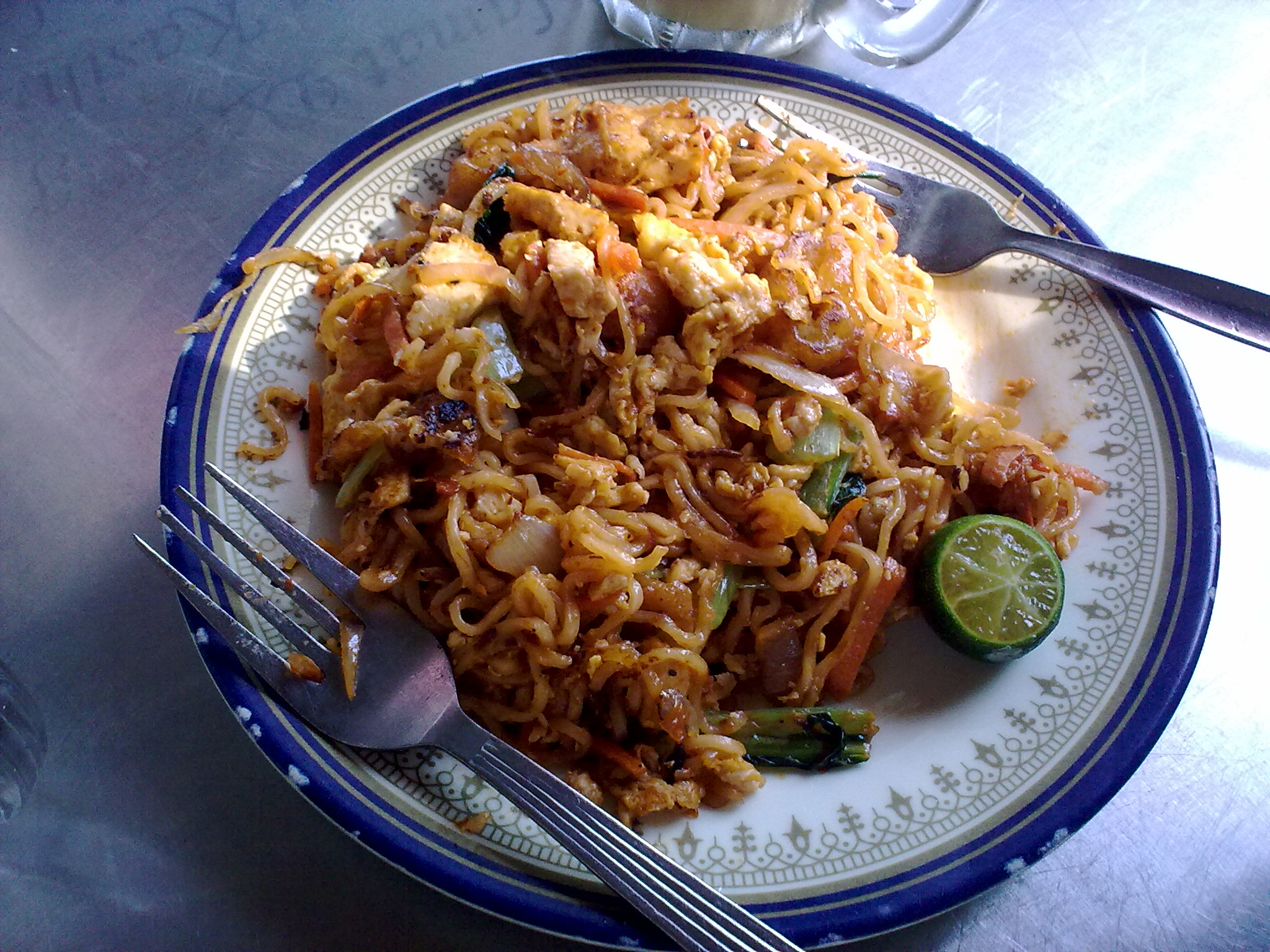
Maggi goreng

Maggi goreng, or Maggi mee goreng, is a variation of Mamak-style mee goreng. It uses Maggi brand of instant noodles, prepared with hot water before stir-frying, instead of fresh yellow noodles.

=== Singapore ===
In Singapore, mee goreng is often associated with cooking typical of Indian Muslim cuisine, known for its frequent use of ingredients such as lamb or mutton. A famous variant developed by restaurateurs of Chinese ethnic origin for their restaurant in Punggol during the 1970s was cooked with seafood, bean sprouts, coriander, and a sambal (spicy chilli relish) sauce made up of twelve herbs and spices.

=== Sri Lanka ===
Mee goreng exists in Sri Lankan cuisine due to historical Malay cultural influences.

== See also ==
- Bihun goreng
- Char kway teow
- Mee siam
- Mee tauhu
- Pad thai
