= Penjor festival =

Cultural festivals in Indonesia

Penjor festivals
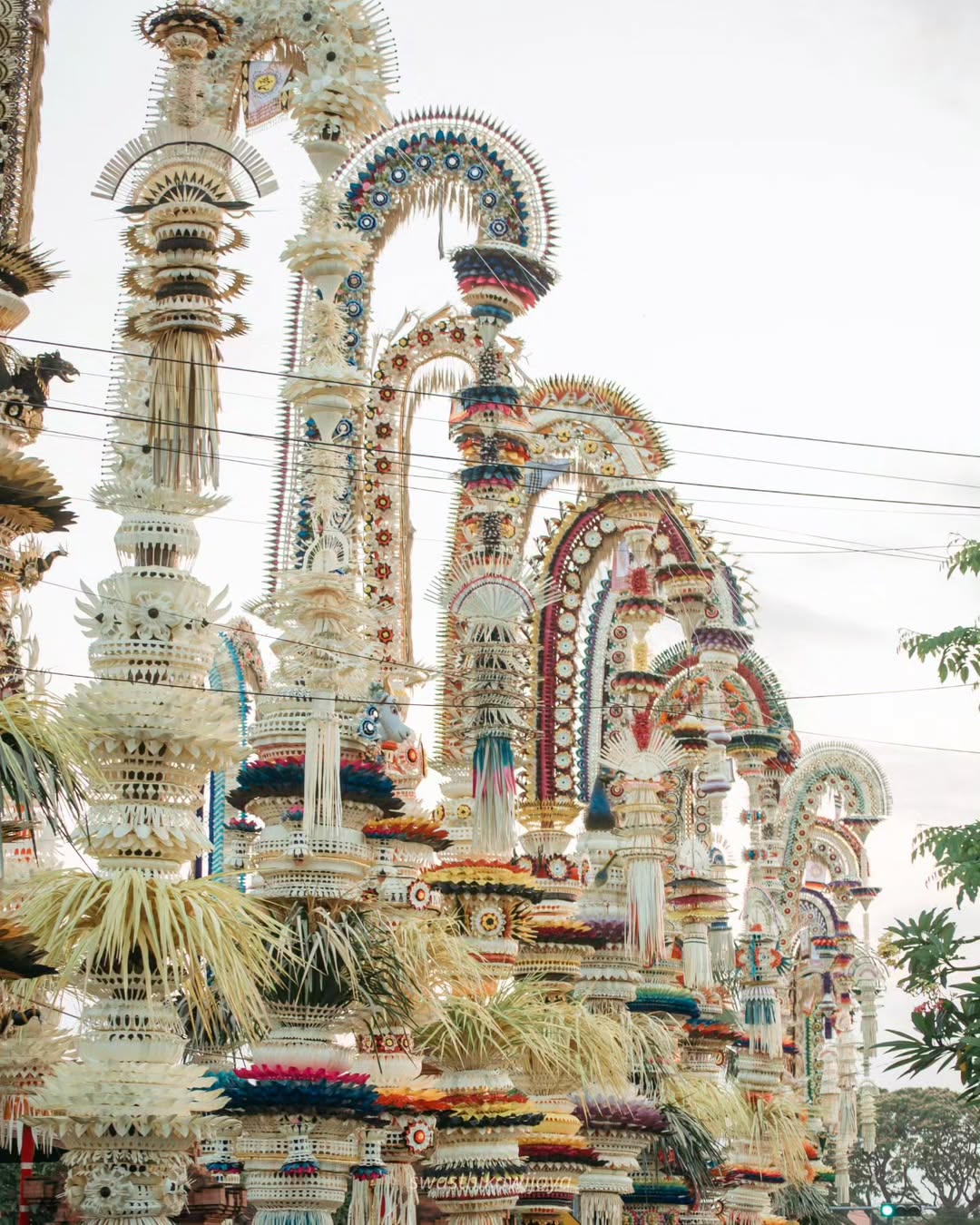
- Penjor Agung lined along the road near Pura Agung Petilan Kesiman (13 October 2024)
- Date: Varies by region
- Frequency: Annual
- Location: Indonesia (primarily Bali)

A penjor festival is a cultural event in Indonesia — especially in Bali and parts of Java — that feature exhibitions, competitions, and artistic presentations of the penjor, a decorated bamboo pole used in Balinese Hindu ritual tradition. While penjor have been central to religious ceremonies for centuries, standalone public festivals dedicated to penjor craftsmanship and symbolism have expanded since the early 21st century.

These festivals aim to preserve traditional craftsmanship, involve youth groups, strengthen community identity, and promote cultural tourism. Major events take place in Badung, Denpasar, Kerobokan, Bangli, Serangan, and occasionally outside Bali, such as in Borobudur, Central Java.

== History and origins ==
A penjor is a tall arched bamboo pole decorated with coconut leaves (janur), rice, fruits, textile ornaments (such as the "Kain Prada Bali"), and symbolic elements. In Balinese Hindu cosmology, the penjor represents Mount Agung, the dwelling place of Ida Sang Hyang Widhi Wasa, and expresses gratitude for prosperity and agricultural abundance. Lontar manuscripts such as Usana Bali, Jayakasunu, and Basuki Stawa describe the penjor as a symbol of cosmic balance, divine generosity, and the harmonious relationship between humans, nature, and the divine.

== Development of modern festivals ==
=== Bangli Penjor Festival ===
One of the most widely reported penjor festivals is held in Bangli, where hundreds of penjor are displayed during regional celebrations. Participation involves numerous desa adat, each presenting distinctive designs. Media describe the event as celebrating cultural continuity and the symbolic triumph of dharma over adharma.

=== Borobudur Penjor Festival (Central Java) ===
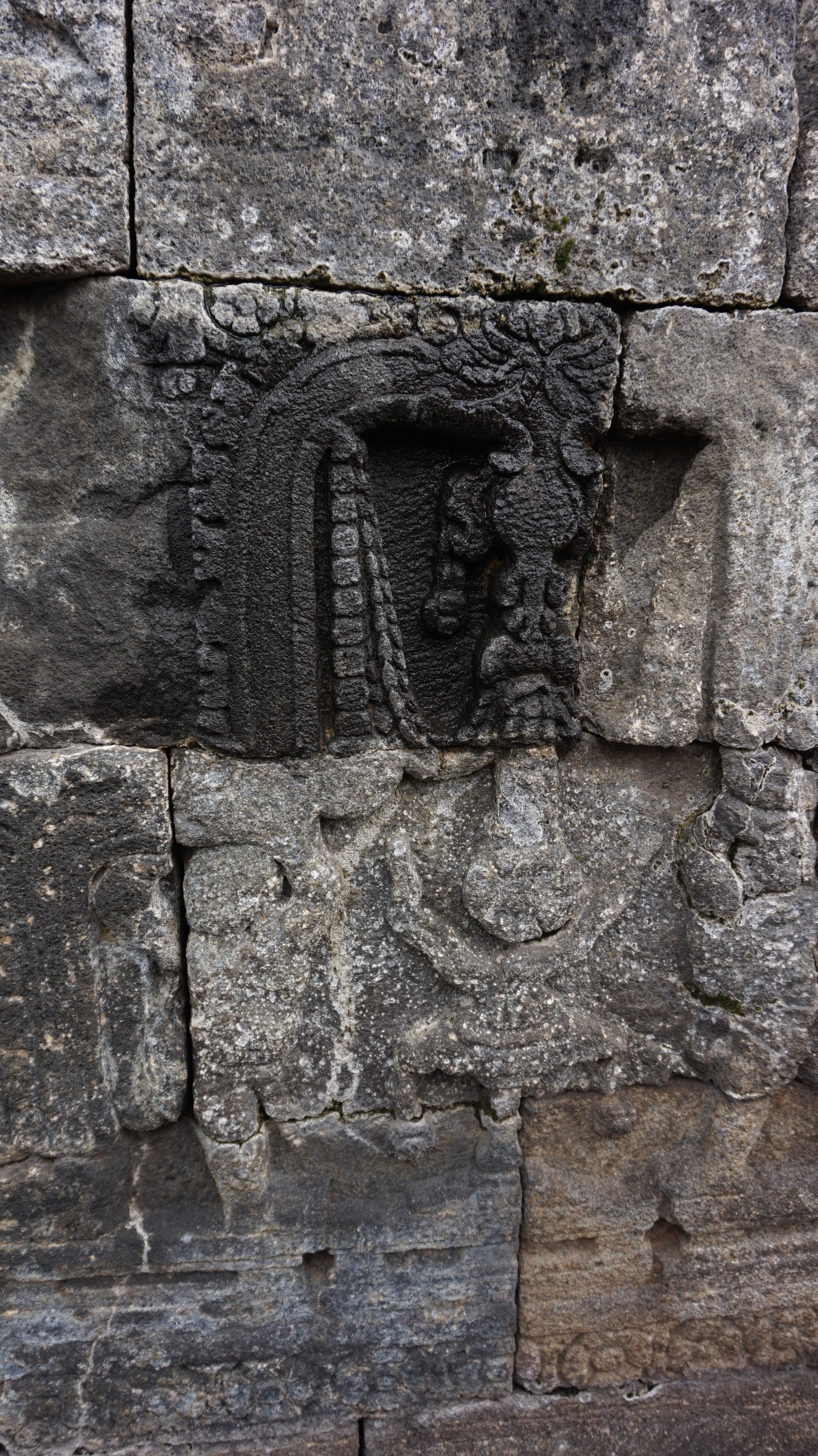
Penjor carving on Borobudur’s temple walls. The motif suggests that penjor-like decorative traditions existed in the archipelago before the construction of Borobudur.

In 2016, a Penjor Festival was held at the Borobudur Temple complex in Magelang, Central Java. The event featured participants from twenty villages and sought to revive declining skills in janur artistry. It included workshops, competitions, and creative showcases, while also supporting tourism development around Borobudur.

== Penjor festivals in Bali ==
=== GWK Cultural Park (Badung) ===
Garuda Wisnu Kencana (GWK) Cultural Park has organized one of the most visible Penjor Festivals in Bali. Coverage of the 2025 festival (31 October–1 November) notes barong competitions, mekendang tunggal (traditional single drummer in Bali), balaganjur parades, ogoh-ogoh mini exhibitions, and collaborative performances by local art communities.

Festival organizers emphasize traditional symbolism while presenting Balinese culture to national and international audiences.

=== Serangan Penjor Festival ===
In Serangan, Denpasar, the Penjor Festival is held near Pura Sakenan during Galungan and Kuningan and involves all local youth organizations (STT). The event is organized in collaboration with Desa Adat Serangan and Kura-Kura Bali (BTID). Activities highlight traditional materials, local symbolism, and cultural education for younger generations.

=== Kerobokan Festival ===
The Kerobokan Festival in Desa Adat Kerobokan is one of Bali’s largest penjor competitions, involving 52 banjar. Reports highlight monumental penjor—often around 13 metres tall—lining Jalan Raya Kerobokan.

The festival emphasizes the regeneration of undagi penjor (penjor artisans), creativity using local materials, and strengthening Kerobokan’s cultural identity.

== Symbolism and cultural significance ==
Penjor are central to Balinese Hindu ritual practice. The bamboo pole and its curve symbolize Mount Agung and the mythical Naga Basuki, while ornaments such as rice, coconut, fruits, and textiles represent fertility, prosperity, and divine blessings.

Festival programs often include educational components teaching philosophical concepts such as Tri Hita Karana and traditional techniques of penjor construction.

== Impact ==
Penjor Festivals receive broad regional and national coverage and contribute to cultural preservation, youth engagement, and local tourism. They attract both local visitors and international tourists and are viewed as reinforcing community cohesion and promoting Balinese cultural identity.

== See also ==
- Penjor
- Galungan
- Kuningan (Bali)
- Balinese Hinduism
- Culture of Bali
