= Lamak =

Ritual object in Balinese Hinduism

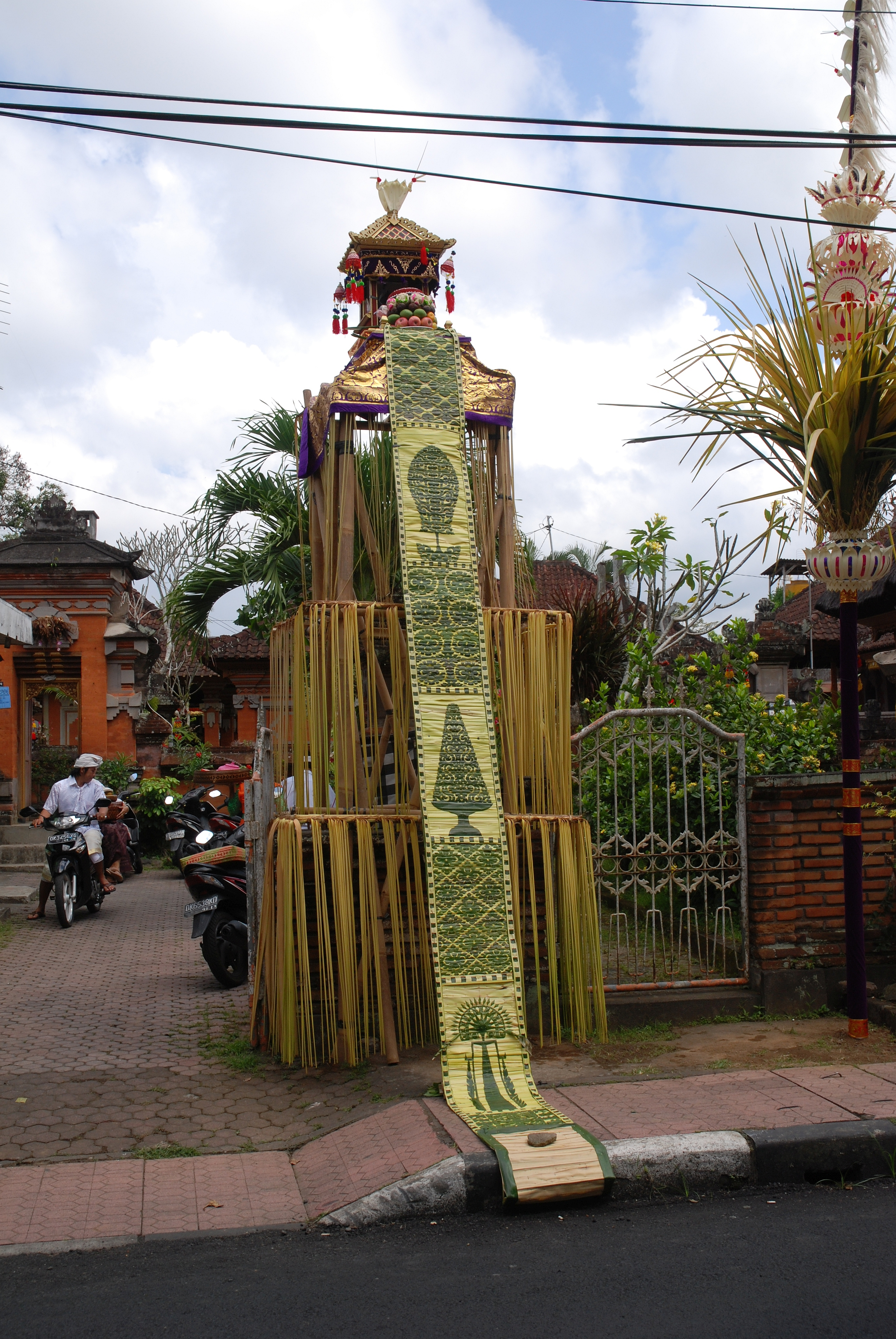
Lamak nganten at Galungan in Ubud

A lamak is a ritual object in Balinese Hinduism. It is a rectangular mat woven from palm leaves, serving as a decoration for altars and shrines.

== Description ==
Lamaks are narrow, elongated mats woven from the leaves of the coconut palm (Cocos nucifera), sugar palm (Arenga pinnata), or palmyra palm (Borassus flabellifer). The techniques and motifs used are highly diverse and depend on the intended use. Often, yellow leaves of the coconut or sugar palm are combined with light, older leaves of the palmyra palm to enhance the contrast of the motifs.

== Use ==
A Lamak is particularly used during the Galungan festival. Before the entrance of each house, a Penjor is erected, a decorated bamboo pole with a small shrine attached. A lamak is hung on this shrine. For the temple festival Odalan, all shrines in the temple are adorned with a lamak. A special case is the elaborately decorated Lamak nganten. This sometimes meter-long "wedding" Lamak is set up in front of houses during the Galungan festival where a wedding took place in the previous year.
