= Dodol =

Southeast Asian sweet toffee

Dodol/Kalamae/Mont kalar mei
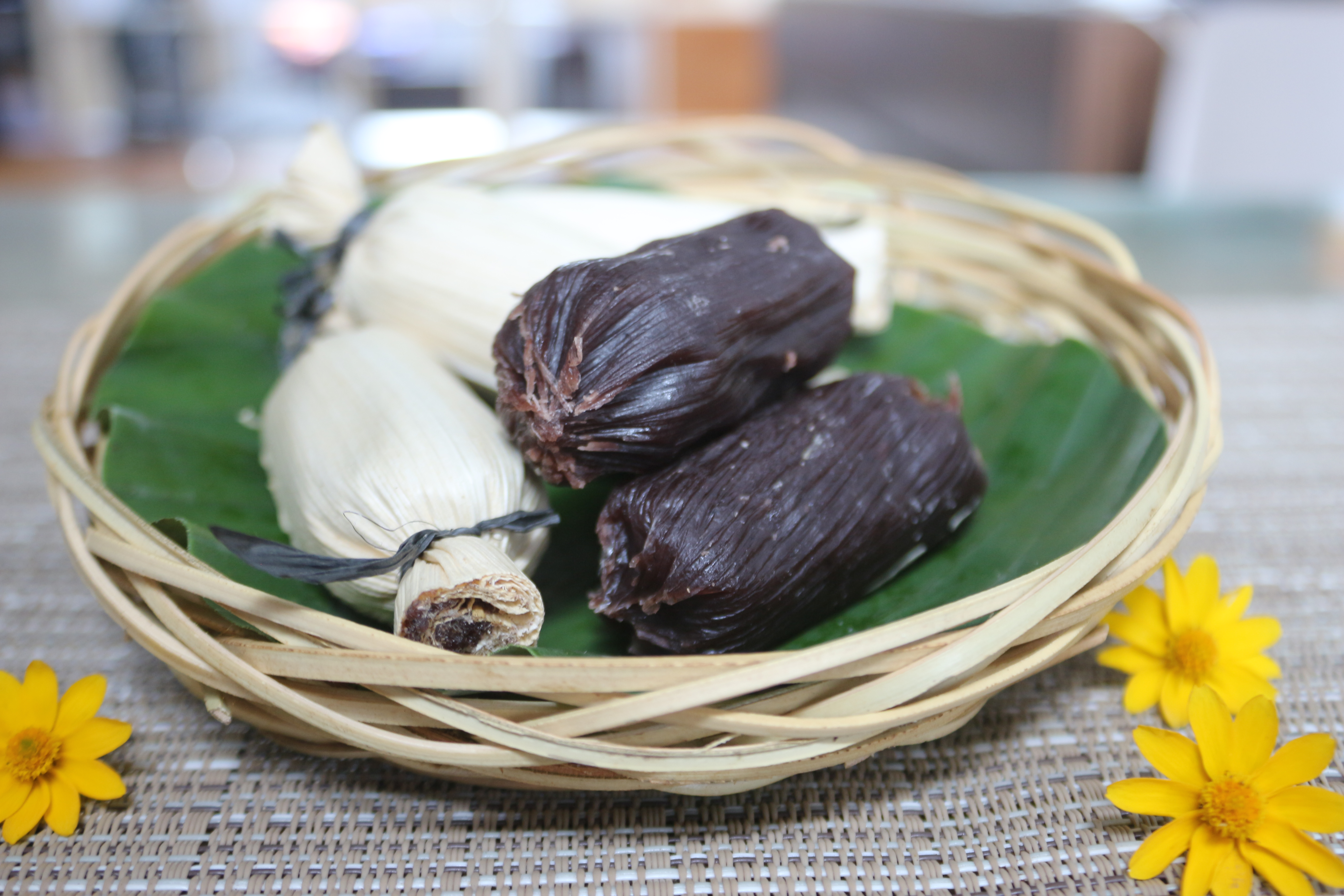
- Balinese dodol
- Type: Confectionery
- Region or state: Southeast Asia and Indian subcontinent
- Associated cuisine: Indonesia, Malaysia, Thailand, Myanmar, Brunei, the Philippines, Singapore, Sri Lanka and India
- Main ingredients: Coconut milk, jaggery, rice flour
- Variations: wajik, kalamay, clorot, lempuk

Dodol, also known as kalamae (Thai: กะละแม), or mont kalar mei (Burmese: မုန့်ကုလားမဲ), is a traditional sweet confection of Southeast Asia, particularly associated with Indonesia, Malaysia, Brunei, Singapore, Thailand and Myanmar. It is made by slowly simmering coconut milk and palm sugar with rice flour or glutinous rice until it thickens into a sticky, chewy consistency.

The confection later spread to South Asia, where it developed into kalu dodol in Sri Lanka and into regional variants in India, including goan dodol in Goa and thothal halwa in Tamil Nadu. In the Philippines, a closely related variant called kalamay is prepared with sugarcane sugar instead of palm sugar. These sweets are commonly featured in festivals, communal gatherings and other significant occasions, reflecting their cultural importance across Southeast Asia and parts of the Indian subcontinent.

== History ==
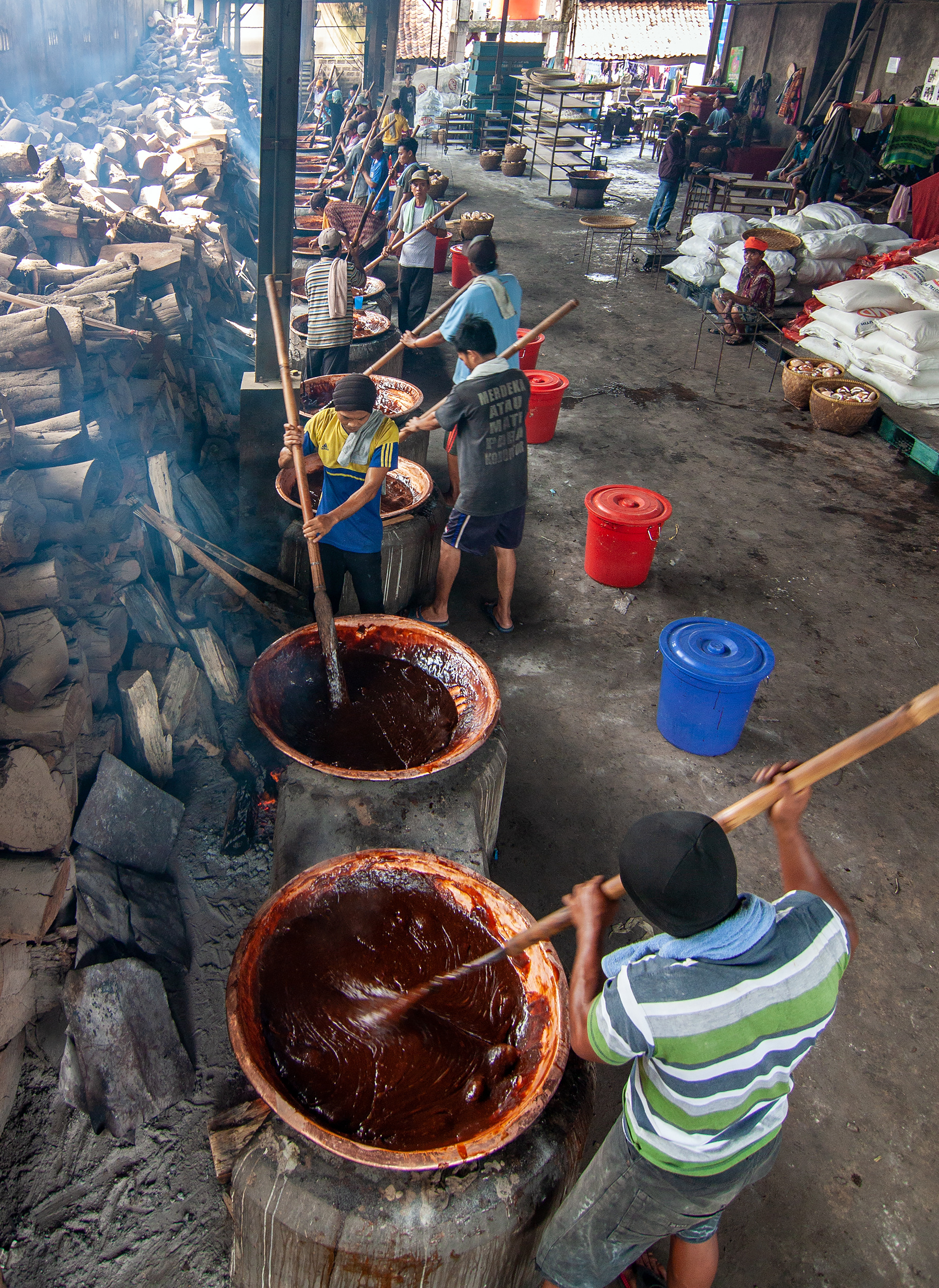
Traditional preparation of Betawi dodol in Tangerang, near Jakarta

=== Origins and regional presence ===
The exact origin of dodol, kalamea or mont kalar mei is not clearly documented, and there is no definitive evidence identifying where or when the confection was first developed. Since coconut, palm sugar, and rice were long-standing dietary staples across Southeast Asia, similar sweets may have arisen independently in different regions rather than from a single point of origin.

These confections are known by various names across Southeast Asia, including dodol in maritime regions, calamay or dudol in the Philippines, dudoi, kalamea or kalamay in Thailand, mont kalar mei in Myanmar, galamai or gelamai in parts of Sumatra and jenang in Java. Despite differences in terminology, they share broadly similar methods of preparation, reflecting a common culinary tradition in the region.

In the Philippines, for example, kalamay has a long history in the Visayas and Mindanao, with origins traced to pre-colonial methods of cooking and preserving glutinous rice with coconut milk and sugarcane juice. These techniques allowed rice harvests to be stored over longer periods while also serving ritual and communal purposes. Beyond the Visayas, related sweets such as dudol and dodol are also found in other regions. In northern Luzon, a version appears in Ilocano culinary tradition and is believed to have been introduced by Malay and Indian settlers before Spanish colonization. In parts of Mindanao and the Sulu Archipelago, dodol is widely prepared by the Maranao, Maguindanaon and Tausug, typically wrapped in mamaan leaves or colourful cellophane, and sometimes moulded into cylinders and sliced into discs, closely resembling forms seen in Indonesia and Malaysia.

In Thailand, kalamae is traditionally associated with southern regions, including in Phatthalung Province, where it is regarded as a longstanding local specialty. Some historical accounts suggest that the confection developed from ya khanom ('medicine sweet'), an older southern Thai preparation. Another perspective links its origins to the Mon and Burmese languages, in which a similar sweet is known as kwayn kalamae (kwayn meaning “confection”). Over time, the preparation evolved into its present form, in which palm sugar syrup and coconut milk are simmered before the gradual addition of rice flour, producing a sticky confection that can be stored for extended periods. In Krabi Province, the dessert is also called yanom, a local name used by southern Thais, which literally means “lord of sweets” (phaya khanom) due to its reputation for exceptional taste. Among the Thai-Malay community, the sweet is known as dodoi, where it continues to be prepared as part of local heritage and communal tradition.

One of the early written references to dodol appears in Javanese sources, where the term is derived from the Old Javanese word dodol or dwadwal, meaning 'a snack made from sticky rice flour and sugar.' m Early forms were prepared with palm sugar, rice flour and flavourings such as durian. The confection is also listed in the Gemekan inscription from 852 Saka (930 CE) and was served in royal banquets of the Mataram Kingdom (8th–11th centuries), highlighting its role in courtly as well as everyday food culture.

This broader diffusion is also evident in Sumatra, the Malay Peninsula, Borneo and Sulawesi, all historically important centres of trade and cultural exchange in the region. The widespread availability of coconut, palm sugar and rice in these areas supported the development of similar confections, which became embedded in local culinary traditions, particularly in association with communal and festive occasions.

=== Introduction to South Asia ===
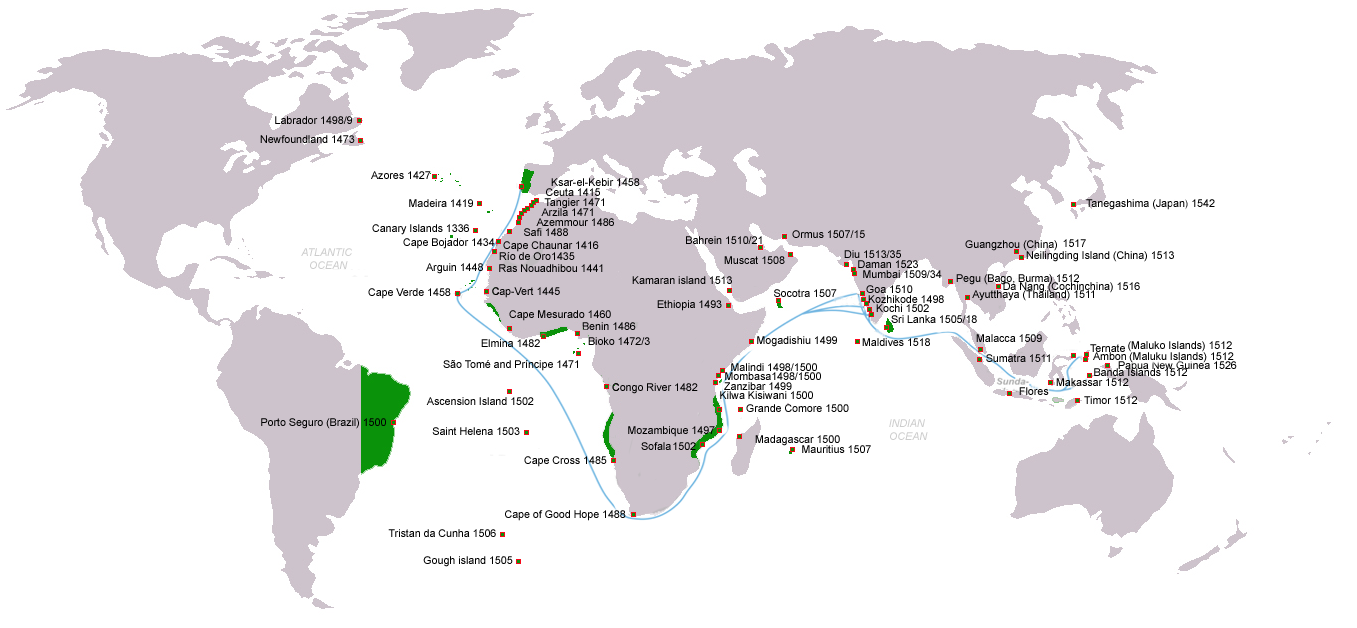
16th–17th century Portuguese trade routes, showing possible paths for the introduction of dodol to Goa, India and Sri Lanka. An alternative perspective attributes its presence in Sri Lanka to the culinary traditions of Sri Lankan Malays during the periods of Dutch and British Ceylon.

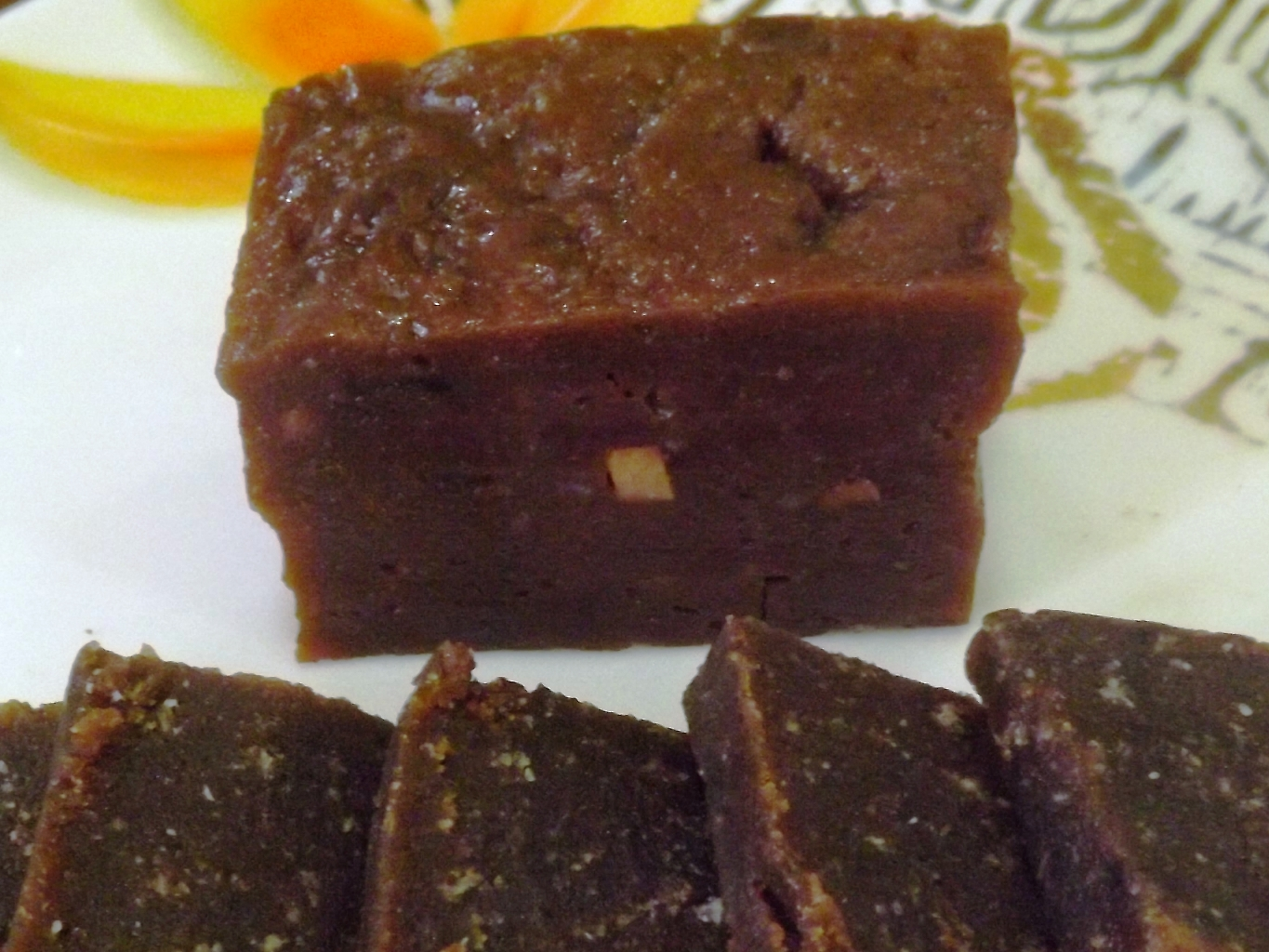
Kalu dodol, a Sri Lankan variety of dodol

Beyond Southeast Asia, a parallel development occurred in Sri Lanka, where kalu dodol, a glutinous sweet strongly linked to the Sri Lankan Malay community, became established during the colonial period. The confection was introduced by migrants from the Malay Archipelago during the colonial period and subsequently became part of the island's wider culinary culture. It is now prepared by Sinhalese, Moor and Malay communities, with the southern town of Hambantota recognised as a centre of production. Other sources suggest that Portuguese influence may have played an earlier role in the introduction or adaptation of kalu dodol, indicating historical culinary connections between Sri Lanka and Southeast Asia.

Portuguese influence also contributed to the introduction of dodol in Goa, India during the 16th century, where it became a staple of festival cuisine. In the region, the sweet is traditionally prepared for religious and cultural celebrations and is often flavoured with cardamom and garnished with cashews.

A related variant, thothal halwa (locally known as lothal or nudhal), developed in Tamil Nadu, particularly in towns such as Kilakarai and Ramanathapuram. It was likely introduced via Sri Lanka and has since become an established part of the region's culinary heritage.

== Cultural significance ==
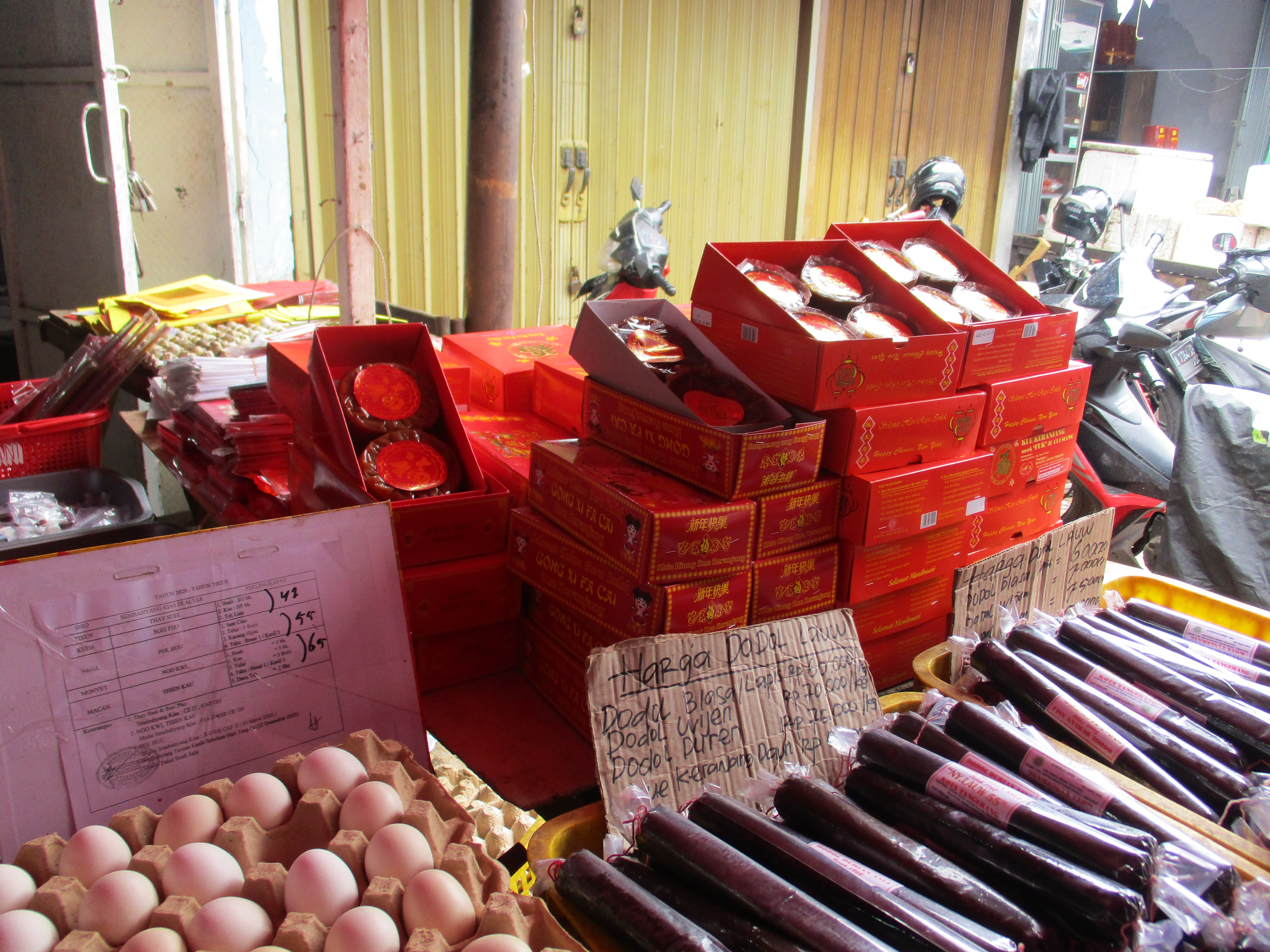
Chinese pastries at Pasar Lama market in Tangerang, including dodol among other traditional sweets

Dodol or kalamea is closely associated with festivals, religious observances and communal celebrations across Southeast Asia. In Muslim-majority countries such as Indonesia, Malaysia, Brunei and in regions with significant Muslim populations including Singapore, southern Thailand, southern Philippines and Sri Lanka, it is commonly prepared for Eid al-Fitr and Eid al-Adha, and is often served at other important occasions such as weddings, religious gatherings and family celebrations. The sweet is widely regarded as a symbol of hospitality, steadfastness and the strength of communal bonds.

Beyond its role in Muslim traditions, dodol features in diverse religious and cultural contexts. Among the Ilocano people of northern Philippines, known locally as dudol, it is considered part of local food heritage, its thickness and stickiness symbolising family solidarity and unity. Traditionally made from ground glutinous rice (diket), coconut milk (gettá) and sugarcane juice (benńal), it is prepared during Holy Week, for atáng offerings to the dead on All Saints’ Day (Undas) and at the Guling-Guling Festival in Paoay, Ilocos Norte, a pre-Lenten celebration of Spanish colonial origin.

In Bali, dodol is offered during the Hindu festival of Galungan to symbolise the destruction of falsehood and the cultivation of spiritual clarity, while among Chinese Indonesians it is prepared as nian gao for Imlek (Chinese New Year). Across these varied settings, dodol and its regional variants serve as symbolic foods that reinforce social bonds and mark occasions of spiritual and communal significance.

In Thailand, kalamare (or kalamae) holds deep cultural significance and is closely tied to major social and religious occasions. Often served at weddings, its sticky texture is interpreted as a metaphor for fidelity and lasting bonds between couples, while its sweetness symbolises wishes for happiness and harmony in family life. Because its preparation requires patience and long, careful stirring, it further embodies the perseverance and cooperation expected in marriage. Beyond weddings, kalamae is one of the three sweets traditionally prepared for the Thai New Year (Songkran Festival), as well as for ordination rites and communal ceremonies. A few days before such events, hosts typically invite neighbours to help stir the sweet, reinforcing ideals of generosity and social solidarity. It is also offered in wedding processions (khan maak) and ancestor rites, served to monks and shared with guests, making it both a symbol of togetherness and a gift of goodwill.

Through colonial and cultural exchange, dodol and related sweets spread beyond Southeast Asia. In Sri Lanka, kalu dodol is a popular festive sweet, traditionally prepared for occasions such as Eid and the Sinhala New Year. In Goa, India, dodol is traditionally served at weddings and during Christmas. Across these regions, dodol and its variants have been adapted to local tastes and integrated into communal traditions.

== Culinary profile ==
=== Preparation ===
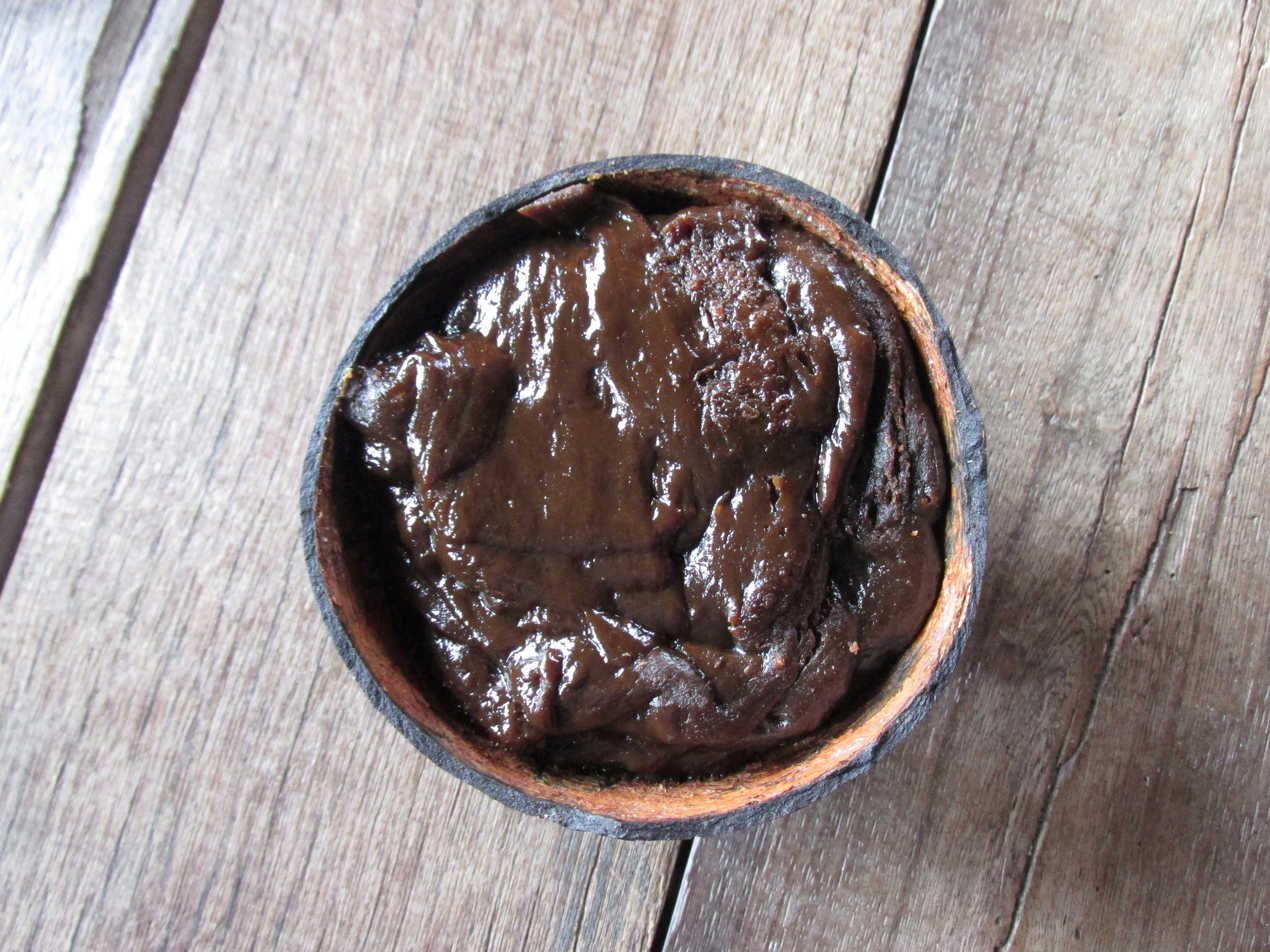
Galamai, a Minangkabau version of dodol from West Sumatra, Indonesia

Dodol is made from coconut milk, jaggery, and rice flour, and is sticky, thick and sweet. The cooking process would reduce the contents by up to half as the liquid evaporates. It normally takes 2 to 9 hours to cook, depending on the technique and tools used. During the entire cooking process, the dodol must be constantly stirred in a big wok. Pausing in between would cause it to burn, spoiling the taste and aroma. The dodol is completely cooked when it is firm and does not stick to one's fingers when touching it.

=== Variations ===
==== Indonesia ====
Across Indonesia, dodol has developed into numerous regional varieties that reflect local ingredients, traditions and cultural contexts. In West Java, dodol Garut is considered an iconic variant, produced in different flavours such as durian, chocolate and soursop, while Central Java is known for jenang Kudus, which has a softer texture and lighter colour. In Sumatra and Kalimantan, lempok durian is prepared from pure durian flesh without glutinous rice flour and in West Sumatra, galamai incorporates roasted peanuts, giving it a distinctive nutty flavour.

Other notable types include wajit Cililin from West Java, wrapped in corn husks, dodol Betawi from Jakarta, traditionally prepared for Lebaran and madumongso from East Java, made from fermented black glutinous rice. Regional specialities also include meuseukat in Aceh, which uses pineapple and spices, asidah in Maluku with strong Middle Eastern influences and alame in Mandailing, North Sumatra, prepared communally before Eid. These regional forms illustrate how dodol has been adapted to local tastes and continues to play an important role in ritual, festive and everyday culinary traditions throughout the archipelago.

==== Malaysia ====
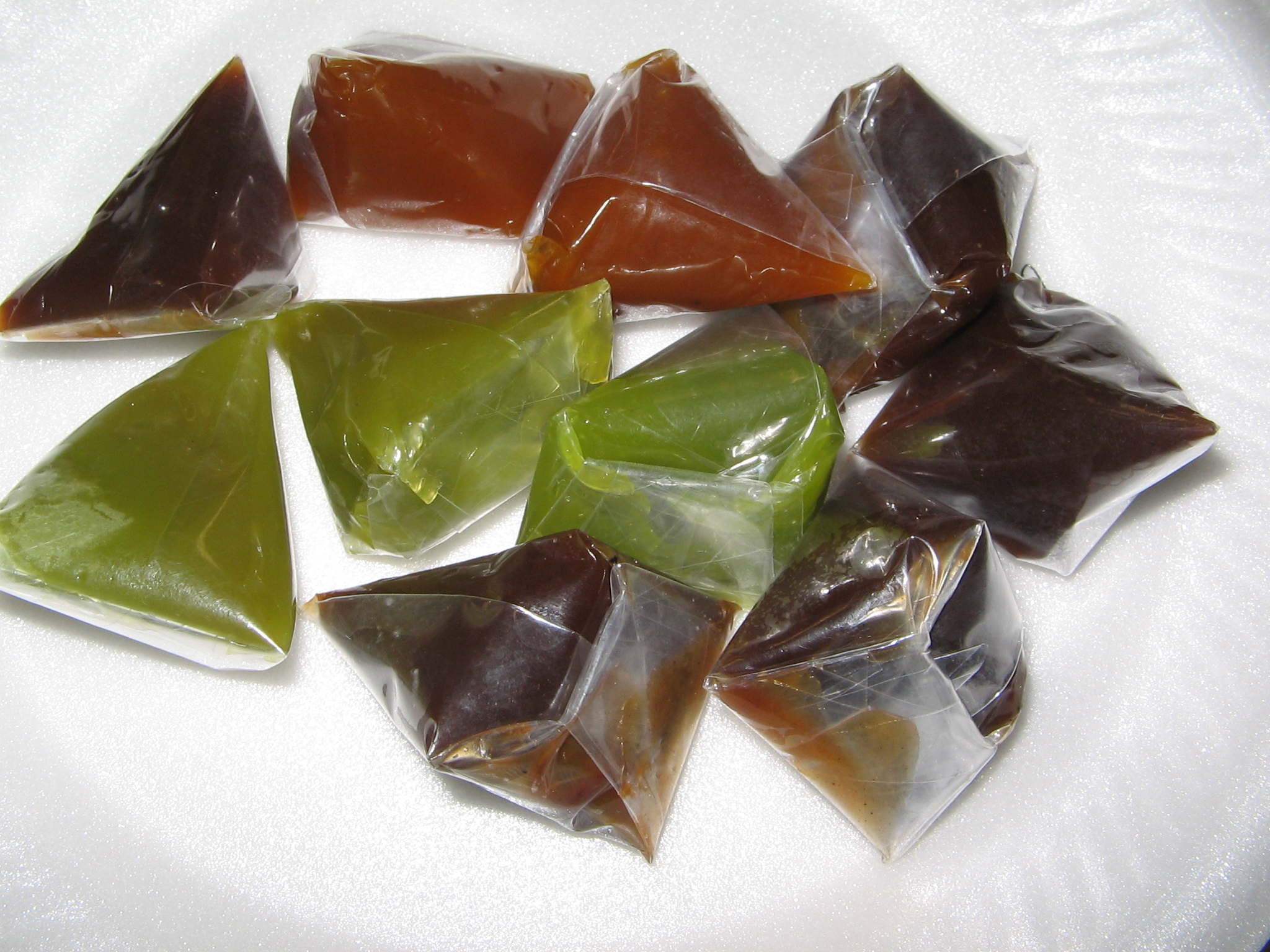
Malaysian dodol wrapped in triangular packets, shown in various colours

In Malaysia, dodol is produced in a variety of flavours that reflect local preferences for fruit and nut ingredients. Dodol durian is particularly popular, made by incorporating durian flesh into the mixture to create a strong aroma and lasting flavour. Other common types include dodol kacang, which blends in ground peanuts or mung beans for additional texture and dodol nanas, where fresh pineapple is added to balance the confection's sweetness with a slightly tangy taste. Modern variations have also emerged, featuring flavours such as strawberry, chocolate and banana, while rare or speciality types, including aloe vera and seaweed, can occasionally be found in local markets.

==== The Philippines ====
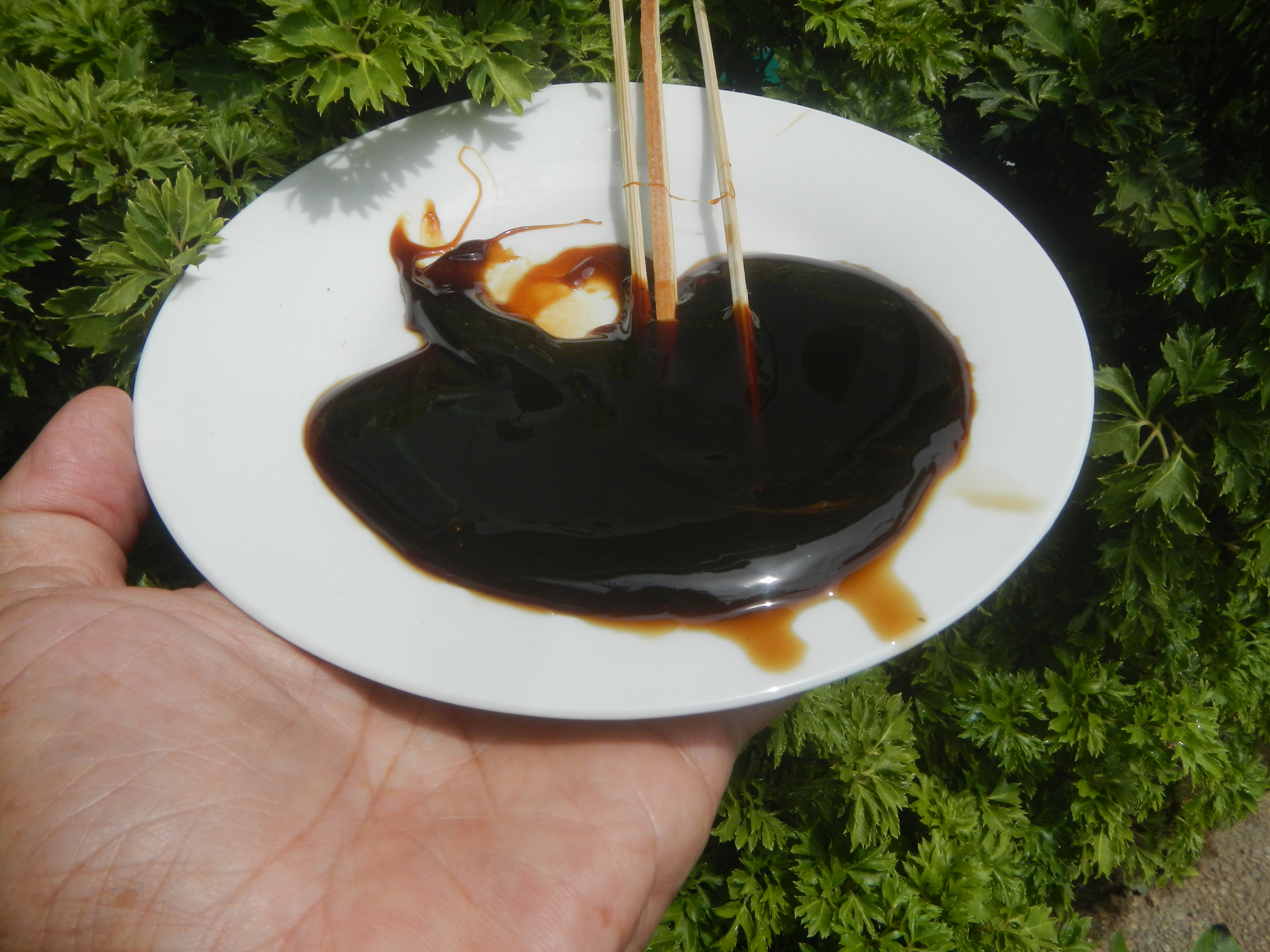
Baguio kalamay, locally known as sundot kulangot (literally 'picked booger').

In the Philippines, kalamay is prepared in numerous regional forms, often distinguished by their ingredients and packaging. In Bohol, the traditional kalamay hati is dark brown in colour and typically sold in coconut shell halves sealed with red paper strips, sometimes topped with latik or sesame seeds. Other popular versions include kalamay ube, which uses purple yam to create a distinct colour and flavour and kalamay buna, which incorporates whole peanuts for added texture and nuttiness.

Presentation also varies across regions. Kalamay sa bao is served in young coconut shells with some of the meat still attached, while kalamay lansong is packaged in bamboo tubes, a style common in areas outside Bohol. These variations highlight the adaptability of kalamay to local tastes and resources while preserving its identity as a sticky rice-based confection.

Another sticky rice-based sweet in the southern Philippines is Maranao dodol. Like kalamay, it is prepared as a sticky, chewy confection and wrapped in corn husks or dried leaves of banana or abaca. Dodol is sold widely in Marawi City and nearby towns in Lanao del Sur, particularly in Ganassi and is available in small, medium and large sizes along roadside stalls and markets, often visited by travellers between Cotabato City and Marawi.

==== Thailand ====
In Thailand, there are two main types of kalamae distinguished by their primary ingredient. Kalamae met (“grain kalamae”) is considered the original form, prepared with whole glutinous rice grains simmered with coconut milk and sugar until they form a sticky mass, with some rice kernels remaining partly intact. The second type, kalamae paeng (“flour kalamae”), is made using glutinous rice flour instead of whole grains, producing a smoother texture. Most kalamae available today are of the flour variety, as it is easier to prepare and allows for adaptation with added colours, flavours and scents such as red colouring, chocolate or pandan.

==== Sri Lanka ====
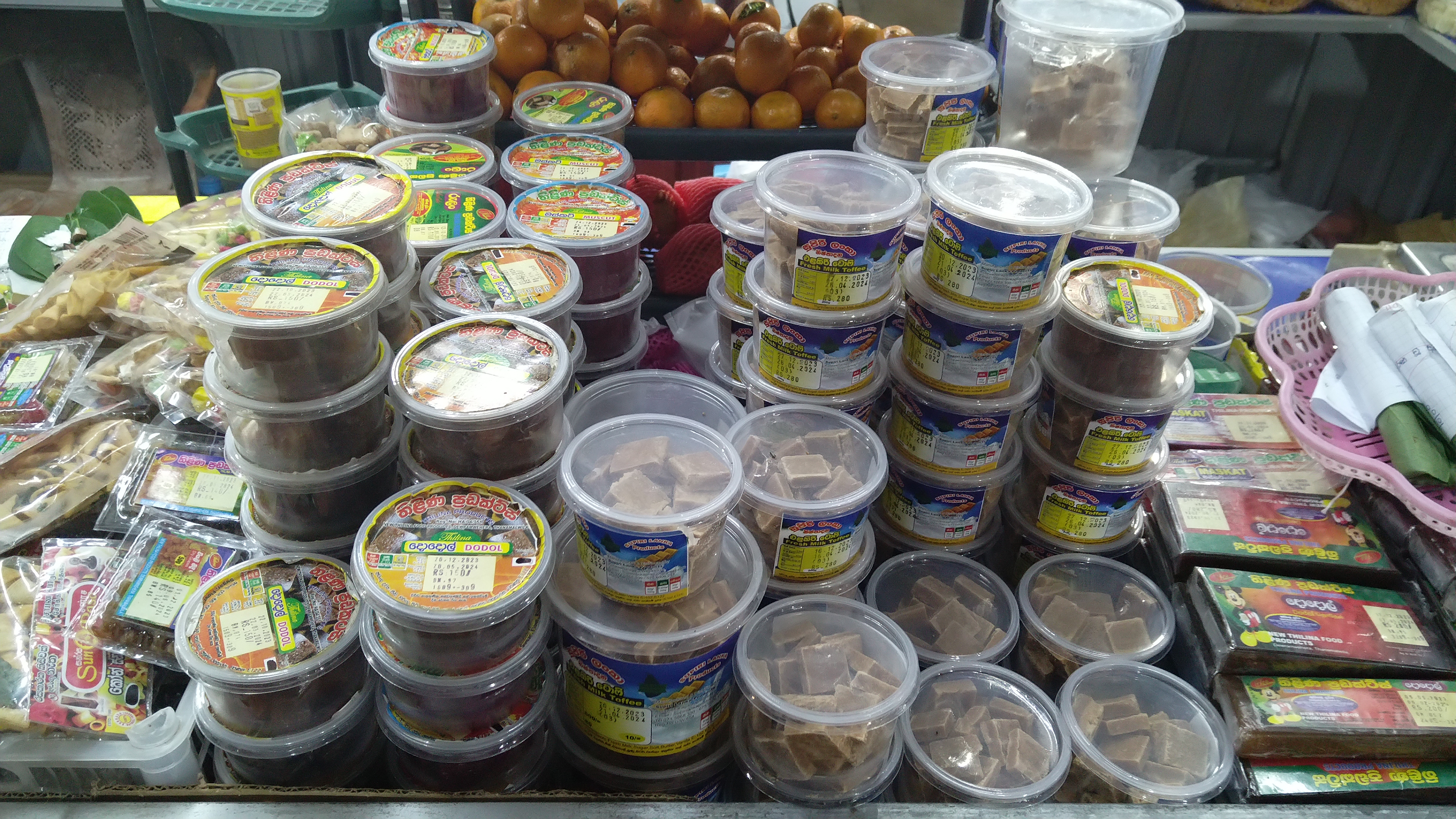
Dodol sold at a market in Sri Lanka

In Sri Lanka, dodol is known as kalu dodol. It is traditionally prepared using rice flour, coconut milk and palm sugar or jaggery. Unlike other regional varieties that commonly use glutinous rice flour, Sri Lankan recipes typically use flour from local rice varieties with lower gluten content. The dish is often sweetened with jaggery derived from the foxtail palm (kithul), which imparts a darker colour and a characteristic smoky flavour.

==== India ====
In Goa, dodol is made using rice flour, coconut milk and jaggery or palm sugar, with ghee added for richness. The sweet is often flavoured with cardamom and garnished with cashews. This preparation produces a sticky, chewy confection similar in texture to other Southeast Asian and South Asian varieties of dodol, while reflecting local Goan ingredients and culinary preferences.

== In culture ==
In colloquial Indonesian, dodol can also be used as a slang term for the word 'bodoh' to refer to a person as being 'stupid' or 'illogical'. It is impolite to refer a person as dodol.

== See also ==
- Butterscotch
- Caramel candy
- Kalamay
- Kulolo
- Nian gao
- Nougat
