= Kuningan (Bali) =

Hindu religious festival celebrated primarily in Bali, Indonesia

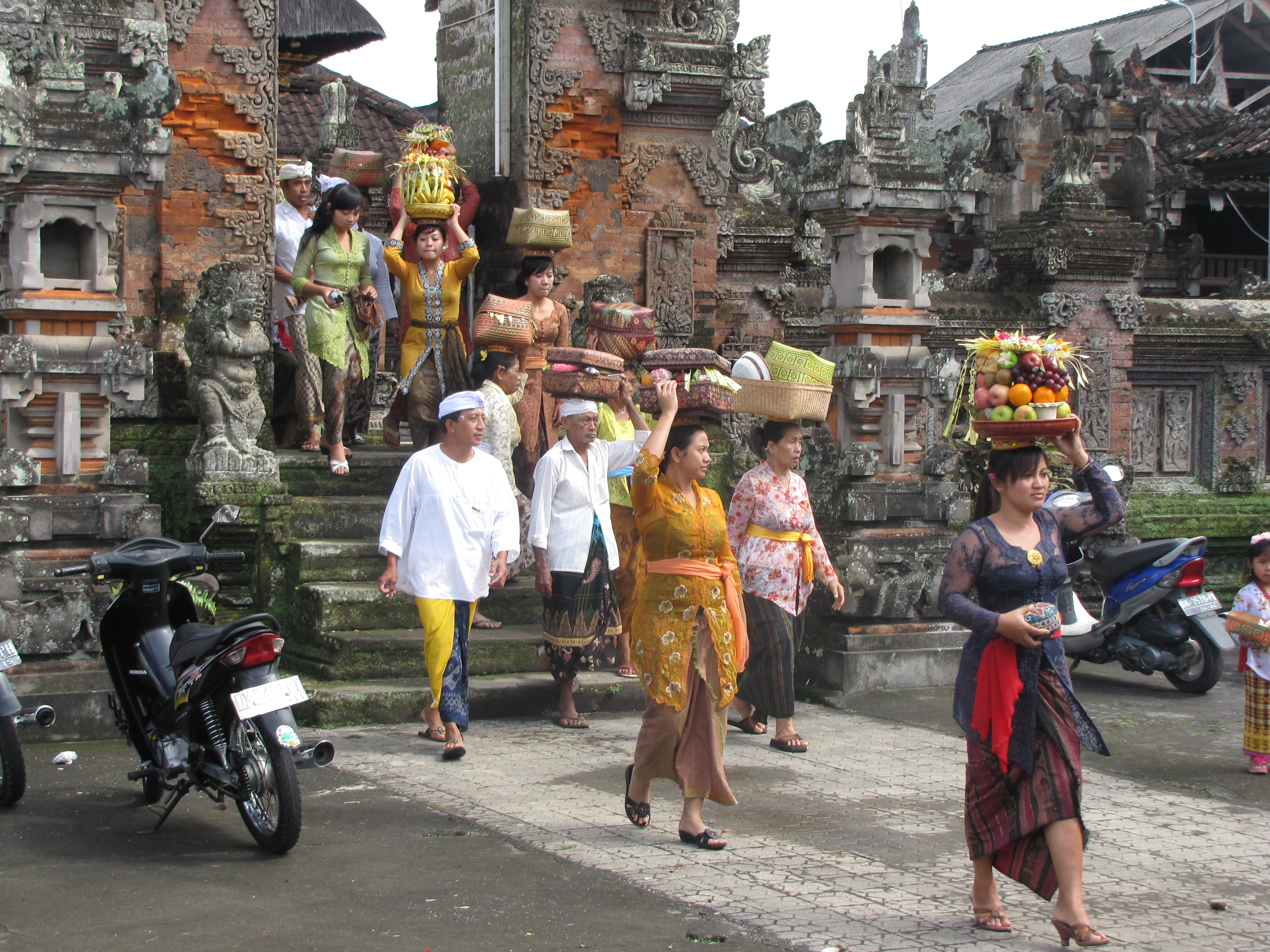
- Balinese Hindus leaving a temple during Kuningan, the closing day of the Galungan festival.
- Observed by: Balinese Hindus
- Type: Hindu
- Date: 10 days after Galungan
- Frequency: semiannual
- Related to: Galungan, Nyepi

Kuningan is a Hindu religious festival celebrated primarily in Bali, Indonesia. It marks the final day of the eleven-day Galungan period and falls on Saniscara Kliwon Wuku Kuningan in the 210-day Pawukon calendar. Kuningan is understood as the moment when ancestral spirits, who descended to the household shrines during Galungan, return to the divine realm.

== Meaning and significance ==
The term Kuningan is traditionally associated with kauningan, meaning “to receive enlightenment or awareness.” In Balinese Hindu belief, the festival is a closing rite in which devotees express gratitude for blessings received during Galungan and reaffirm commitment to dharma (righteousness) over adharma (chaos or negativity).

Kuningan is also interpreted as a moment of “notification” or “affirmation” (nguningang), when individuals remind themselves of their spiritual duties and of maintaining inner balance.

Rituals must be completed before midday, as Balinese tradition teaches that divine blessings are present only until the sun reaches its zenith.

== Rituals and offerings ==
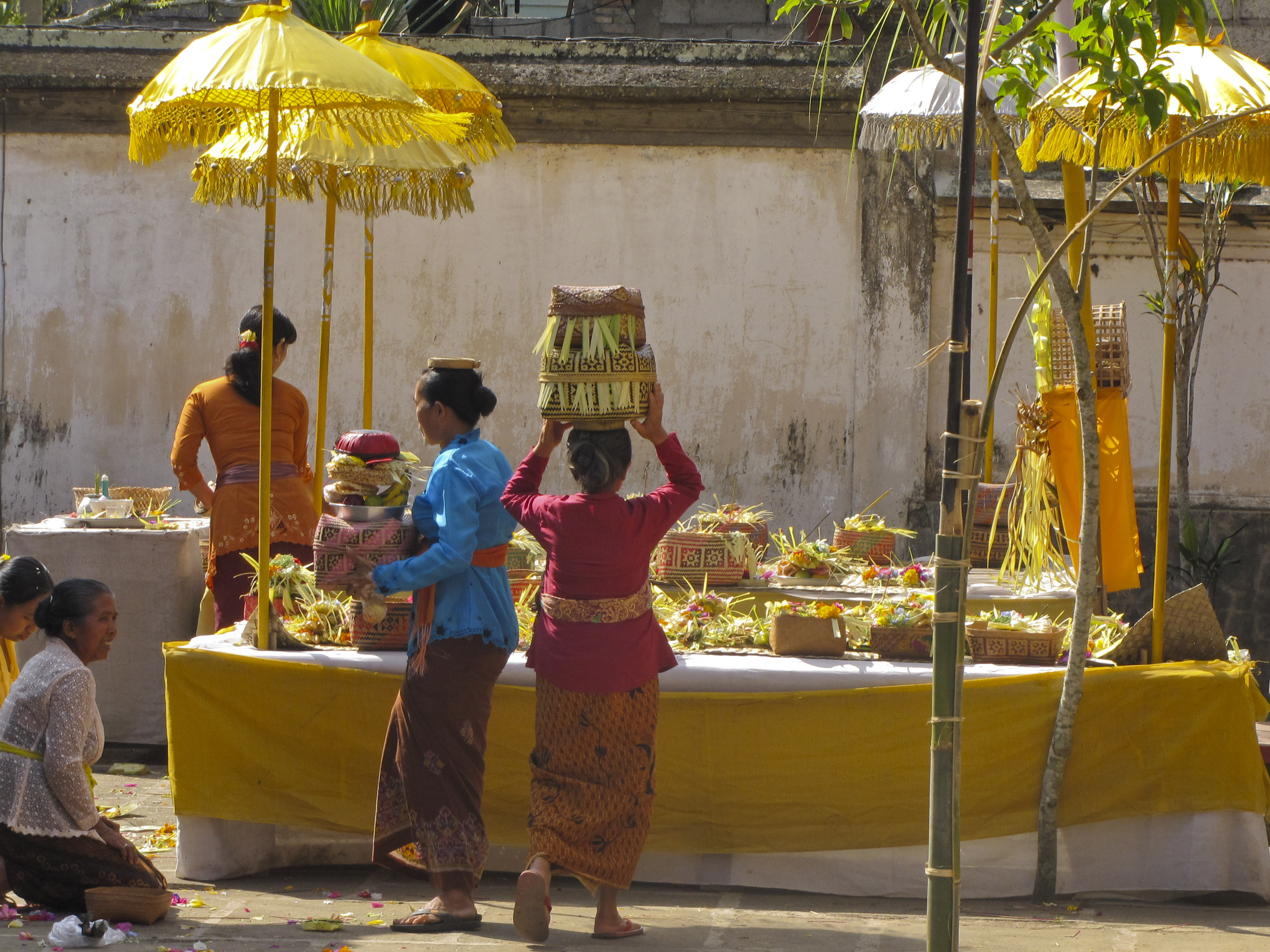
Offerings and ritual decorations during Kuningan in Bali.

Typical observances include preparing nasi kuning (yellow rice) as a symbol of prosperity, and decorating household and temple shrines with:

- Tamiang, round ornaments symbolizing protection and the cosmic cycle
- Kolem, representing resilience and spiritual defense
- Endongan, symbolizing provisions for the ancestral journey

In addition to symbolic decorations, Balinese Hindus prepare banten (ritual offerings) consisting of arranged foods, fruits, flowers, and ceremonial items.

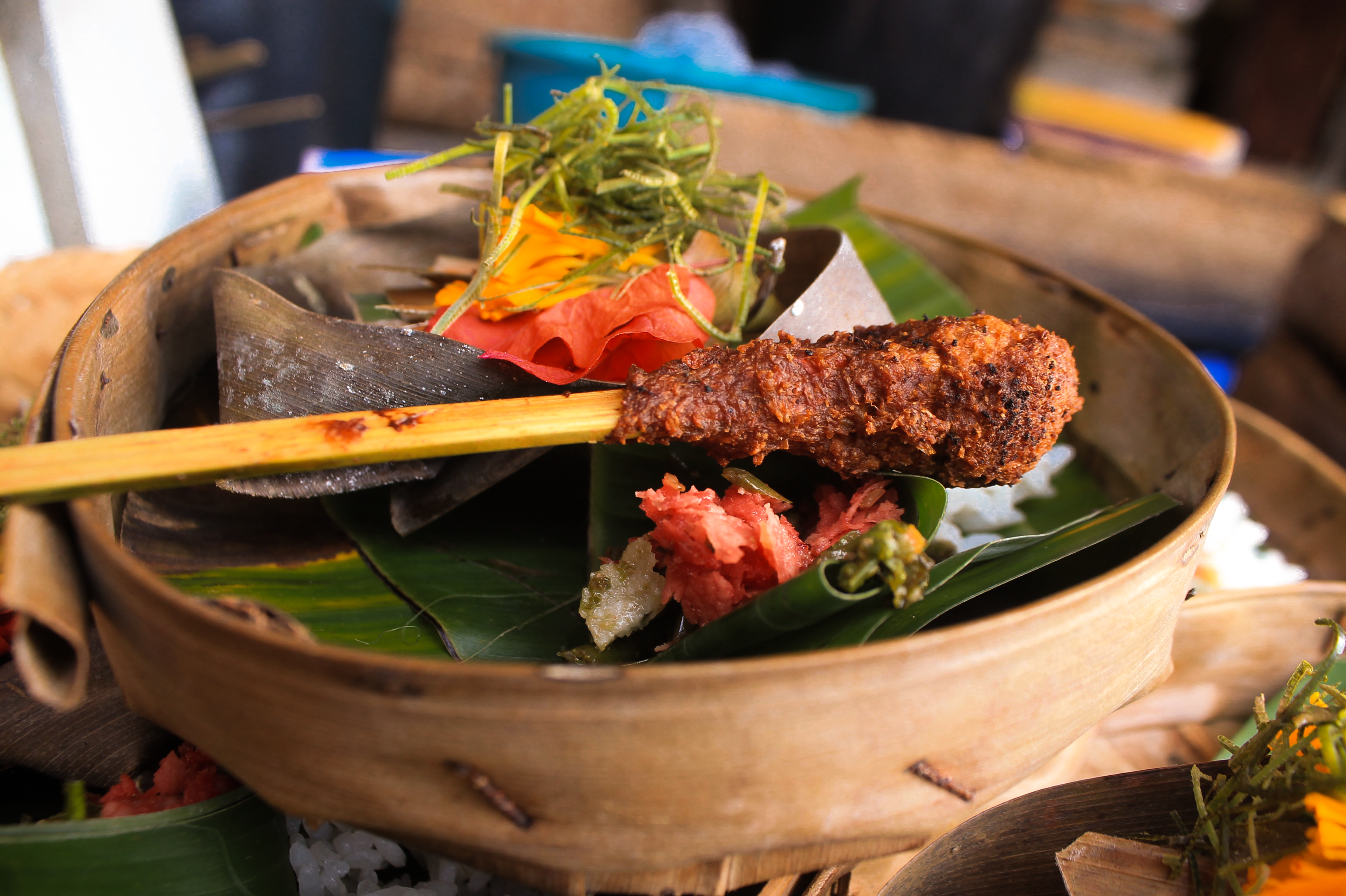
Traditional offerings (banten) prepared for Galungan and Kuningan celebrations in Bali.

These ritual objects express gratitude for sustenance and remind devotees to maintain harmony between humans, nature, and the divine.

== Cultural traditions ==
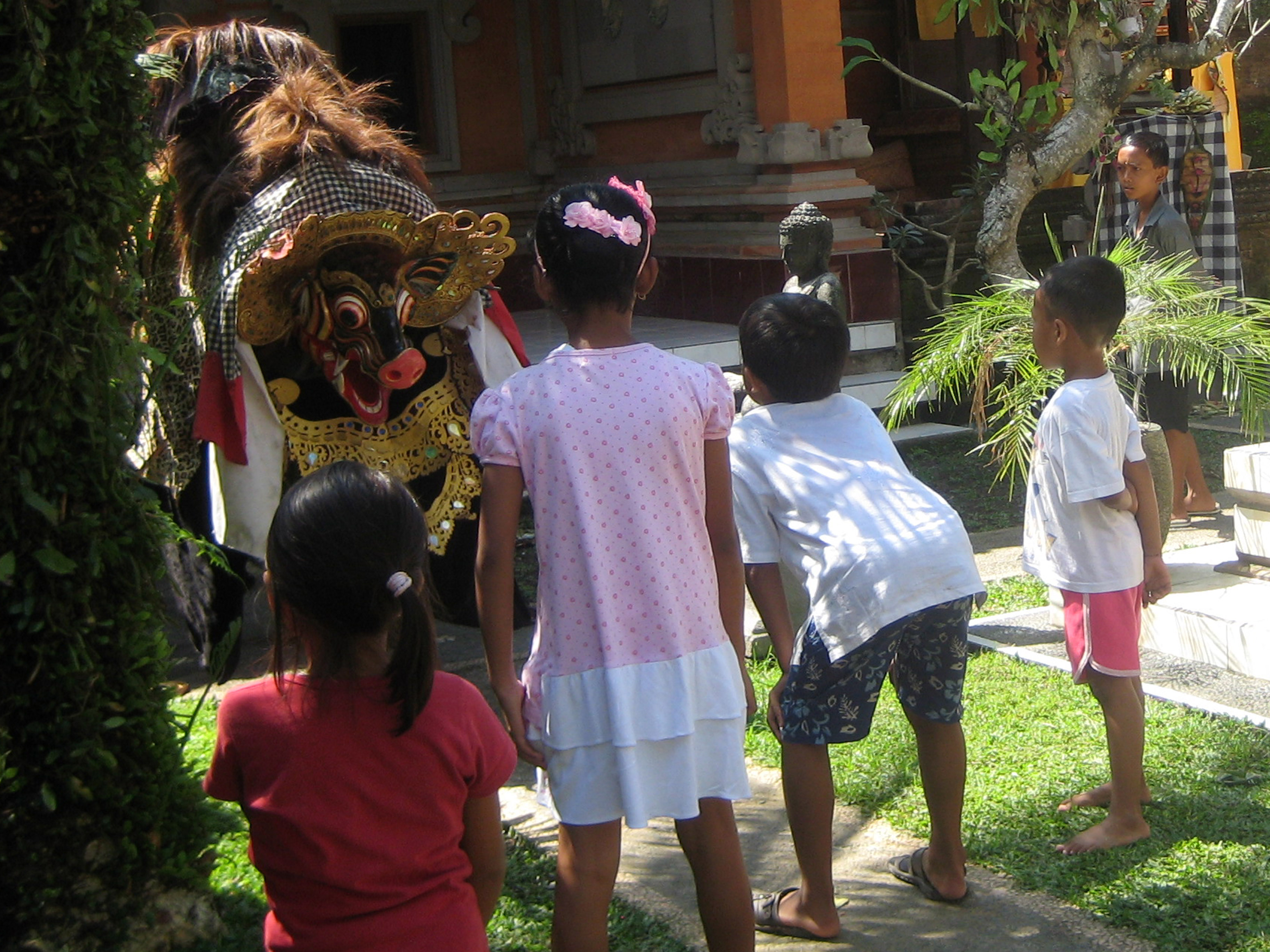
Children enjoying a lion dance performance during Kuningan in Bali.

While Kuningan is celebrated across Bali, some regions maintain distinctive customs. In Tabanan, the community performs the tradition of Mesuryak, in which families symbolically “send off” the ancestors by scattering money that is collected by local residents. The practice is believed to bring joy to both ancestors and the living, and to encourage generosity.

== Relationship to Galungan ==
Kuningan occurs ten days after Galungan, completing the cycle of ancestral visitation. After Kuningan, the Galungan decorations—including penjor—are traditionally removed on Pegat Wakan, the concluding day of the broader ritual period.

== See also ==
- Galungan
- Nyepi
- Hinduism in Indonesia
- Balinese culture
- Penjor Festival
