= Gavin Kwan Adsit =

Indonesian footballer

Gavin Kwan
Personal information
- Full name: Gavin Kwan Adsit
- Date of birth: 5 April 1996 (age 30)
- Place of birth: Kerobokan, Indonesia
- Height: 1.80 m (5 ft 11 in)
- Positions: Right-back; winger

Team information
- Current team: Borneo Samarinda

Youth career
- 2010–2012: Villa 2000
- 2013–2014: CFR Cluj
- 2014: Niendorfer TSV

Senior career*
Years	Team	Apps	(Gls)
2014–2016	Mitra Kukar	0	(0)
2016	Borneo	11	(0)
2017–2019	Barito Putera	69	(9)
2020–2022	Bali United	11	(0)
2022–2024	Persis Solo	41	(1)
2024–	Borneo Samarinda	4	(0)
2025–2026	→ Persik Kediri (loan)	0	(0)

International career
2011–2012	Indonesia U16	7	(2)
2013	Indonesia U19	4	(0)
2017–2018	Indonesia U23	9	(2)
2017–2019	Indonesia	8	(0)
Medal record
Men's football
Representing Indonesia
Southeast Asian Games
Bronze medal – third place	2017 Kuala Lumpur	Team
- * Club domestic league appearances and goals as of 23 May 2025

Gavin Kwan Adsit (born 5 April 1996) is an Indonesian professional footballer who plays for Super League club Borneo Samarinda. Mainly a right-back, he can also play as a winger.

== Personal life ==
Gavin was born in Kerobokan, Badung Regency, Bali to an American father, John Adsit and Javanese-Chinese Indonesians descent mother, Maria Yosephine.

== International career ==
In August 2011, Gavin was called up to the Indonesia U16 for 2012 AFC U-16 Championship qualification in Thailand. On 12 September 2011, he started and debuted for the youth team in a 4–1 win against Myanmar U16 in the 2012 AFC U-16 Championship qualification where he also scored his first goal in the 8th minute. Gavin made his international debut for the senior team on 8 June 2017, against Cambodia. He scored his debut goal for the senior team on 4 December 2017, against Mongolia.

== Career statistics ==
=== Club ===
As of match played 23 May 2025

Club	Season	League		Cup (Note: Includes Piala Indonesia)		Continental (Note: Appearances in AFC Cup, AFC Champions League)		Other (Note: Appearances in Indonesia President's Cup)		Total	
Club	Season	Apps	Goals	Apps	Goals	Apps	Goals	Apps	Goals	Apps	Goals
Borneo	2016	11	0	0	0	–		0	0	11	0
Barito Putera	2017	19	5	0	0	–		1	0	20	5
Barito Putera	2018	21	0	2	1	–		1	0	24	1
Barito Putera	2019	29	4	0	0	–		2	3	31	7
Barito Putera	Total	69	9	2	1	0	0	4	3	75	13
Bali United	2020	1	0	0	0	5	0	0	0	6	0
Bali United	2021–22	10	0	0	0	–		2 (Note: Appearances in Menpora Cup)	0	12	0
Bali United	Total	11	0	0	0	5	0	2	0	18	0
Persis Solo	2022–23	28	1	0	0	–		2	0	30	1
Persis Solo	2023–24	13	0	0	0	–		0	0	13	0
Persis Solo	Total	41	1	0	0	–		2	0	43	1
Borneo Samarinda	2024–25	4	0	0	0	–		1 (Note: Appearances in ASEAN Club Championship)	1	5	1
Persik Kediri (loan)	2025–26	0	0	0	0	–		0	0	0	0
Career total		136	10	2	1	5	0	9	4	152	15

=== International ===
As of match played 19 November 2019

Appearances and goals by national team and year
National team	Year	Apps	Goals
Indonesia	2017	3	0
Indonesia	2018	3	0
Indonesia	2019	2	0
Total		8	0

=== International under-23 goals ===
#	Date	Venue	Opponent	Score	Result	Competition
1.	21 July 2017	National Stadium, Bangkok, Thailand	Mongolia	3–0	7–0	2018 AFC U-23 Championship qualification
2.	21 July 2017	National Stadium, Bangkok, Thailand	Mongolia	6–0	7–0	2018 AFC U-23 Championship qualification

== Honours ==
=== Club ===
Bali United

- Liga 1: 2021–22

=== International ===
Indonesia U-23

- SEA Games bronze medal: 2017

Indonesia

- Aceh World Solidarity Cup runner-up: 2017

=== Individual ===
- Liga 1 Best XI: 2017
