= Kalu dodol =

Type of dodol popular in Sri Lanka

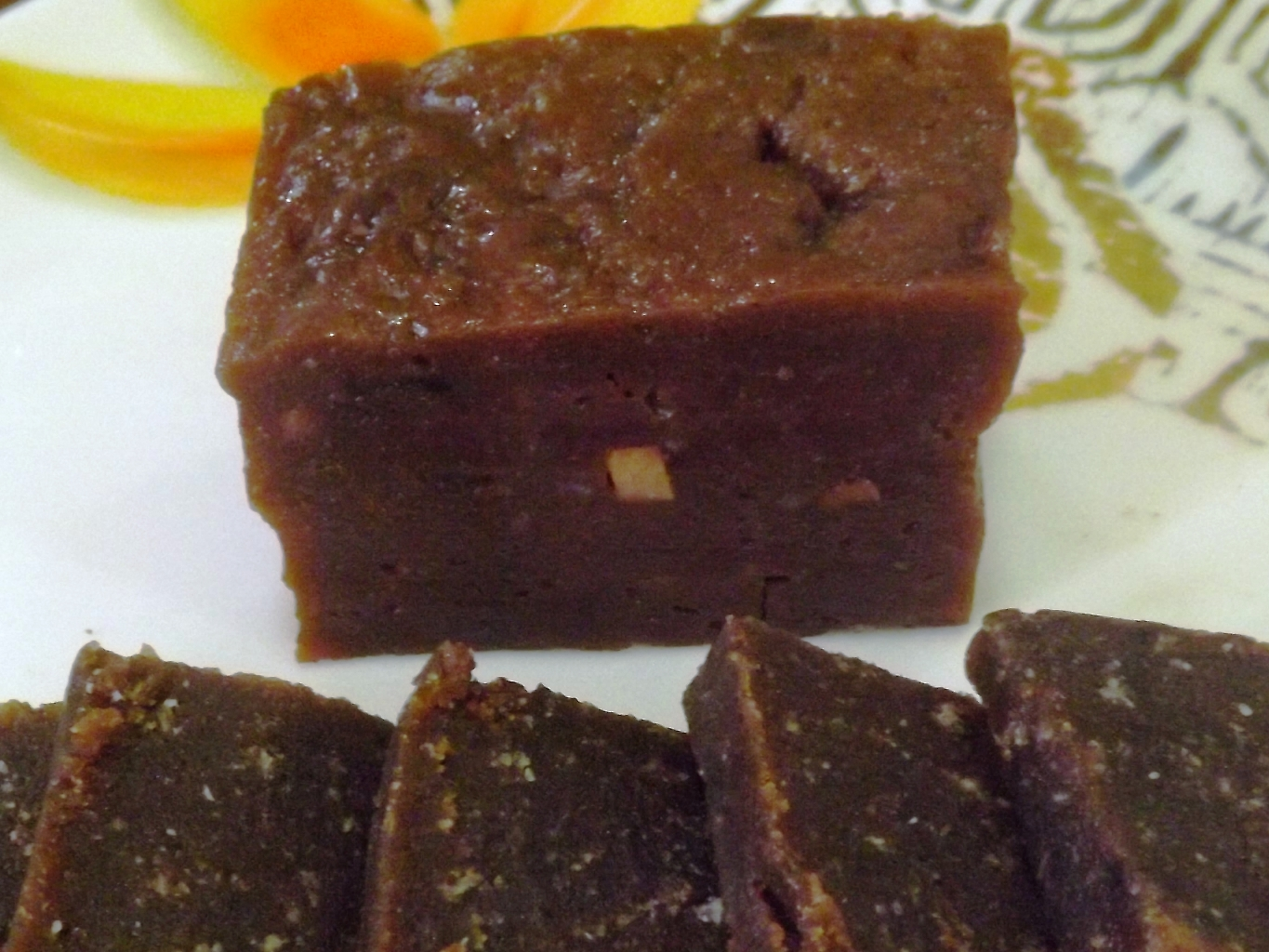
- Alternative names: Dodol
- Course: Dessert
- Place of origin: Sri Lanka, derived from the Indonesian dodol
- Serving temperature: Cooled
- Main ingredients: Jaggery, Rice flour, Coconut milk
- Variations: Moor Dodol

Kalu dodol (Sinhala: කලු දොදොල්, Tamil: தொதல்) is a sweet dish, a type of dodol that is popular in Sri Lanka. The dark and sticky dish consists mainly of kithul jaggery (from the sap of the toddy palm), rice flour and coconut milk. It is difficult and time-consuming to prepare. The Hambanthota area is known for the production of this dish.

== Origins and history ==
Kalu dodol is believed to have been introduced to Sri Lanka by the Sri Lankan Malays, It has also been attributed to the Portuguese, who occupied parts of the country during the 16th and 17th centuries. With the introduction of artificial ingredients the preparation of kalu dodol has occasionally deviated from the traditional recipes.

Kalu dodol, along with other traditional sweets, is commonly prepared and consumed in celebration of the Sinhala New Year.

=== Kalu dodol capital ===
Hambanthota is famous for its kalu dodol industry

The Hambanthota area in southern Sri Lanka is known for kalu dodol, and is sometimes referred to as the kalu dodol capital. The kalu dodol industry is a major source of income for many people in the area.

The kalu dodol shops in Hambanthota are frequently visited by pilgrims coming to visit the nearby religious site of Kataragama. In 2011, the Sri Lankan government allocated Rs. 134 million for setting up kalu dodol sales centres in the Hambanthota area, in an effort to develop the industry.

== Description ==
The main ingredients of kalu dodol are kithul jaggery (from the treacle of the Caryota urens plant), rice flour and coconut milk. Other ingredients such as cashews, cardamom and raisins may be added. It is dark brown in colour and is a thick, sticky and sweet jelly-like dish with a "slightly granulated" texture.

To make the dish, kithul jaggery and thin coconut milk are boiled and rice flour, thick coconut milk and other ingredients are added. After cooking it is poured into a tray, pressed, and left to cool. This labour-intensive process can take up to nine hours.
