= Lycée Français de Bali =

Lycée Français de Bali Sekolah Perancis Bali
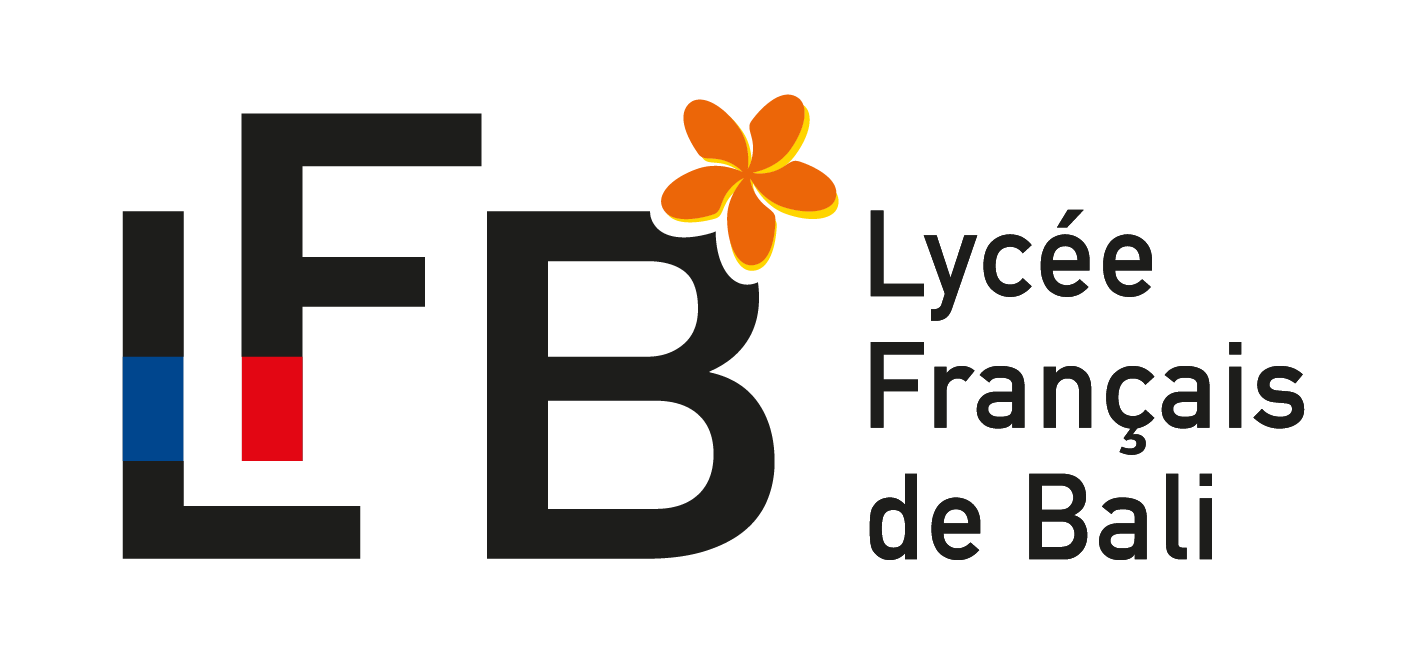

Location
- Jalan Umalas Kauh No.76, Kuta, Kerobokan Kelod, North Kuta, Badung Regency, Bali 80117; Kerobokan, Badung Regency, Bali; Indonesia
- Coordinates: 8.669106°S 115.155619°E

Information
- Established: 1 September 1991
- Website: lfbali.com

Lycée Français de Bali Louis Antoine de Bougainville (LFB, Indonesian: Sekolah Perancis Bali), also known as the École Internationale Française de Bali (EIFB) before 2016, is a French international school in Kerobokan, Bali, Indonesia. It serves maternelle (preschool) through the terminale (final year) of the lycée (senior high school).

The school first opened on 1 September 1991. High school classes began in 2009, with terminale (final year) classes starting in 2011.

As of 2016 the school has about 350 students.
