= Odalan =

Indonesian traditional festival

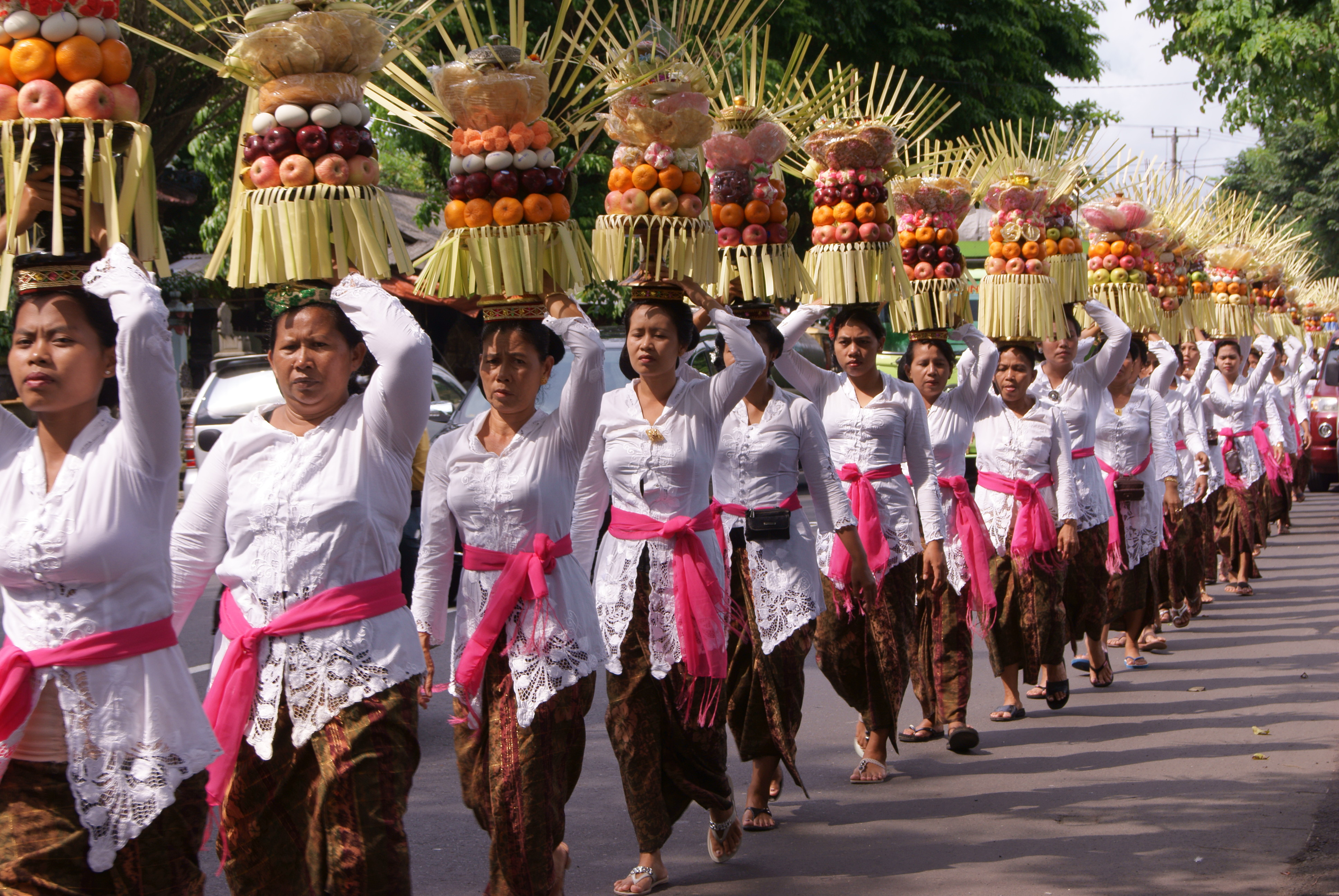
An Odalan procession

An Odalan or Piodalan (Balinese script: ᬧᬶᬬᭀᬤᬮᬦ᭄) is a Balinese village temple festival in Indonesia. It is an occasion when the Hindu village community comes together, invites the gods to visit them for three or more days, perform religious services together offering refreshments and entertainment. It is a periodic event, one that celebrates Balinese Hindu heritage and performance arts. The Odalan celebrations are a social occasion among Indonesian Hindus, and have historically contributed to the rich tradition of theatre and Balinese dance forms.

An Odalan marks the founding of a particular Hindu temple, and is celebrated on its birthday according to the Pawukon – the 210 day Balinese calendar. Since Bali has thousands of Hindu temples, with at least three in each village, several Odalan are celebrated in some part of Bali almost every day of the Gregorian calendar. The celebration rituals are called Dewa Yadnya (Sanskrit: Deva Yajna), includes processions, decorations of the village temple, entertainment and dancing in the temple courtyard, the village community pools its resources and observes it together.

The Odalan at a few large temples, such as the Pura Besakih - the biggest Hindu temple in Bali, has major cultural importance beyond its location. It is an island wide event, and therefore celebrated with major preparations once every 100 Balinese years.

== See also ==
- Galungan
- Gamelan
- Nyepi
