= Penjor =

Balinese Hindu religious symbol

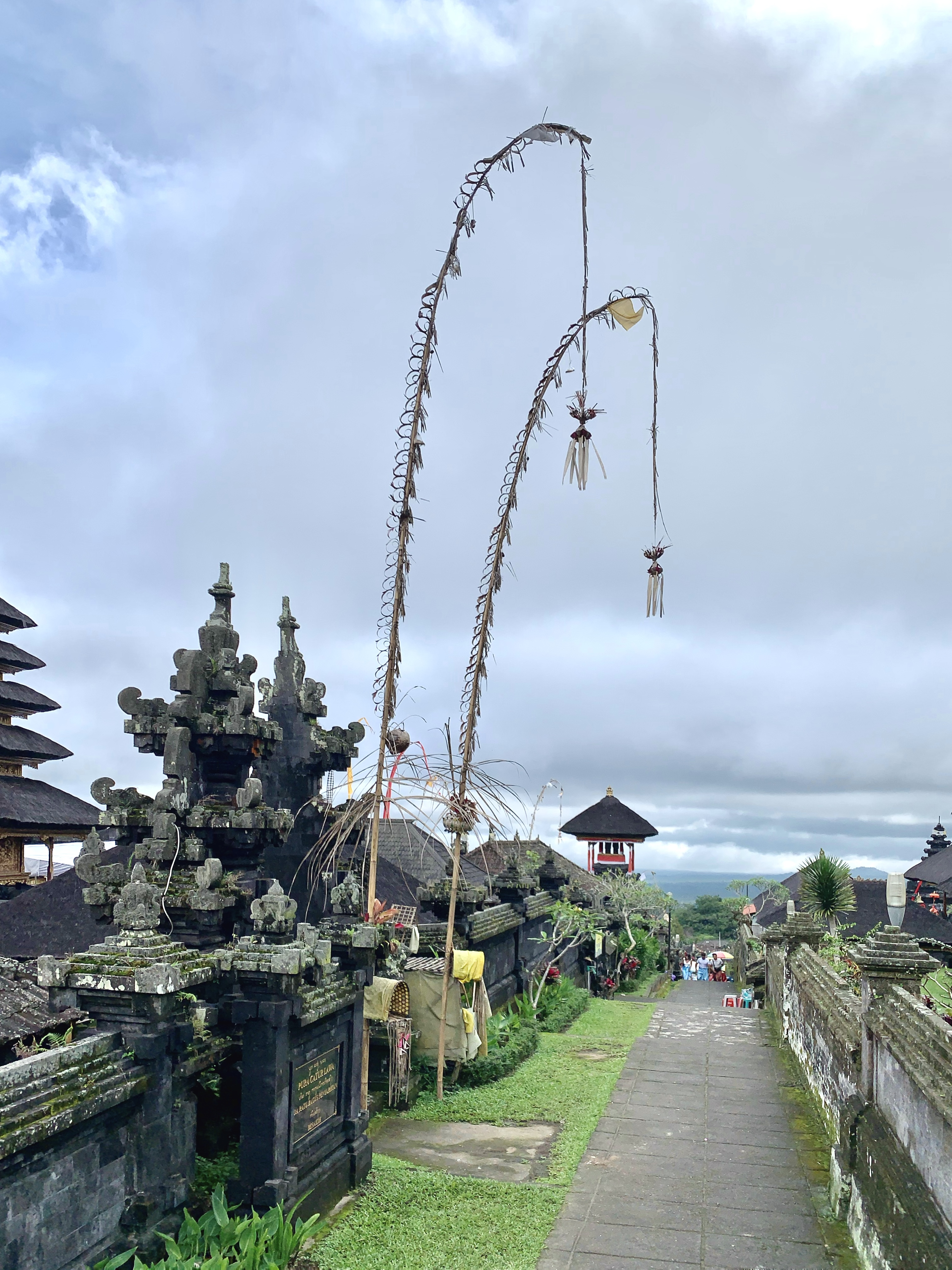
A pair of penjors in the Besakih Temple Complex

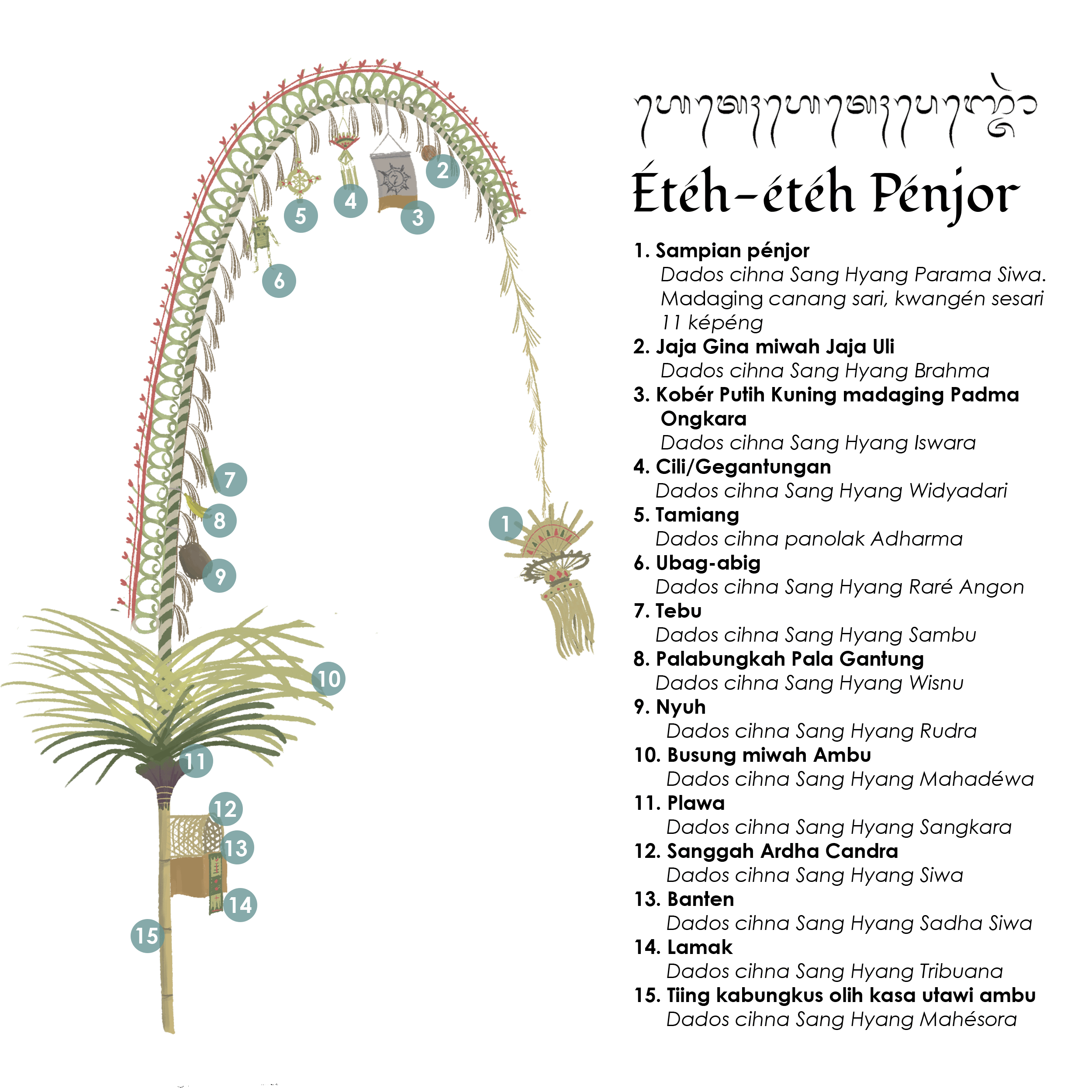
Symbolism in Penjor parts

A penjor (Balinese: ᬧᬾᬜ᭄ᬚᭀᬃ) is a Balinese Hindu religious symbol of prosperity installed on the day of the Galungan ceremony. Its form is of a tall, decorated bamboo pole and can be seen across Bali year-round in front of homes, compounds and are part of temple anniversary celebrations as well almost every other important religious ceremony and Hindu life-cycle rituals. They are also a key feature of modern penjor festivals.

The poles vary in length but are typically 5-10 meters in height with a distinctive curve near its upper portion. The penjor is said to resemble both the tail of the barong, a symbol of the goodness, and the peak of the sacred mountain Mount Agung. Their decoration schemes range from simple to exquisite using yellow coconut leaves and a variety of other symbolic materials such as pala bungkah (sweet potato) roots, pala gantung (cucumbers, oranges, bananas), pala wija (rice, corn), plawa (leaves), traditional cakes, and coins. Some penjors are created as permanent installations. At the base of the penjor a small shrine is attached, which is decorated with a lamak.

== See also ==
- Balinese Hinduism
- Penjor Festival
- Galungan
- Kuningan (Bali)
