= Kerobokan =

- Village
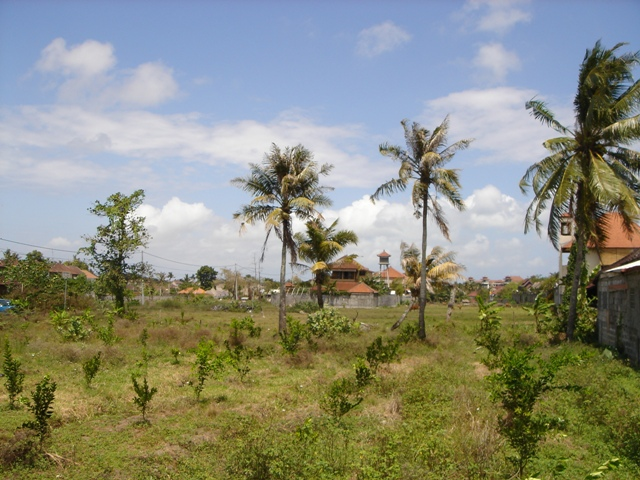
- Kerobokan village

- Location within Bali
- Coordinates: 8°40′22″S 115°10′00″E
- Country: Indonesia
- Province: Bali

Kerobokan is a kelurahan (administrative village) in North Kuta district, Badung Regency, Bali, Indonesia. Kerobokan Prison is located there. It is boxed in by the Seminyak/Oberoi, Umalas/Canggu, and Denpasar regions. Near the main intersection (named Lio Square), there is a night market selling local foods and other products.

The Lycée Français de Bali, the French international school, is in the town.

AIS Indonesia, the Australian international school system, had its AIS Bali campus here.

For art exhibitions, BIASA ArtSpace by Susanna Perini next to the Lio Premium store often holds artist showcases in collaboration with other galleries.
