= Janur =

Young leaf of palm trees

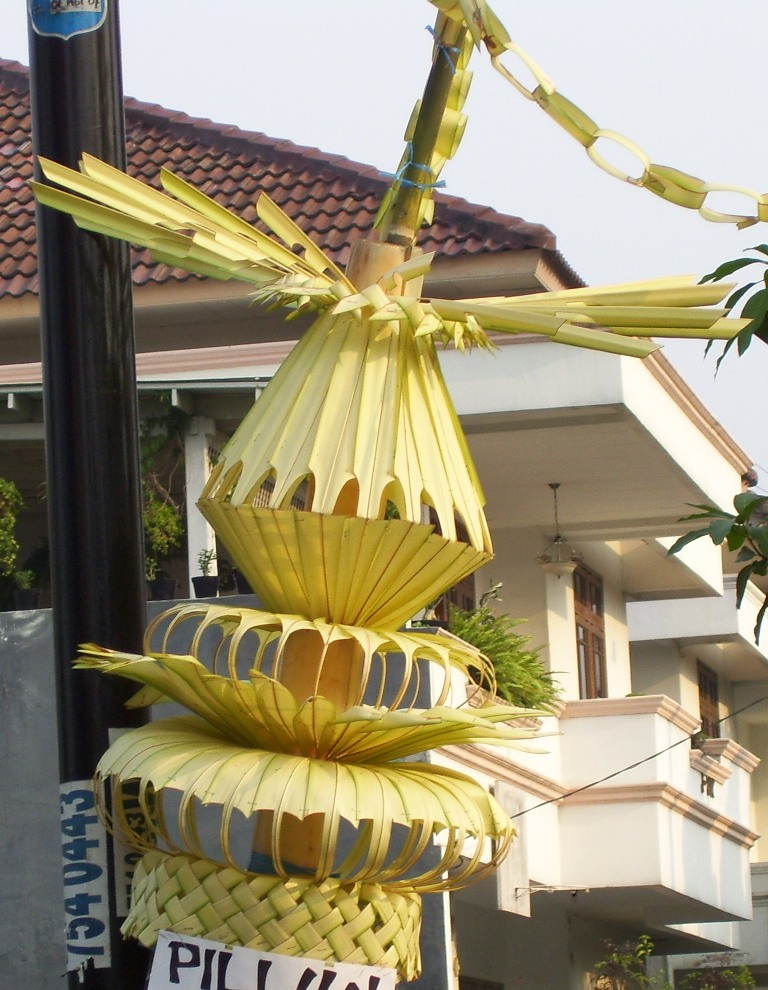
Janur

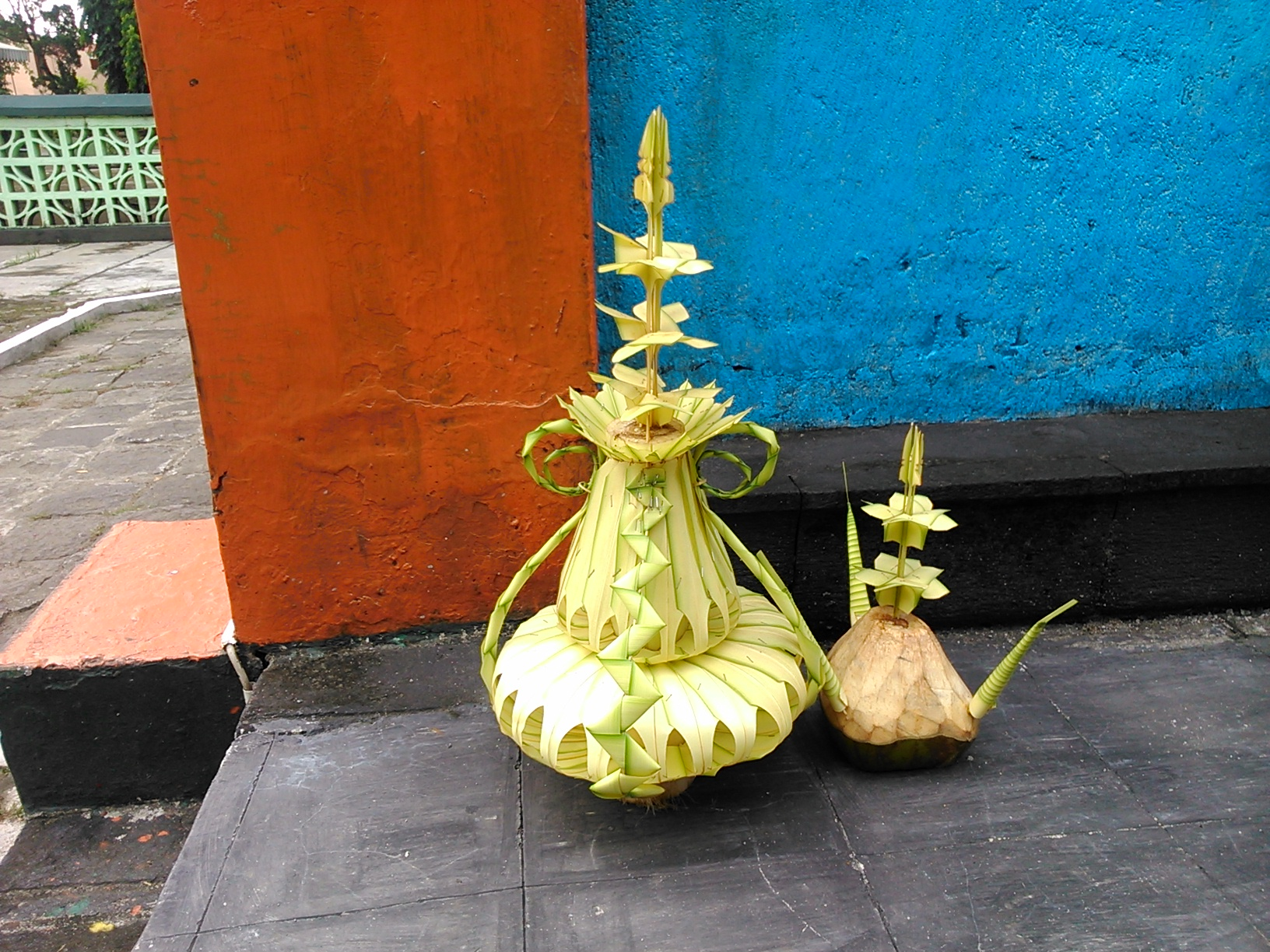
Kembar mayang is a janur arrangement usually placed in pairs at Javanese wedding ceremonies. It symbolizes prosperity and togetherness.

Janur (from Javanese language ꦗꦤꦸꦂ) is a young leaf of big palm tree, especially coconut, sugar palm (Arenga pinnata) and sago palm (Metroxylon rumphii or Metroxylon sagu). Janur is used as a tool by various ethnic groups in Indonesia as part of their daily lives. It is also called yellow coconut leaf, although the colour could be light green or whitish green. Janur placed in the roadside at a single bamboo adorned with complicated plaits indicates that a wedding party is being held in the street where it is erected.
