= Susanna Perini =

Susanna Perini is a fashion designer and art collector based in Bali, Indonesia. She is the founder of fashion label BIASA and art institution BIASA ArtSpace. Her great contribution to the development of fashion and art in Indonesia merited her a knighthood of the Order of Merit of the Republic by the Italian government in 2017.

== Early years ==
Born to a family of couturiers in Rome, Italy, Susanna Perini was already exposed to sartorial craftsmanship since a very young age. After finishing her bachelor's degree, Perini took up photography and went to Bali, Indonesia, for an assignment by weekly magazine IO Donna. The young Italian was inspired by the culture of the tropical island, from the various ceremonies to the details related to the customs and traditional clothing pieces. She made Bali home and married American designer Paul Ropp there. After giving birth to two children, Nova Ropp and Sayang Ropp, they went separate ways.

== Fashion design ==
In 1994, Perini opened the first BIASA store in Seminyak, championing chic tropical style with white linen fabrics. To date, the brand grew with six stores in Bali and one store in Kemang, South Jakarta.

== Art ==
Inspired by her dialogues with Indonesian artists, Perini opened BIASA ArtSpace in 2005. The institution exists to get recognition for Indonesian artists from art collectors in and from outside Indonesia.

Through BIASA ArtSpace, Perini helped translate and publish some literary reviews by notable Italian art critic Achille Bonita Oliva. The publication titles include "Thisoriented. 2nd Stage" (2009), a review on art photographer Matteo Basilé's exhibition at BIASA ArtSpace, and "Art Beyond The Year Two Thousand" (2011), a sharp observation on the world of arts after 2000.
