= Galungan =

Balinese holiday in the Pawukon calendar

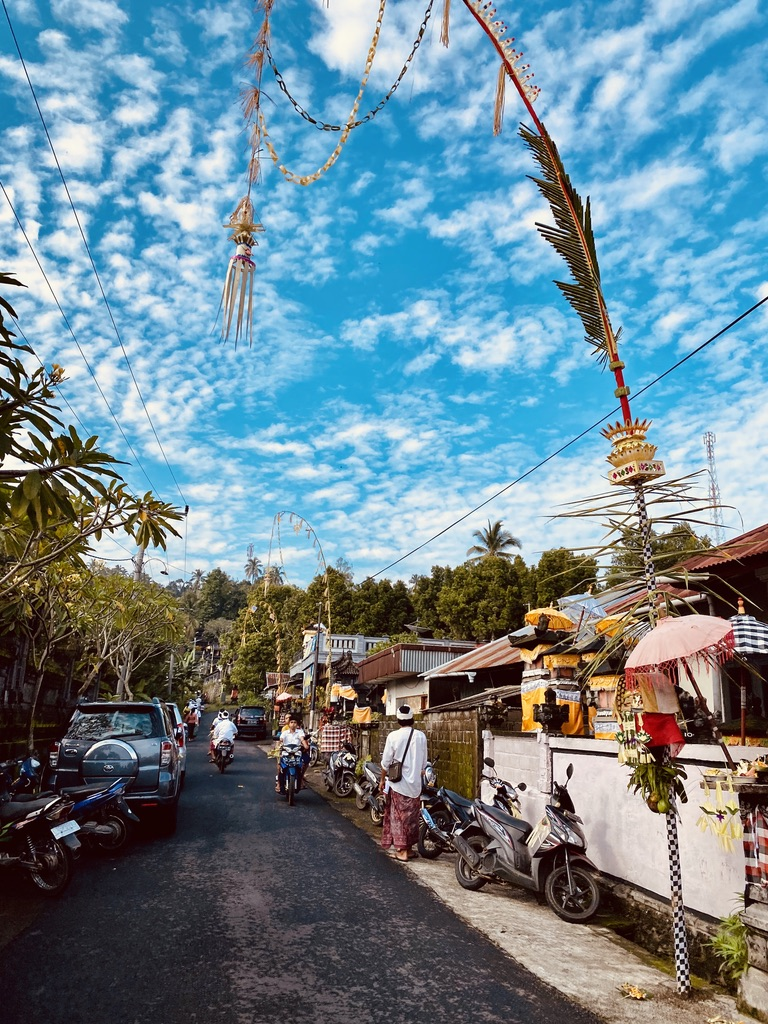
- Penjor lining a road in Bali at Galungan
- Also called: Galungan
- Observed by: Balinese Hindus
- Type: Hindu
- Observances: Prayers, Religious rituals
- Date: Hindu Balinese pawukon Buda Keliwon Dunggulan

Galungan is a Balinese Hindu holiday celebrating the victory of dharma over adharma. It marks the time when the ancestral spirits visit the Earth. The last day of the celebration is Kuningan, when they return. The date is calculated according to the 210-day Balinese Pawukon calendar.

== Significance ==
Galungan marks the beginning of the most important recurring religious ceremonies. The spirits of deceased relatives who have died and been cremated return to visit their homelands, and the current inhabitants have a responsibility to be hospitable through prayers and offerings. The most obvious sign of the celebrations are the penjor - bamboo poles with offerings suspended at the end. These are installed by the side of roads. A number of days around the Kuningan day have special names, and are marked by the organization of particular activities.

	Name of day	Activities
3 days before	Penyekeban	Cooking of bananas for offerings
2 days before	Penyajaan	Making of jaja (fried rice cakes)
1 day before	Penampahan	Slaughtering of pigs or chicken for feasts
1 day after	Manis Galungan	Visiting family
10 days after	Kuningan	Prayers, offerings - spirits return to heaven
11 days after	Manis Kuningan	Fun

== Dates ==
Galungan begins on the Wednesday (Buda), the 11th week of the 210-day pawukon calendar. This means that there are often two celebrations per solar year. Dates for 2018-2025 are as follows:

Year	Galungan	Kuningan
2018	May 30	June 9
2018-2019	December 26	January 5
2019	July 24	August 3
2020	February 19	February 29
2020	September 16	September 26
2021	April 14	April 24
2021	November 10	November 20
2022	June 8	June 18
2023	January 4	January 14
2023	August 2	August 12
2024	February 28	March 9
2024	September 25	October 5
2025	April 23	May 3
2025	November 19	November 29
2026	June 17	June 27
2027	January 13	January 23
2027	August 11	August 21
2028	March 8	March 18
2028	October 4	October 14
2029	May 2	May 12
2029	November 28	December 8
2030	June 26	July 6
