= Indian Indonesian cuisine =

Cuisine of the people of Indian-Indonesians

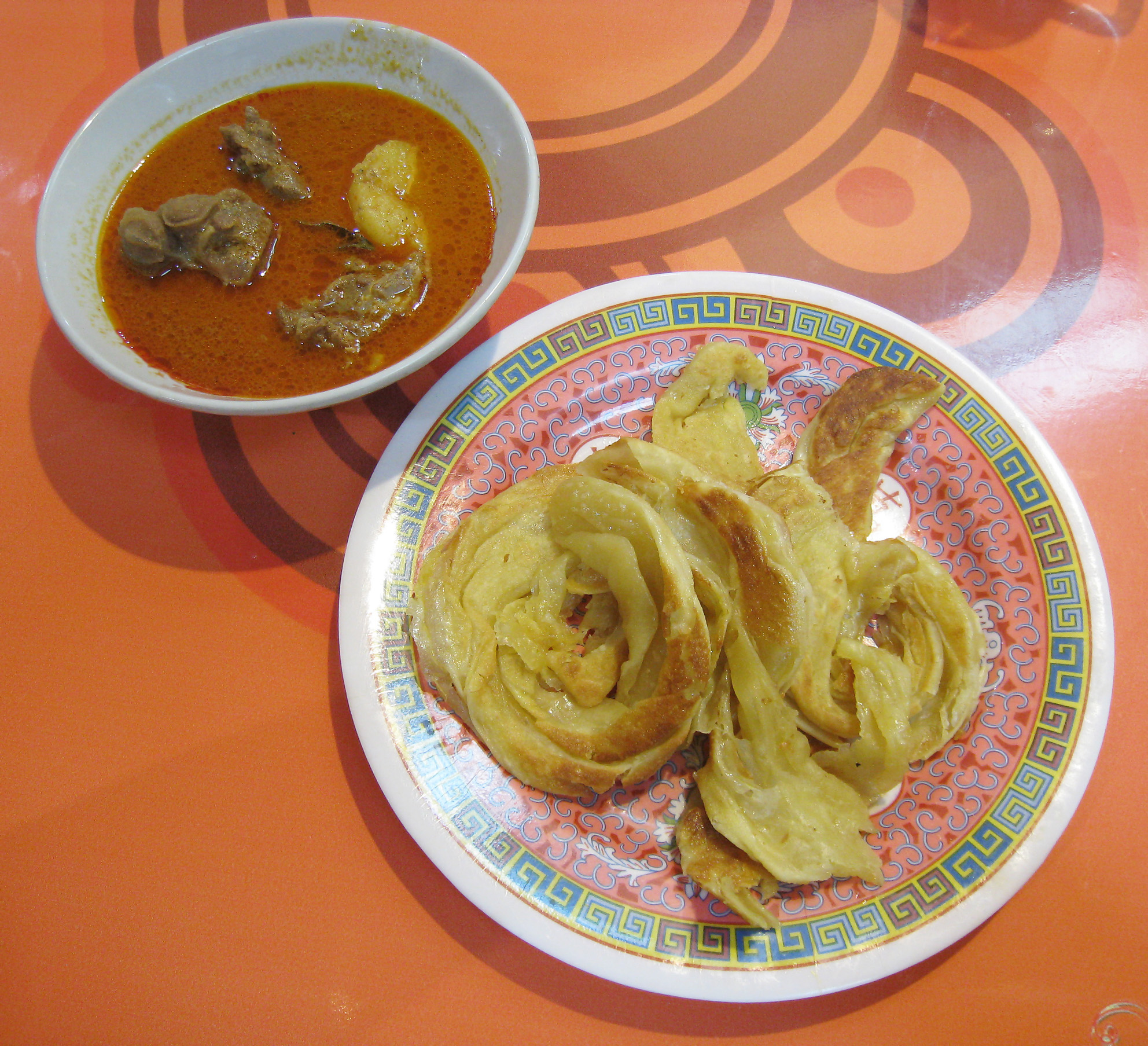
Roti canai and mutton curry, Indian influence on Indonesian cuisine.

Indian Indonesian cuisine (Indonesian: Masakan India-Indonesia) is characterized by the mixture of Indian cuisine with local Indonesian-style. This cuisine consists of adaptations of authentic dishes from India, as well as original creations inspired by the diverse food culture of Indonesia. Indian influence can be observed in Indonesia as early as the 4th century. Following the spread of Islam to Indonesia and trading, Muslim Indian as well as Arab influences made their way into Indonesian cuisine. Examples include Indian biryani, murtabak, curry and paratha that influenced Acehnese, Minangkabau, Malay, Palembangese, Betawi and Javanese cuisine.

== History ==
See influence of Indian cuisine in Indonesia, due to Indianisation as part of Greater India as Southeast Asia have been historically influenced by the Indian culture, religion and cuisine.

== List of Indian Indonesian foods ==
This list also includes Indonesian dishes that has experienced of acculturation or assimilation to Indian cuisine.

=== Dishes ===
- Apem, a traditional cake of steamed dough made of rice flour, coconut milk, yeast and palm sugar, usually served with grated coconut.
- Ayam tandori, chicken marinated in a mixture of spices and yoghurt and cooked in a clay oven.
- Chapati, a thin and unleavened flatbread originating from India, brought by the Indian immigrant to the country.
- Chutney, a family of condiments that usually contain some mixture of spices, vegetables or fruits. Chutneys may be either wet or dry, and can have a coarse to a fine texture.
- Dosa, rice pancake dish.
- Gulai, curry dish with main ingredients might be poultry, goat meat, beef, mutton, various kinds of offal, fish and seafood, and also vegetables such as cassava leaves and unripe jackfruit.
- Idli, savoury rice cake with patty-shaped. Most often eaten at breakfast or as snack. It usually served in pairs with chutney, sambar or other accompaniments.
- Kari ayam, chicken curry.
- Kari domba, mutton curry.
- Kari kambing, goat curry.
- Kari kepala ikan, fish head curry.
- Kari udang, shrimp curry.
- Korma, chicken or mutton braised with a medley of ground spices, nuts, and coconut milk or grated coconut.
- Laksa, spicy noodle dish.
- Mi aceh, Acehnese curry noodle, it can be fried or soupy.
- Mi kari, curry noodle.
- Martabak HAR, an egg-murtabak served in curry and topped with chillies in sweet-sour soy.
- Murtabak, stuffed pancake or pan-fried bread, sometimes filled with beef and scallions.
- Naan, a leavened, oven-baked flatbread. It is usually eaten with an array of sauces such as curries.
- Nasi biryani, a flavoured rice dish cooked or served with mutton, chicken, vegetable or fish curry.
- Nasi kari, rice and curry.
- Nasi kabuli palaw, a pilaf rice dish, consists of steamed rice mixed with raisins, carrots, and beef or lamb.
- Nasi kebuli, steamed rice dish cooked in goat broth, milk, and ghee. Usually served during Mawlid.
- Raita, a condiment made of yogurt, together with raw or cooked vegetables, more seldom fruit, or in the case of boondi raita, with fried droplets of batter made from gram flour.
- Rendang, spicy meat curry dish originating from the Minangkabau.
- Roti canai, heavy Indian-influenced paratha-like roti served with curry or other condiments.
- Roti jala, pancake like dish, commonly served with curry dishes
- Roti tisu, thinner version of the traditional roti canai.
- Sambar, a lentil-based vegetable stew or chowder.
- Satti Sorru:Indian claypot rice
- Soto, a traditional soup mainly composed of broth, meat and vegetables.
- Soto betawi, soto soup made of beef or beef offal, cooked in a cow milk or coconut milk broth and ghee, with fried potato and tomato.
- Tongseng, a dish of goat meat, mutton or beef stew dish in curry-like soup with vegetables and sweet soy sauce.

=== Snacks and desserts ===
- Adhirasam, sweets from Tamil cuisine.
- Halwa, sweet confectionery.
- Kheer, pudding that made by boiling milk, sugar, and rice, tapioca, vermicelli or sweet corn.
- Kue laddu, ball-shaped sweets.
- Kue modak, rice flour dumplings stuffed with coconut and gula jawa.
- Kue putu, traditional cylindrical-shaped and green-colored steamed cake.
- Kue putu mayang, string hoppers with palm sugar syrup mixed with coconut milk.
- Kue pinyaram, Indian-influenced Minangkabau traditional cake made from mixture of white sugar or palm sugar, white rice flour or black rice, and coconut milk.
- Samosa, a fried or baked dumpling with a savoury filling, such as spiced potatoes, onions, peas, or lentils.

=== Beverages ===
- Kopi tarik, a coffee, dark roasted with margarine and sugar, which is sweetened with condensed milk and pulled to froth it up.
- Teh tarik, hot milk tea beverage.

== Gallery ==
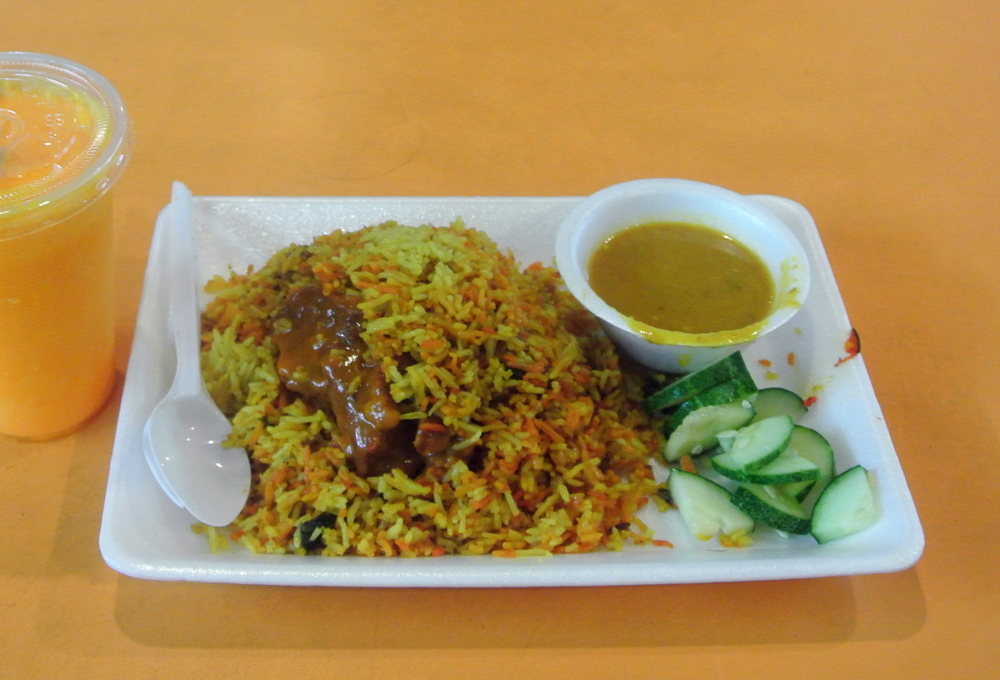
Nasi biryani

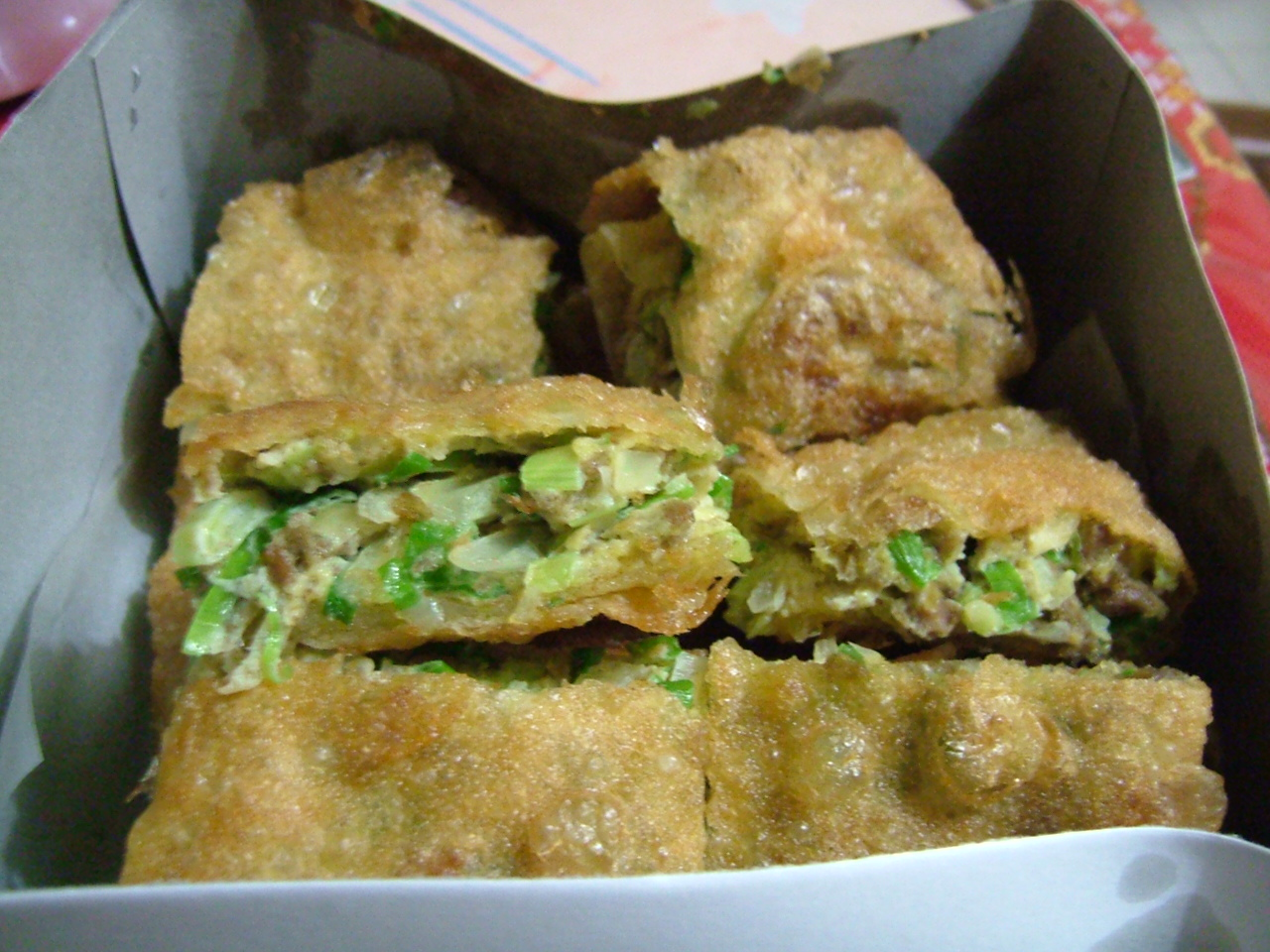
Murtabak

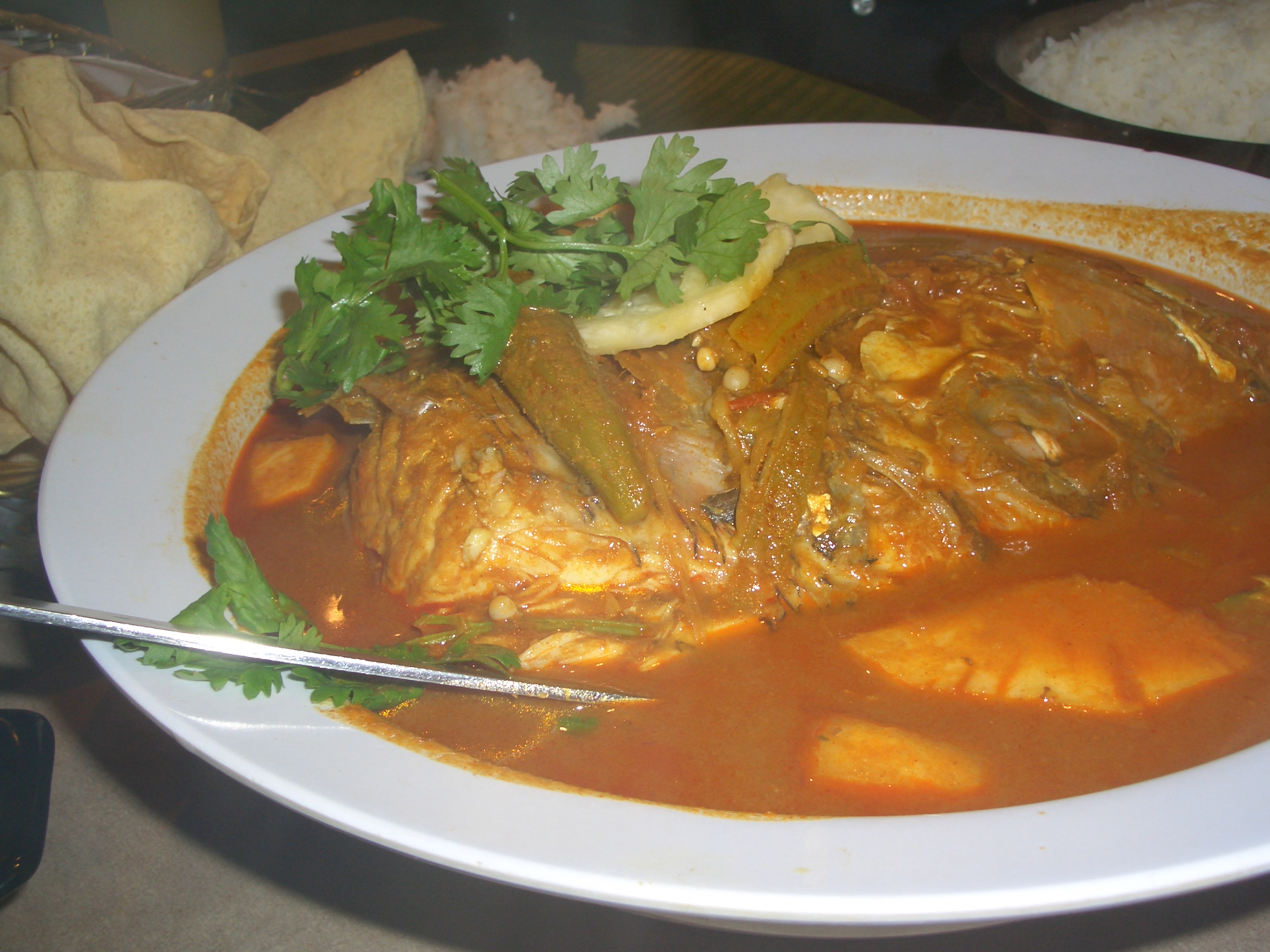
Kari kepala ikan

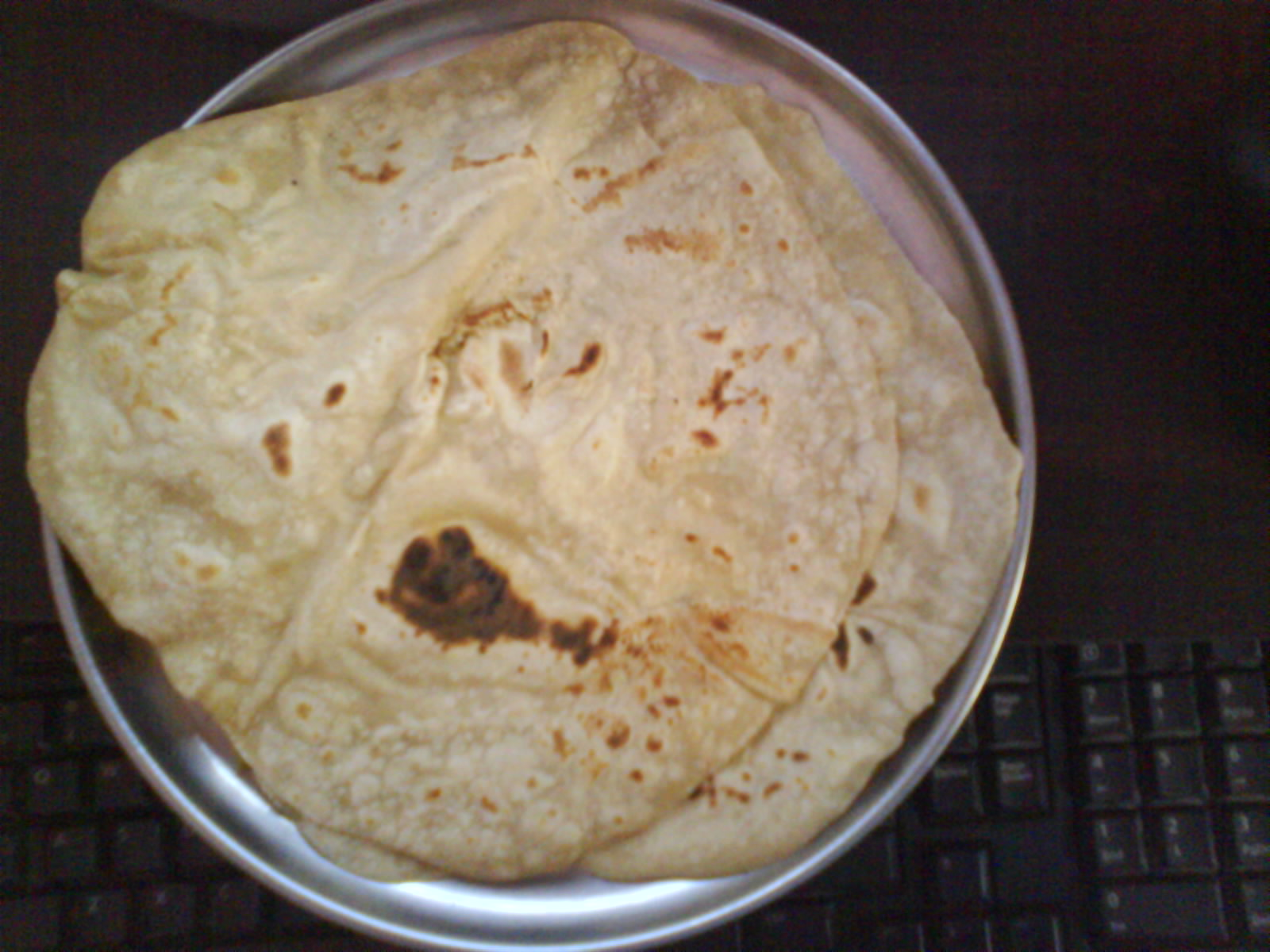
Chapati

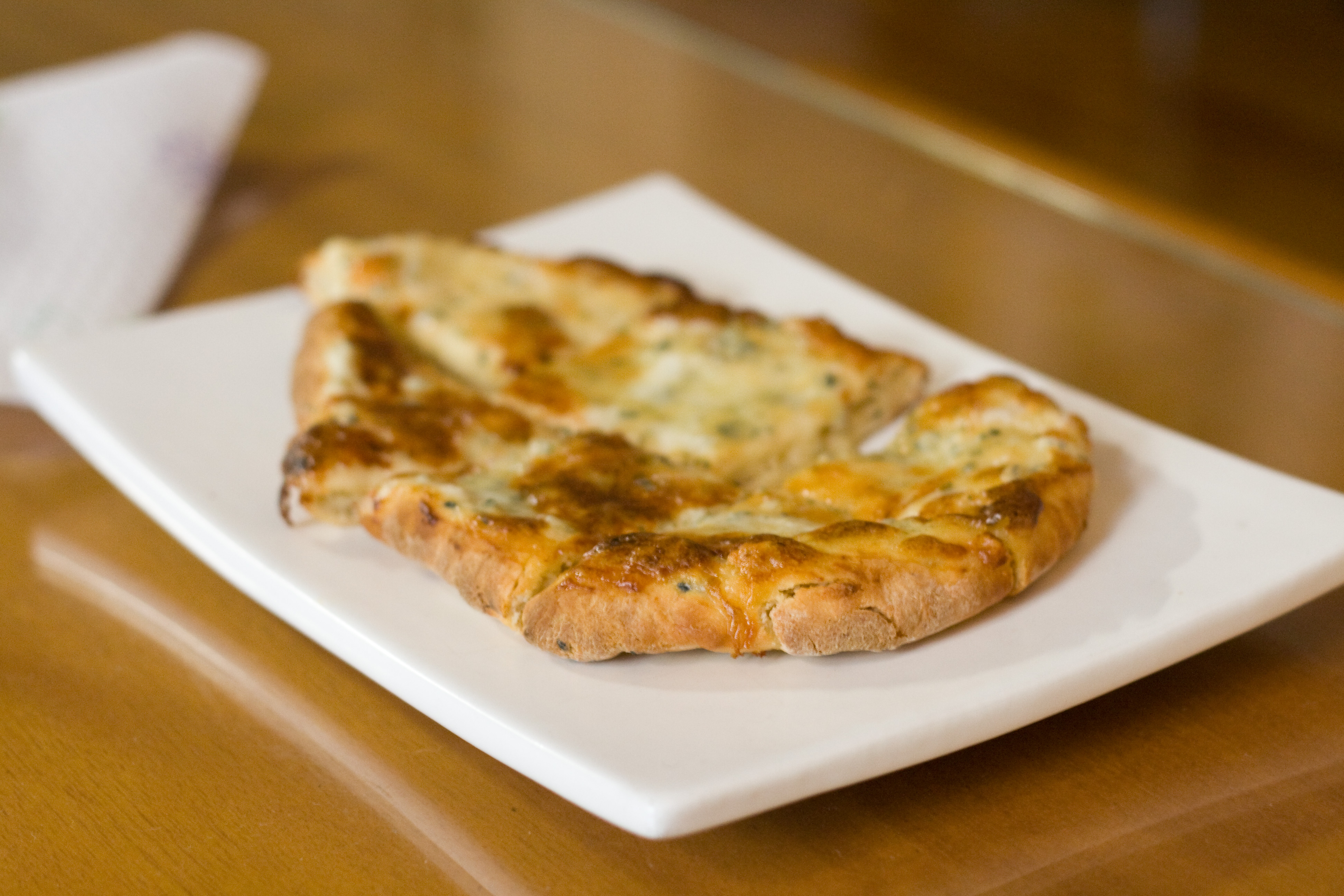
Naan

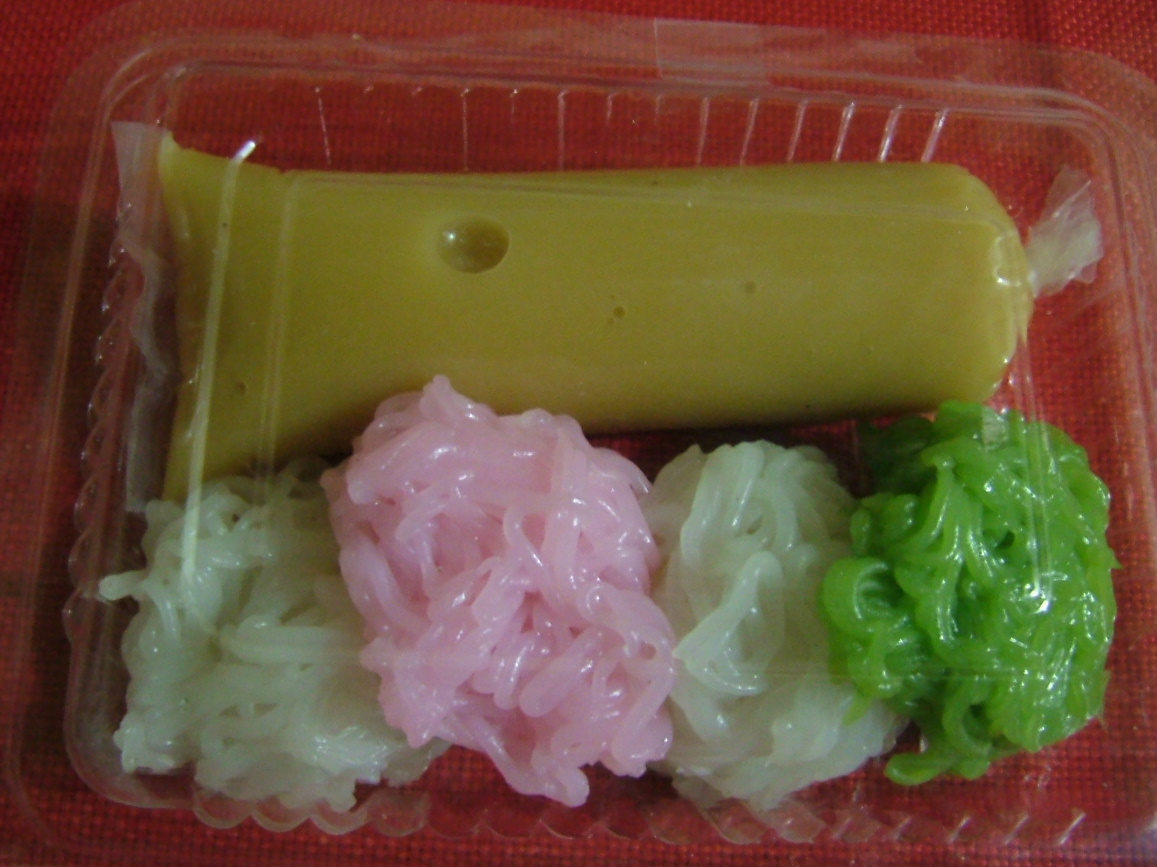
Putu mayang

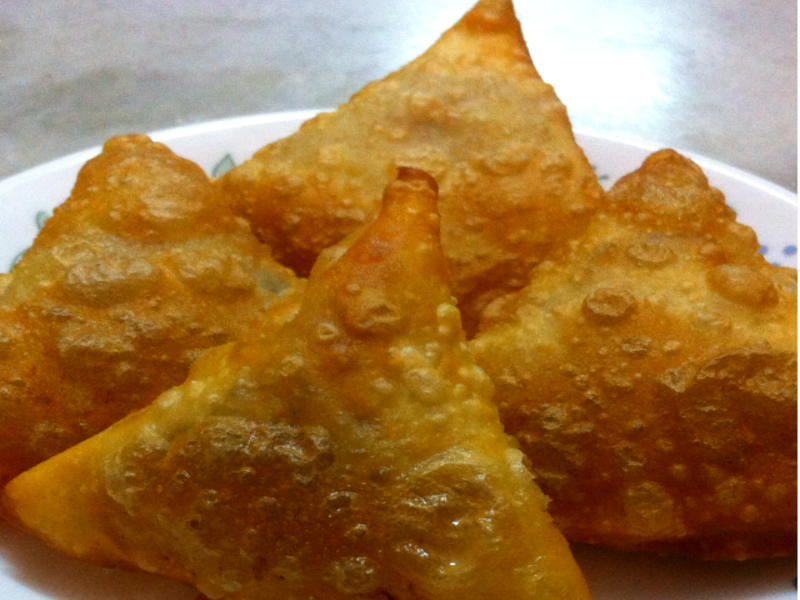
Samosa

== See also ==
- Cuisine of Indonesia
- List of Indonesian dishes
- Indian Indonesian
