= Fish head (disambiguation) =

A fish head is part of a fish's anatomy.

Fish head may also refer to:

- Fish's Head, a 1989 new wave album of songs by John Watts
- "Fish Heads" (song), a 1978 novelty song by Barnes & Barnes about things fish heads can and cannot do
- Fish heads as food, the head of a fish eaten as food
- Head of the Fish, a rowing race hosted by the Saratoga Rowing Association in New York State
- Slang for anyone in a Royal Navy uniform
