= Malu mirisata =

Spicy Sri Lankan fish curry

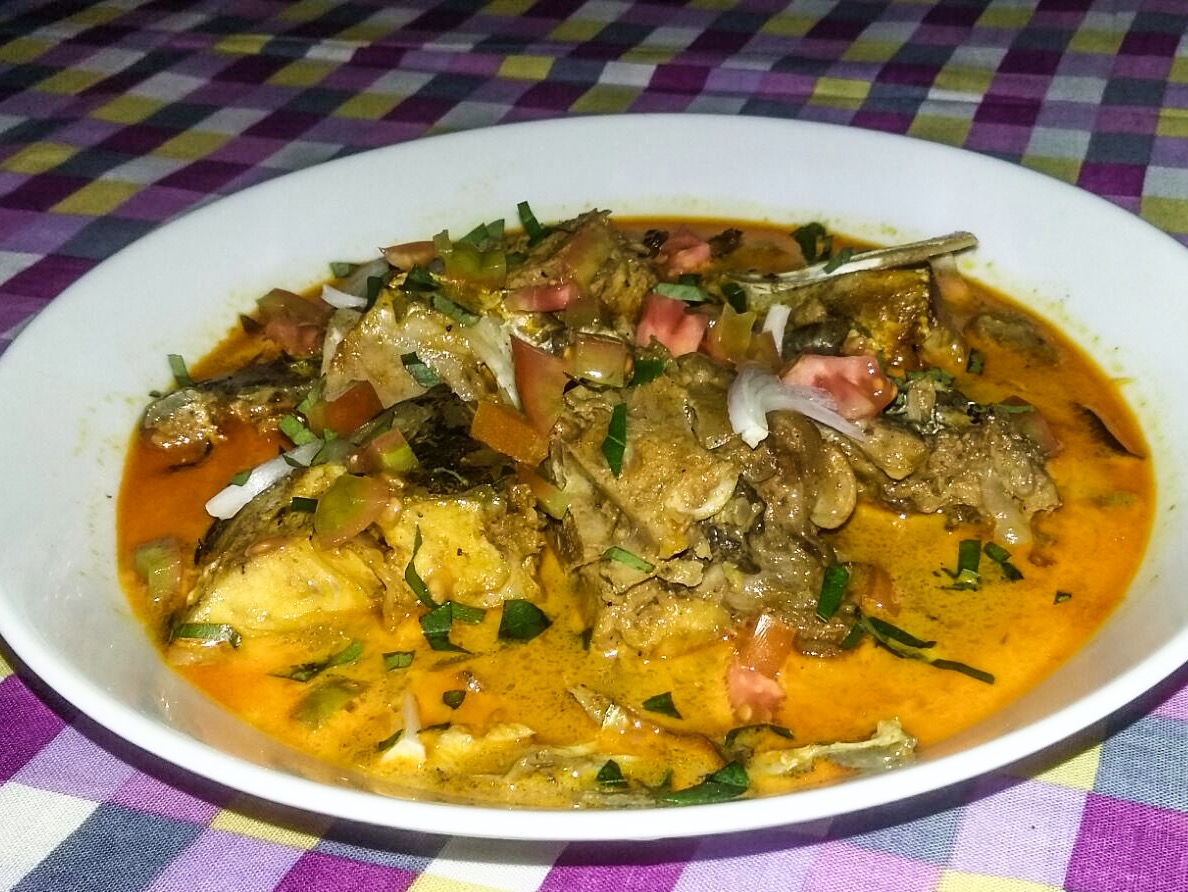
- Spicy Sri Lankan fish curry
- Type: Curry
- Place of origin: Sri Lanka
- Main ingredients: Fish, chili, onion, chili powder, turmeric, garlic, ginger

Malu mirisata is a spicy Sri Lankan fish curry with a chili flavor. The dish is popular around the country, mostly in seaboard areas where fish and other seafood are staple foods. Coconut milk is used in some variations of this dish. The dish is usually served with rice, bread or string hoppers.

== History ==
This method of cooking fish has its origin in Sri Lanka.

== Preparation ==
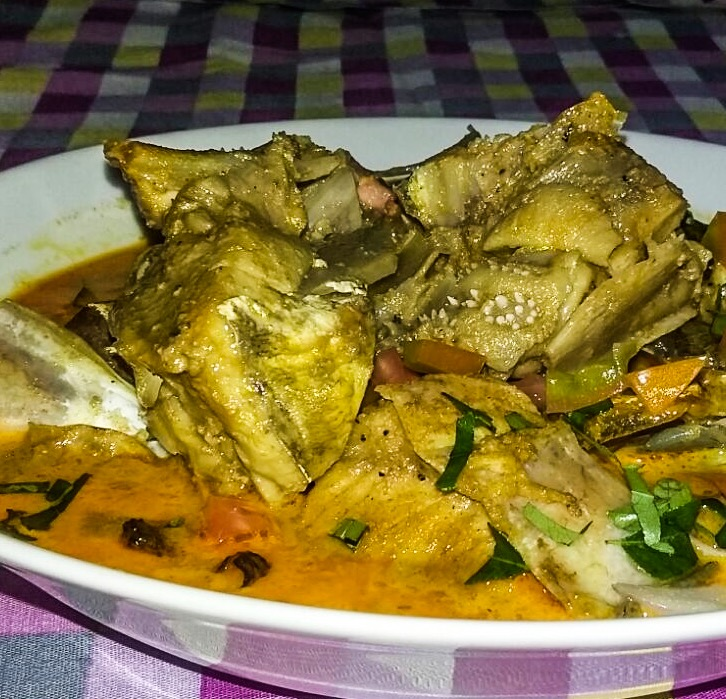
Spicy fish curry made in Sri Lanka

This is a very simple method of cooking fish with chili as a flavor, and using only a few ingredients. This curry is also mass-produced for consumer purchase in packages such as cans and flexible pouches.

== See also ==
- Fish curry (disambiguation)
- Cuisine of Sri Lanka
