= Fish heads as food =

Culinary ingredient

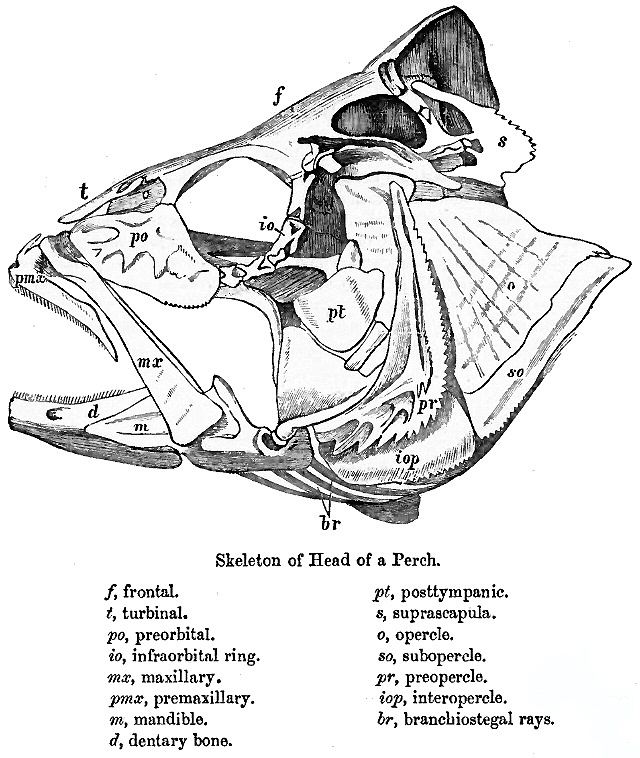
The skeleton of the head of a perch

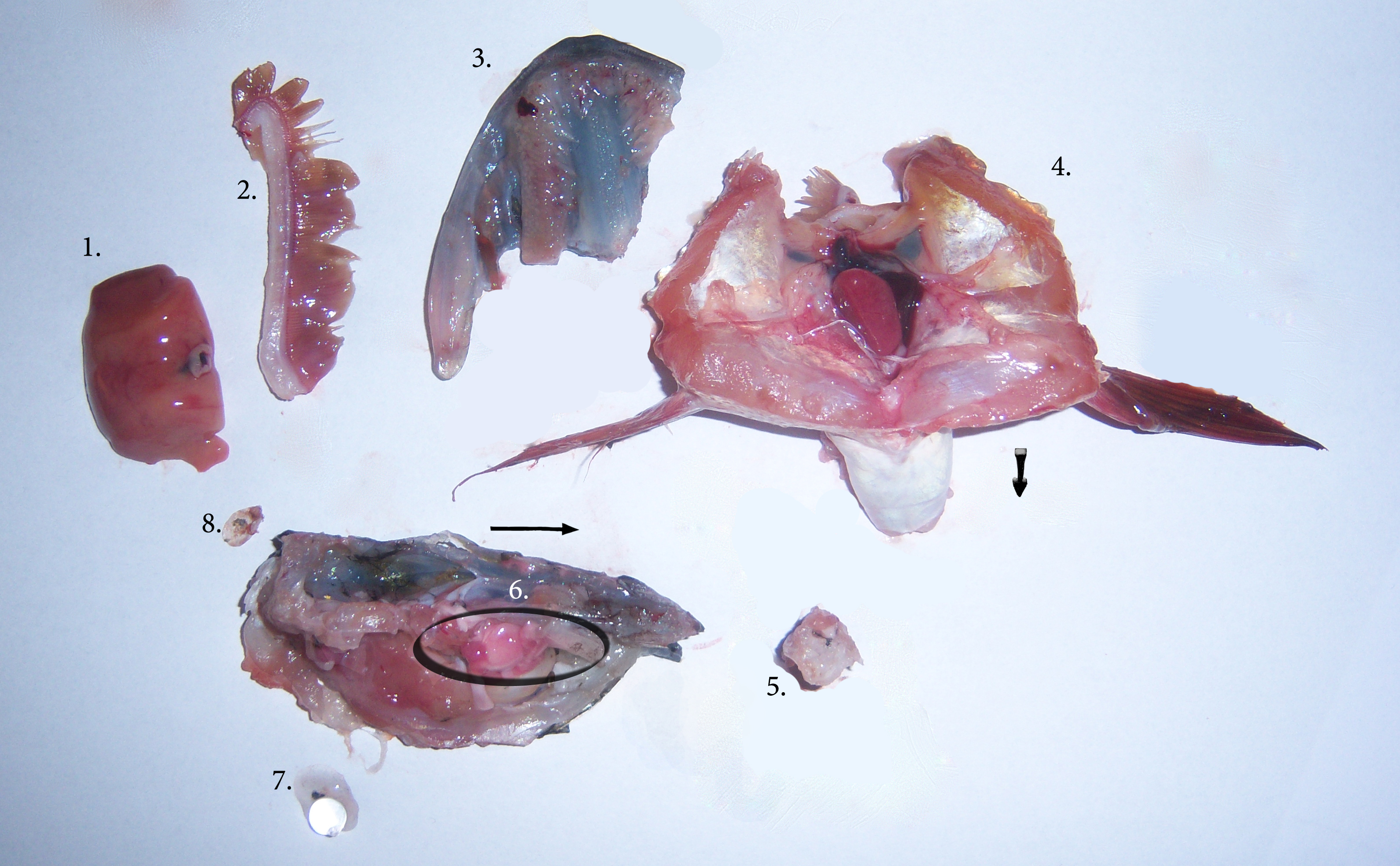
Parts of a pike including the head. 1: liver, 2: gill arch, 3: palate with sharp teeth, 4: in the middle a heart, 5: fragment of spinal cord, 6: brain, 7: spherical lens, 8: scale

Fish heads, either separated or still attached to the rest of the fish, are sometimes used in culinary dishes, or boiled for fish stock.

== Anatomy ==
The head of a fish includes the snout, from the eye to the forward most point of the upper jaw, the operculum or gill cover (absent in sharks and jawless fish), and the cheek, which extends from eye to preopercle. The operculum and preopercle may or may not have spines. In sharks and some primitive bony fish, a spiracle, a small extra gill opening, is found behind each eye.

The skull in fishes is formed from a series of only loosely connected bones. Jawless fish and sharks possess only a cartilaginous endocranium, with both the upper and lower jaws being separate elements. Bony fishes have an additional dermal bone, forming a more or less coherent skull roof in lungfish and holost fish. The lower jaw defines a chin.

== Cultural aspects ==
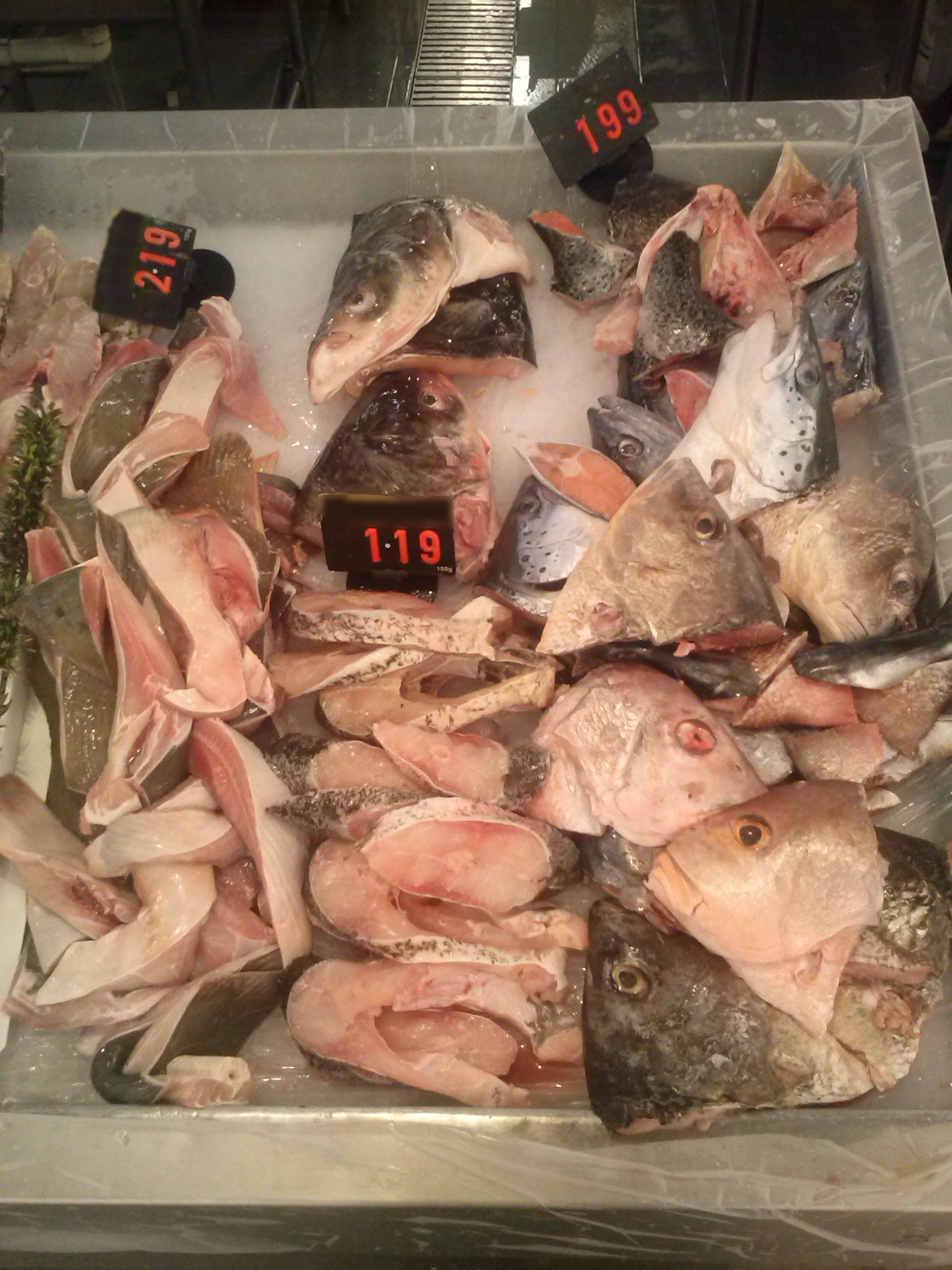
Fish heads at a market

In some Jewish communities, it is traditional to eat a fish head for Rosh Hashana (literally "head of the year").

In Chinese dining culture, the fish head is usually given to and eaten by the most senior person at the table.

Fish heads are the subject of the 1978 novelty song "Fish Heads" by the rock duo Barnes & Barnes.

There are many references to talking fish heads in various dream sequences featuring Tony Soprano in the HBO series The Sopranos.

Fish heads gained notoriety in 2009 with a Green Peace publicity stunt in which members of the activist group dumped five tons of fish heads on the door step of the French Fisheries Ministry.

== Culinary use ==
| Name | Image | Origin | Description |
|---|---|---|---|
| Caldillo de congrio | | Chile | Made from congrio Colorado (red conger), an eel species common in the Chilean Sea, by boiling together fish heads, onion, garlic, coriander, carrots and pepper. Once these are boiled, only the stock is used. Onion and garlic are fried together with chopped tomatoes. The vegetables are mixed then with the stock, liquid cream, boiled potatoes and marinated and boiled conger. |
| Chhencheda | | India | Made with crushed fish heads along with vegetables. The main ingredients are fish (generally Rohu or Tilapia) head and vegetables like eggplant, potatoes, tomatoes, zucchini (called Janhi in Oriya), onions, etc. |
| Crappit heid | | Scotland | (English: stuffed head). Can be traced to the fishing communities of the North, Hebrides and North-Eastern Scotland in the eighteenth century. In a time when money was scarce, the more expensive fillets of fish, such as cod or haddock would be sold to market but the offal and less attractive parts were retained by the fisherfolk for the pot. |
| Stargazy pie | | Cornwall | Made of baked pilchards, along with eggs and potatoes, covered with a pastry crust. Although there are a few variations with different fish being used, the unique feature of stargazy pie is fish heads (and sometimes tails) protruding through the crust, so that they appear to be gazing skyward. This allows the oils released during cooking to flow back into the pie. |
| Fish head casserole | | China | Prepared with a fish head (about 1 kg), bean curd, cayenne pepper, sesame oil, vegetable oil, garlic sprouts, shallot, ginger, soy, salt, cooking wine, white sugar and monosodium glutamate. The fish head is washed, marinated in soy sauce, and fried with cooking wine added. The head is then stewed and served garnished with garlic sprouts and sesame oil. The broth in this dish has a milky white colour. |
| Fish head curry | | Malaysia | This dish had its origins in Singapore, when a chef wanted his South Indian-style food to cater to a wider clientele, notably Chinese customers who considered fish head a specialty. The head of a red snapper is semi-stewed in a Kerala-style curry with assorted vegetables such as okra and eggplant (brinjals), usually served with rice or bread. |
| Fish head curry | | Indian | In India and Bengal where the staple is rice and fish, one very popular fish head curry is made with moog or ung beans but other vegetables can also be used. The gravy is very thick and very spicy. Rohu is most popular fish used for this dish. |
| Fish head curry | | Peranakan | Peranakans are also called Straits Chinese, who have a Chinese-Malay heritage. Today Peranakan restaurants serve variations of this dish. |
| Muri ghantoo | | Bengali | Made from rice and fish heads, usually the heads of rohu. It is not fully cooked, giving the dish a grainy texture. Used on festive occasions. |
| Tepa | | Yup'ik | Tepas, also called stinkheads, are fermented whitefish heads. A customary way of preparing them is to place fish heads and guts in a wooden barrel, cover it with burlap, and bury it in the ground for about a week. For a short while in modern times, plastic bags and buckets replaced the barrel. However this increased the risk of botulism, and the Yup'ik have reverted to fermenting fish heads directly in the ground. |
| Fish head soup with rice noodles | | Malaysia | A Malaysian breakfast made from simmering fish head and fish bones, usually with grasscarp. Traditionally, this fish stock was made by boiling and simmering deep-fried fish bones to achieve a milky white fish stock. However, as times goes by, the local vendors adjusted the preparation method and used evaporated milk instead for convenience purposes to achieve the milky white fish stock. Hence, the locals has now grow accustomed to the milk-infused fish broth flavor. |

Fish heads as food

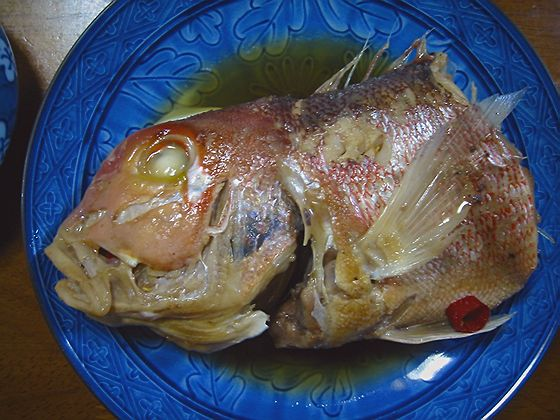
Fish head (red tilefish) Japan

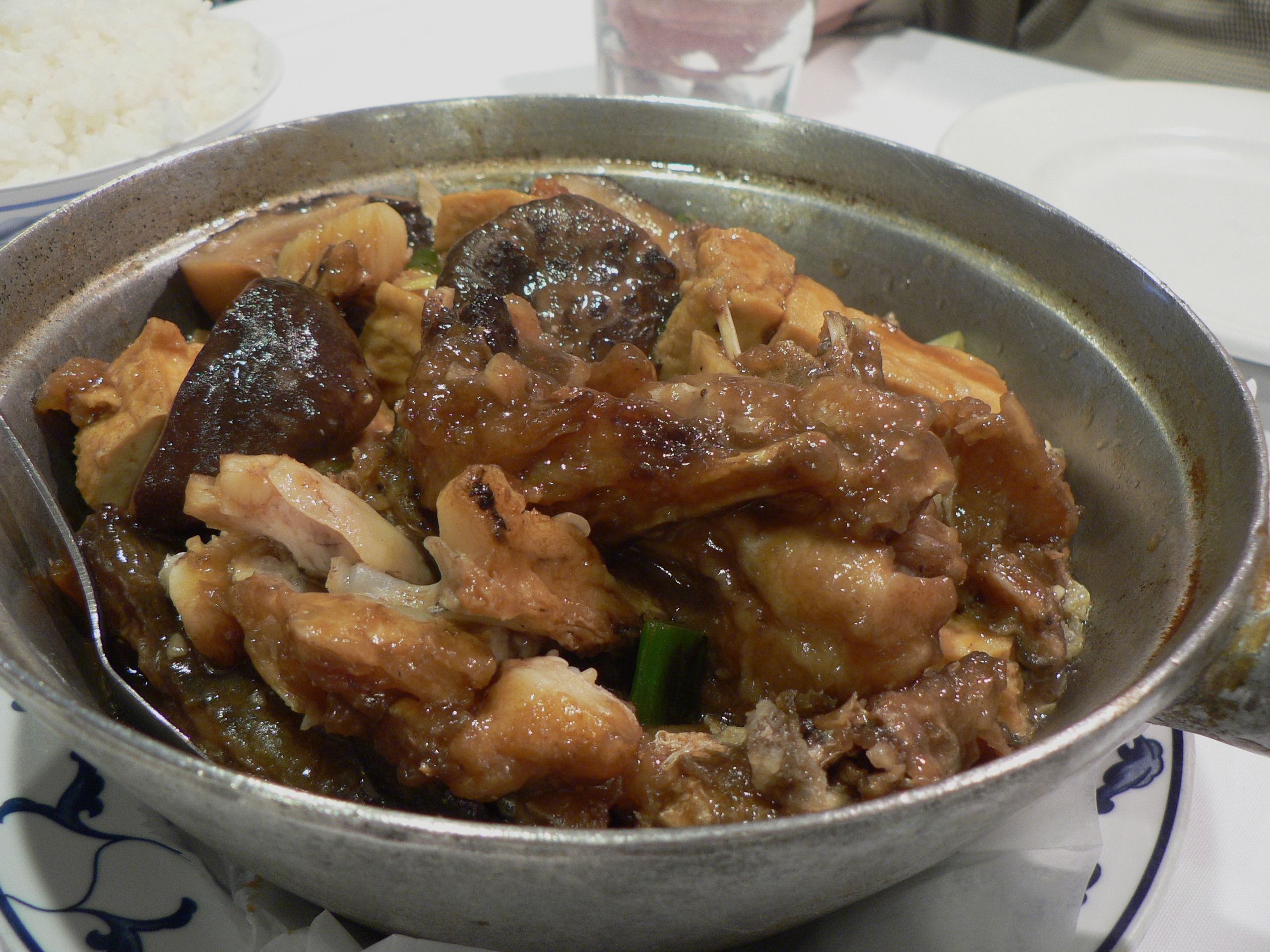
Braised fish head in pot

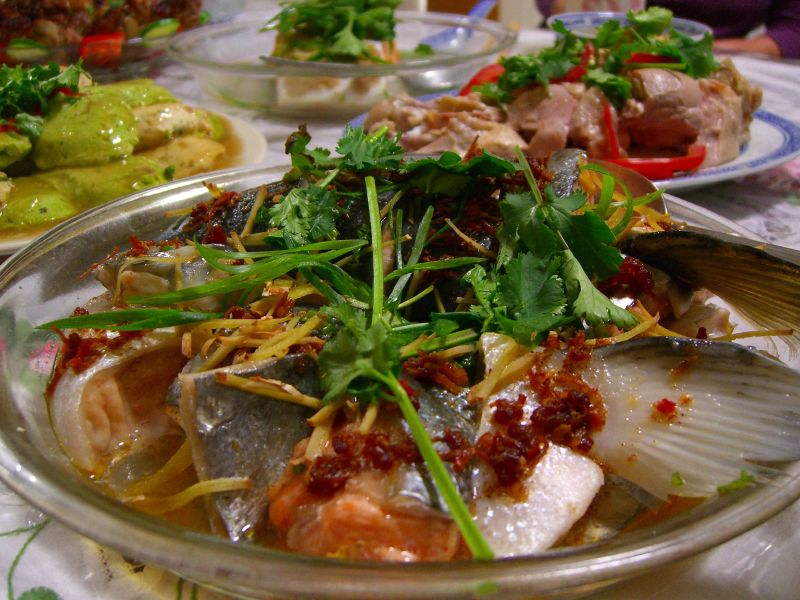
Steamed salmon head

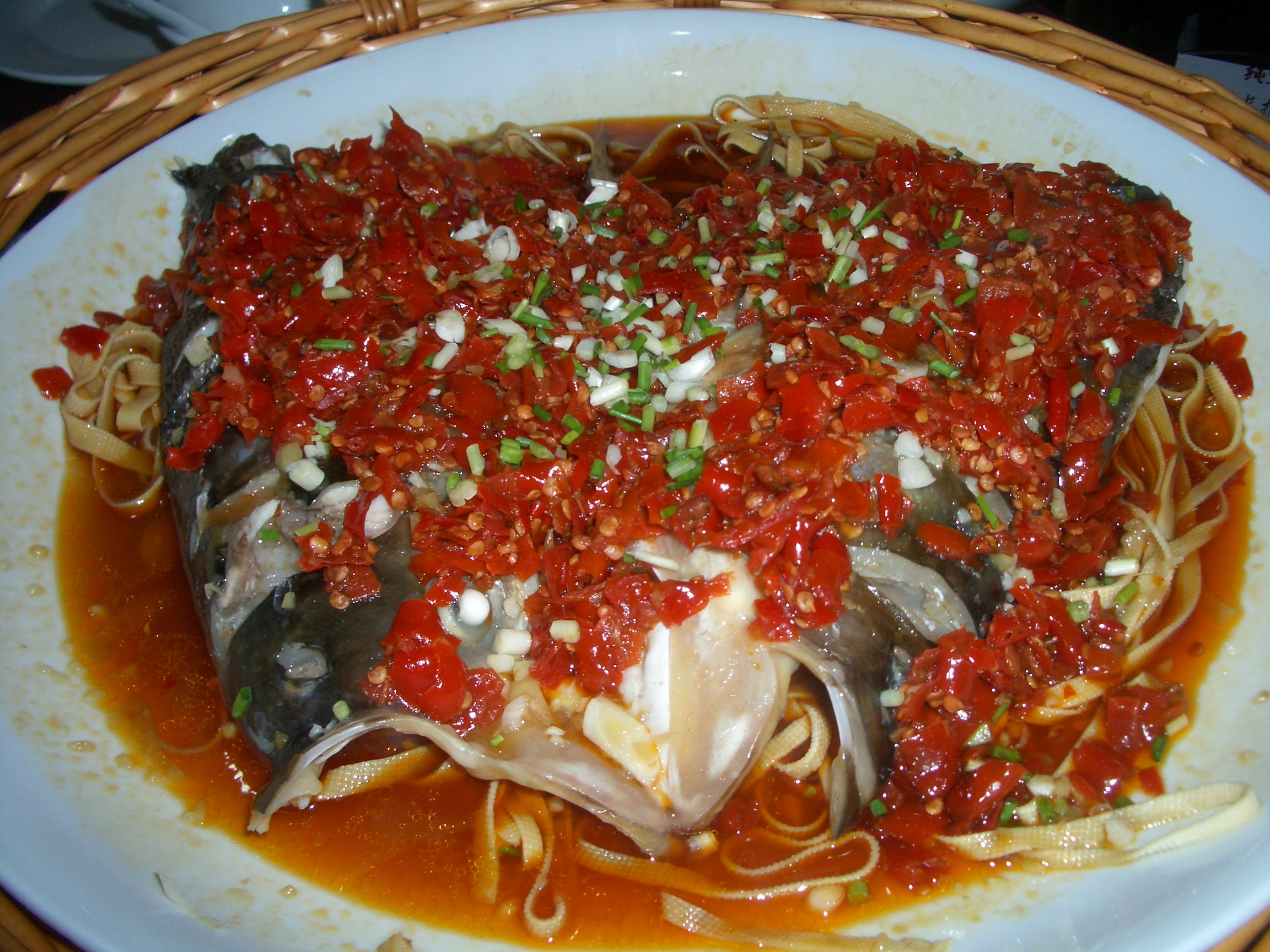
Mashed pepper fish head

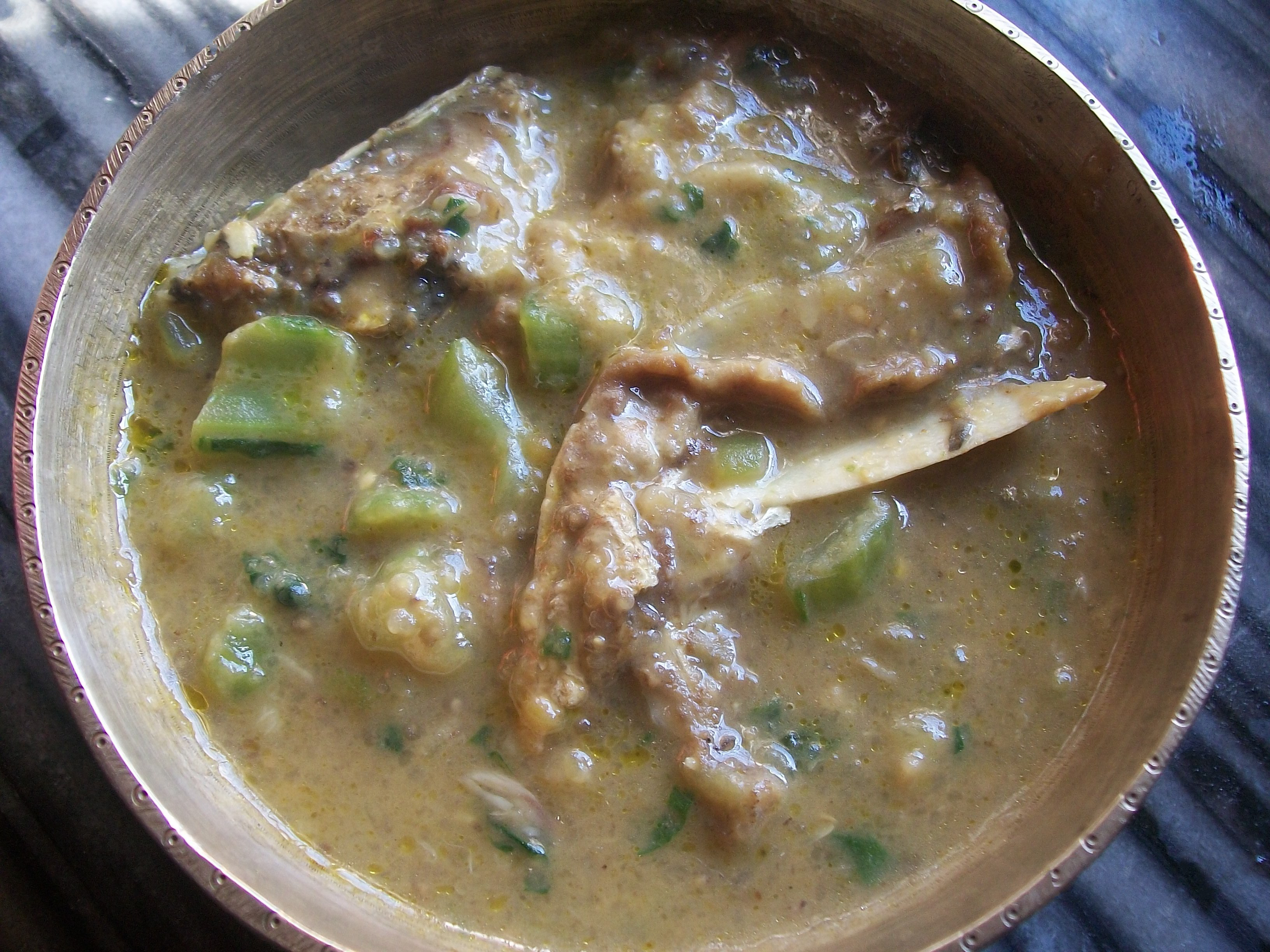
Assamese khar dish with rohu fish heads

== See also ==
- Bighead carp, prized for the meat on its head
- List of seafood dishes
