= Kedgeree =

Fish and rice-based dish

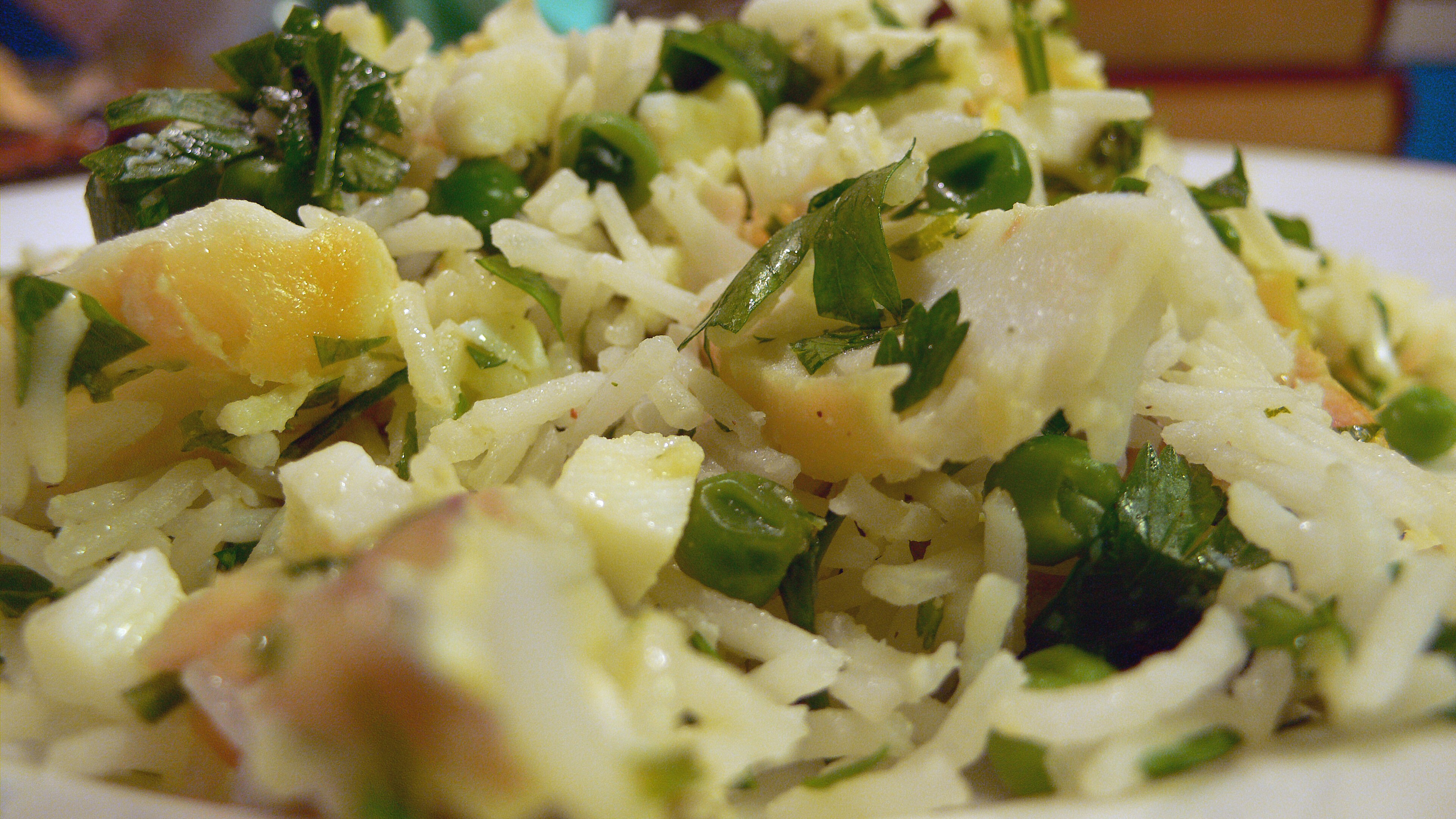
- Place of origin: India and Scotland
- Main ingredients: Rice, smoked haddock, eggs, parsley, butter or cream

Kedgeree (or occasionally kitcherie, kitchari, kidgeree, kedgaree, kitchiri, khichuri, or kaedjere) is a dish consisting of cooked, flaked fish (traditionally smoked haddock), boiled rice, parsley, hard-boiled eggs, curry powder, lemon juice, salt, butter or cream, and occasionally sultanas.

The dish can be eaten hot or cold. Other fish can be used instead of haddock such as tuna or salmon, though these are not traditional. In Scotland, kippers are often substituted for the smoked haddock.

In India, khichari is any of a large variety of legume-and-rice dishes. These dishes are made with a spice mixture designed for each recipe and either dry-toasted or fried in oil before inclusion.

== History ==
Kedgeree is thought to have originated with the Indian rice-and-bean or rice-and-lentil dish khichuṛī, traced back to 1340 or earlier. Hobson-Jobson cites ibn Battuta (c. 1340) mentioning a dish of munj (mung beans) boiled with rice called kishrī and cites a recipe for khichdi from the Ain-i-Akbari (c. 1590). In Gujarat, where khichdi remains popular, the lentil and rice dish is usually served with kadhi, a spiced yogurt dish that can be mixed with the khichdi. Khichdi is usually not prepared with fish in Gujarat, although fish is sometimes eaten with khichdi in coastal villages where seafood is plentiful. According to Hobson-Jobson, while fish is eaten with kedgeree, the use of the term for "mess of re-cooked fish ... is inaccurate". The Mughal emperor Aurangzeb (d.1707) was fond of the Alamgiri Khichdi, a variety featuring fish and boiled eggs.

It is widely believed that the dish was brought to the United Kingdom by returning British colonials who had enjoyed it in India and introduced it to the UK as a breakfast dish in Victorian times, part of the new introduced cuisine. The dish was listed as early as 1790 in the recipe book of Stephana Malcolm of Burnfoot, Dumfriesshire. The National Trust for Scotland's book The Scottish Kitchen by Christopher Trotter notes the Malcolm recipe and other old examples, expressing the belief that the dish was devised by Scottish regiments hankering for the tastes of India.

By the 19th century, kedgeree had become a sophisticated breakfast or brunch dish in England, appearing, for example, in a Saki short story, "A Bread and Butter Miss." By the late 19th century, it was served as a breakfast dish for children in upper-class Victorian households. By 1930s and 1940s in Britain, kedgeree was a popular and affordable breakfast among the working classes and in institutional settings because it could incorporate leftovers; rather than fresh fish, smoked or tinned fish was often used. Kedgeree followed a similar trend in the United States, where it was first popularized as a breakfast dish in Victorian times and would later be served at the White House during Franklin Delano Roosevelt's presidency (1933–1945).

== See also ==
- Fish curry
- Koshary, a related Egyptian dish
- List of seafood dishes
- List of rice dishes
