= Fish curry =

Fish curry may refer to:

- Nga Thongba, an Indian-origin freshwater fish curry of traditional Meitei cuisine
- Kedgeree, Indian and later British breakfast dish
- Malabar matthi curry, an Indian dish
- Fish head curry, a Singaporean dish where the head of an ikan merah (red snapper, literally "red fish") is used
- Machher jhol (also called machher ghonta), a traditional Bengali and Oriya fish curry
- Mas riha, a Maldivian fish curry
- Malu mirisata, a fish curry from Sri Lanka
- Fish amok, a Khmer fish curry
- The Fish Curry, a 2017 Indian short animated film by Abhishek Verma, winner of the National Film Award for Best Non-Feature Animation Film
