= Kue putu mayang =

Indonesian rice dish

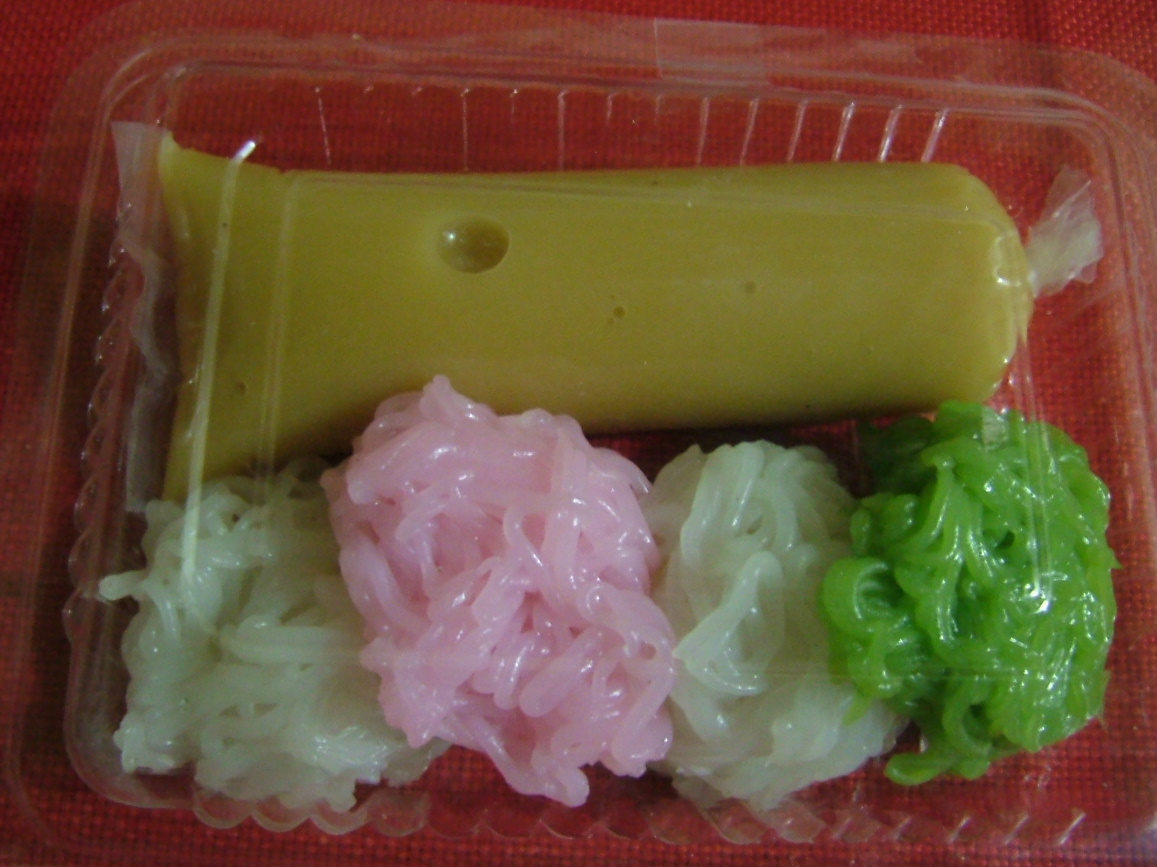
- Kue putu mayang with liquid palm sugar
- Type: String hopper, kue
- Course: Breakfast, dessert, snack
- Place of origin: Indonesia
- Region or state: Jakarta
- Main ingredients: Rice flour

Kue putu mayang is an Indonesian Betawi string hopper dish made of starch or rice flour and coconut milk, then shaped like noodles. This noodle-like dish served with kinca (liquid palm sugar) in Betawi and Javanese cuisine, or with chutney or curry in Indian Indonesian cuisine.

== See also ==
- Cuisine of Indonesia
- Idiyappam
- Kue putu
- Kue putu mangkok
- Kue klepon
