= Fish head curry =

Indonesian, Malaysian and Singaporean curry dish

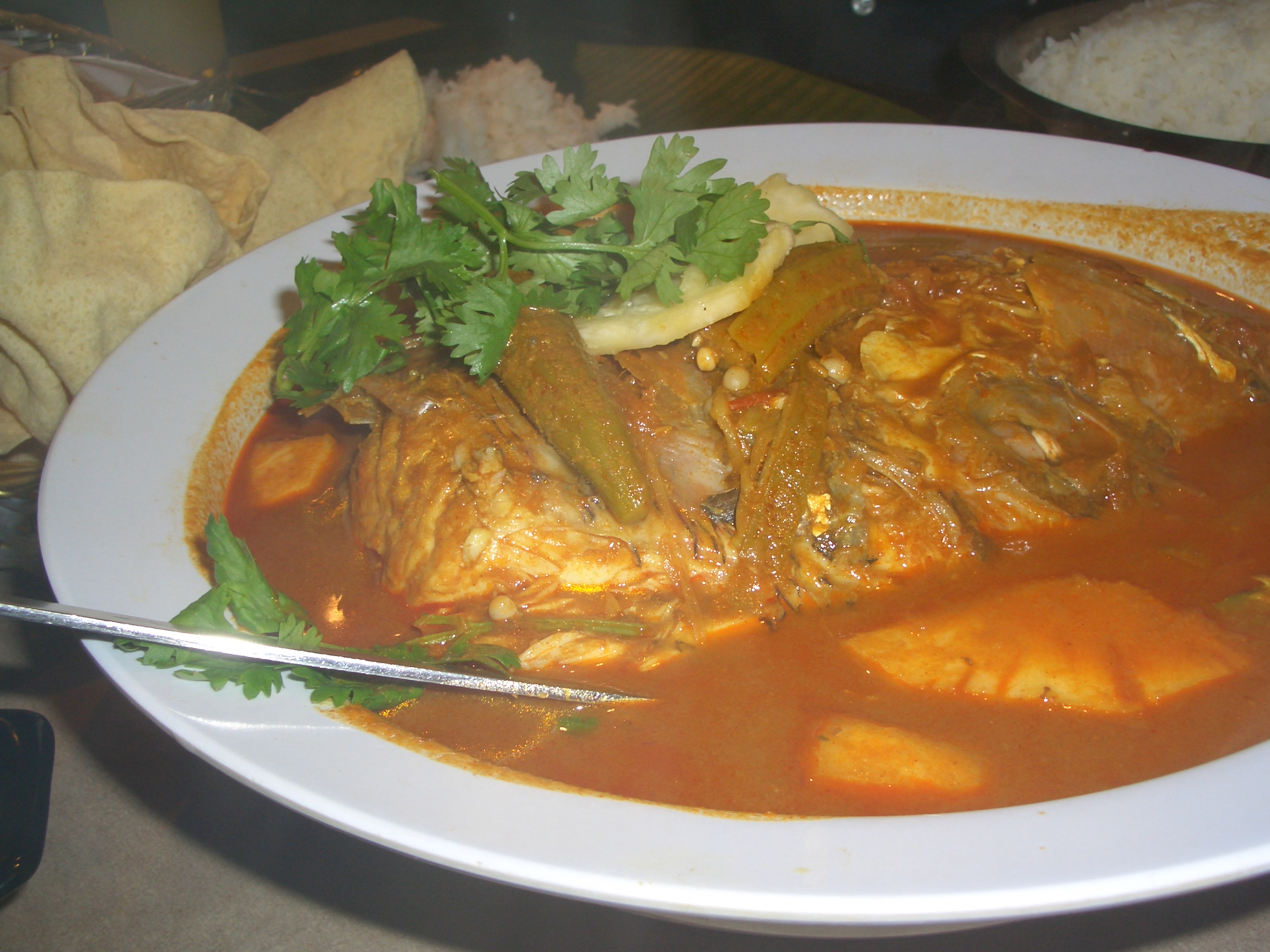
- Indian version of fish head curry
- Alternative names: Kari kepala ikan (Malay)
- Type: Curry
- Course: Main course
- Place of origin: Singapore
- Region or state: Nationwide in Malaysia and Singapore
- Created by: (Indian origin)
- Serving temperature: Hot or warm
- Main ingredients: Red snapper fish head, vegetables (okra, eggplant, Long bean)
- Variations: Fish amok, Fish head casserole, Ho mok pla, mok pa

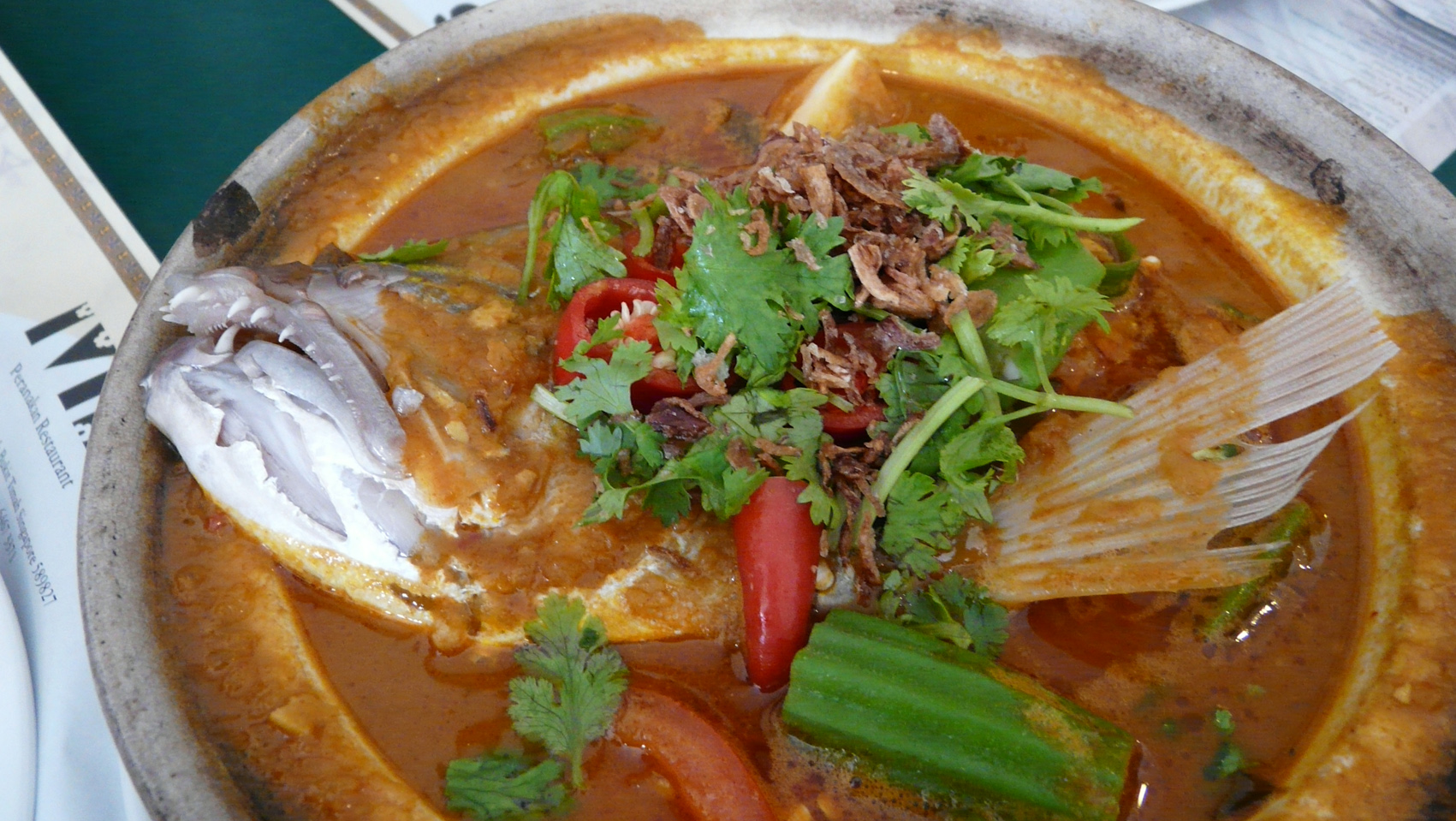
Peranakan fish head curry

Fish head curry (Malay: kari kepala ikan) is a dish in Malaysian and Singaporean cuisines with mixed Indian and Chinese origins. The head of a red snapper is stewed in a Kerala-style curry with assorted vegetables such as okra and eggplants. It is usually served with either rice or bread, or as a shared dish.

== Description ==
It is believed that fish head curry was invented when chef M.J. Gomez from Kerala, India adopted the dish to bring South Indian cuisine to diners in Singapore. Although fish head was not widely served in India, Chinese customers considered it to be a special delicacy, so M.J. had the idea of cooking the fish in curry instead. The dish was first sold in 1949, at the restaurant opened by Gomez.

Today, Indian, Malay, Chinese, and Peranakan restaurants all serve variations of this dish. Fish head curry has become a popular dish among Singaporeans and tourists alike. Costing between $10 and $20, it is generally not considered cheap hawker fare. It typically comes served in a clay pot, and is often sold at hawker centers and neighbourhood food stalls.

== Preparation ==
Tamarind (asam) juice is frequently added to the gravy to give the dish a sweet-sour flavor (see asam fish). This variety of fish head curry also has a thinner, orange gravy.

Coconut milk can be added to this dish.

== See also ==
- Malay cuisine
- Minangkabau cuisine
- Peranakan cuisine
- Singaporean cuisine
- Malabar matthi curry
- Fish head casserole
- Fish amok
- Fish stew
- Fish curry (disambiguation)
