= Fish head casserole =

Chinese cuisine

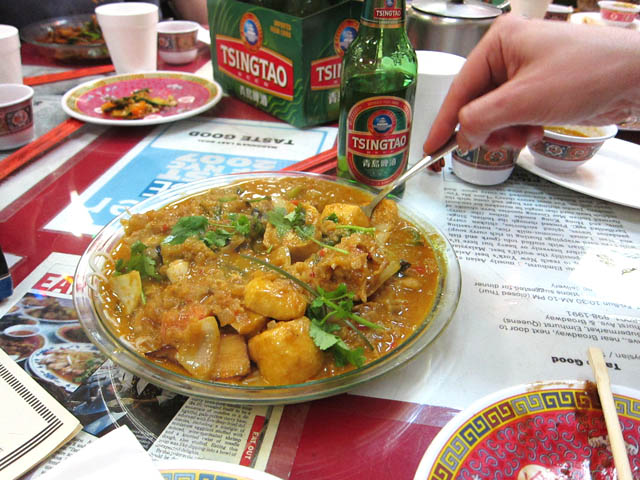
- Course: Main course
- Place of origin: China
- Main ingredients: Fish heads

Fish head casserole (Chinese: 砂鍋魚頭; pinyin: shā guō yú tóu) is a seafood dish from Jiangsu province in China. It is named for its main ingredient, fish heads, which are cooked in a casserole.

Fish head casserole was invented in the Tian Mu Lake area.

== See also ==
- Cuisine of China
- List of casserole dishes
