= Idiyappam =

Rice noodle dish

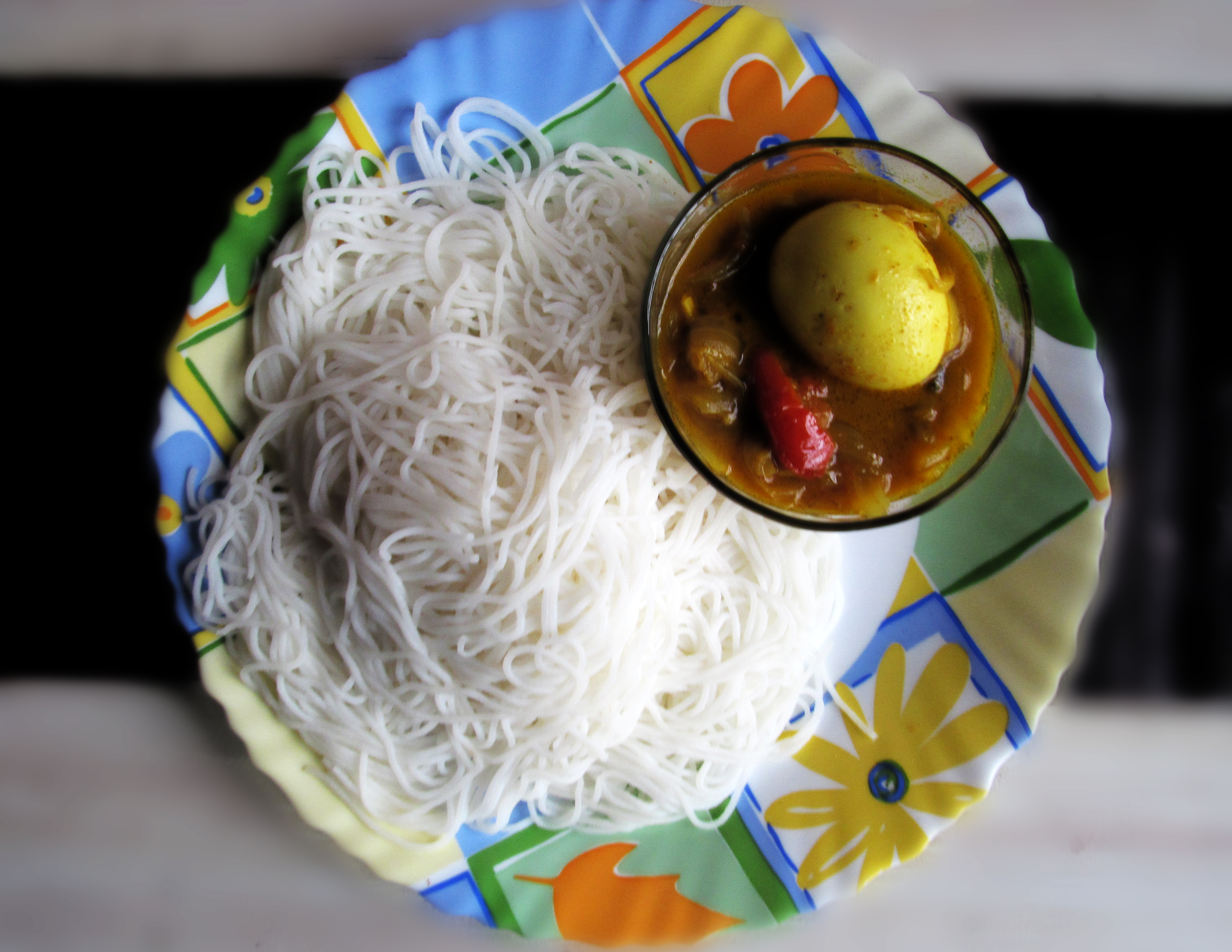
- Idiyappam served with curry
- Alternative names: noolappam, indiapa, noolputtu, santhagai, ottu shavige, putu mayam, putu mayang, chomai, suvaijappam, sheveo
- Type: Breakfast
- Place of origin: India
- Region or state: Tamilakam
- Associated cuisine: Tamil cuisine Kerala cuisine
- Main ingredients: Rice flour

Idiyappam, also known as indiappa, noolappam, noolputtu, sheveo, santhagai, or ottu shavige, is a string hopper dish originating from southern India Tamilakam. It consists of rice flour pressed into noodles, laid into a flat disc-like shape and steamed. The dish also spread to Southeast Asia.

== History ==
According to food historian K. T. Achaya, idiyappam, appam, idli, dosa and vada were known during Tamilakam the 1st century AD, as per references in the Sangam literature. The Lokopakara (1025 AD) cookbook in Kannada also mentions a method of making shavige and the mold-presser used for it.

== Distribution ==
Idiyappam is a culinary speciality throughout the Indian states of Tamil Nadu, Kerala, Karnataka and the country of Sri Lanka. The name idiyappam derives from Malayalam. Malayalam word 'Idi' means press and appam forms the name Idiyappam. The dish is also, frequently, called as nool appam or nool puttu, originating from the Tamil word nool, meaning string or thread. In Karnataka, it is known as Ottu Shavige in Kannada and it is also termed semige or semé da addae in Tulu in Mangalore and Udupi. In Maharashtra it is known as Shirvale. In Karnataka distinction between Ottu Shavige (unbroken shavige) and shavige is made based on different recipes. In Mangalore and Udupi it is eaten with Tuluva chicken or fish curry, and a coconut milk dish called rasayana. It is also a common breakfast item in Malaysia, Singapore (especially among the Peranakan Chinese), and night snack in Indonesia where it is called putu mayam, typically served with brown palm sugar and grated coconut.

== Preparation ==
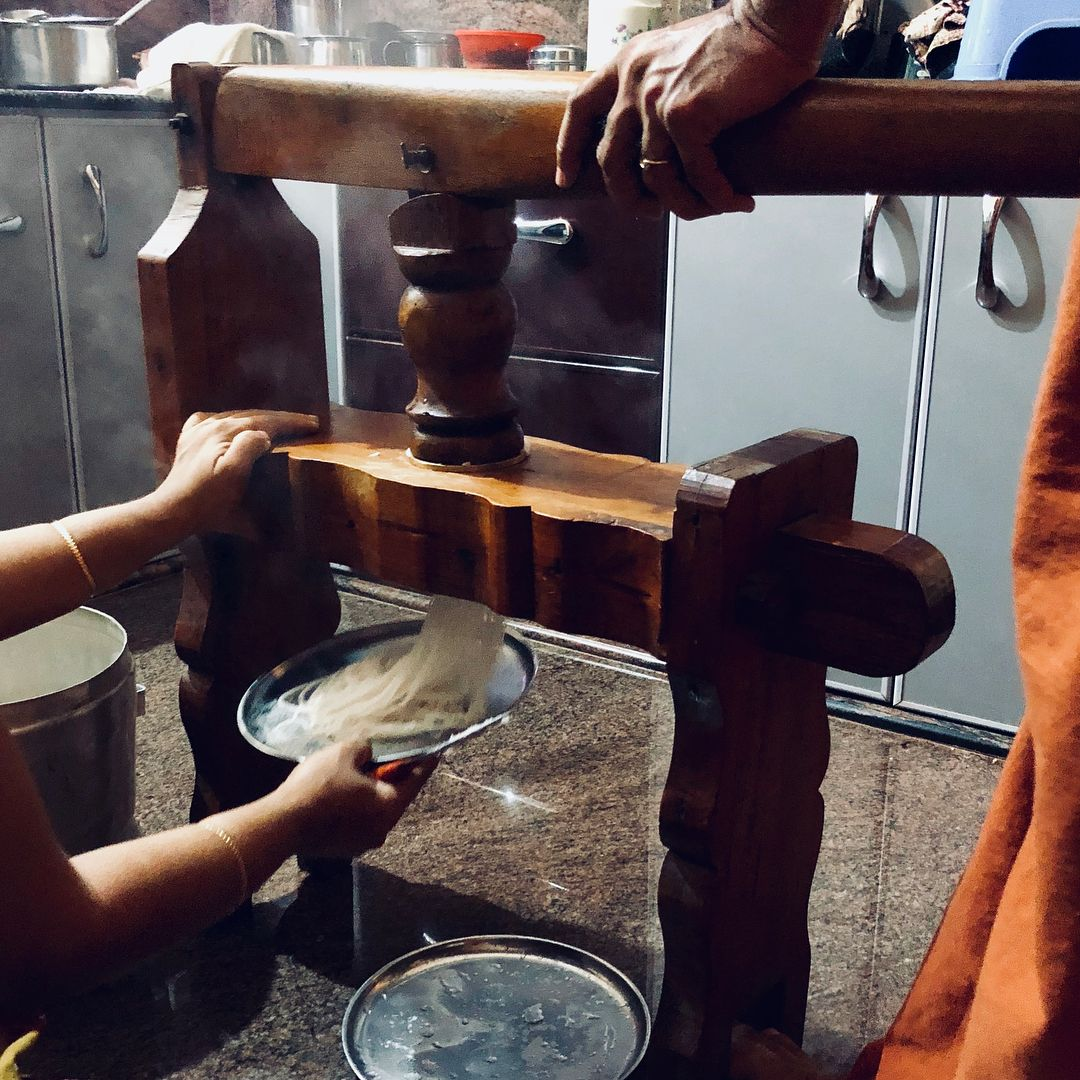
Ottu Shavige being prepared in a traditional wooden press, Karnataka

It is made of rice flour, salt, and water. In most parts of Kerala and Tamil Nadu Idiyappam is steamed after making seva, while in the Kongu region of Tamil Nadu, the steamed rice flour ball is pressed to make Idiyappam, a reverse process more similar to Ottu Shavige in neighbouring Karnataka. In Tamil Nadu, distinction between Idiyappam and Santhagai is made based on preparation technique. Steamed rice flour balls are pressed to make santhagai, in contrast to Idiyappam, where pressed noodles are steamed. It is generally served as the main course at breakfast or dinner together with a curry (potato, egg, fish, or meat curry or rasam) and coconut chutney. It is served with coconut milk and sugar in the Malabar region of Kerala. It is not usually served at lunch. In Kerala and Sri Lanka, it is mostly eaten with spicy curries or rasam. Using wheat flour in its preparation gives it a brownish hue.

Putu mayam is made by mixing rice flour or idiyappam flour with water or coconut milk, and pressing the dough through a sieve to make vermicelli-like noodles. Among Singapore's Peranakan, small wooden, aluminium or brass presses used to make homemade rice vermicelli can make do as to press putu. These noodles are steamed, usually with the addition of juice from the fragrant screwpine leaf juice as flavouring. The noodles are served with grated coconut and jaggery, or gur (date palm sugar). In some areas, gula melaka (coconut palm sugar) is the favourite sweetener. Putu piring is a version of putu mayam in which the rice flour dough is used to form a small cake around a filling of coconut and gur or jaggery.

== Serving ==
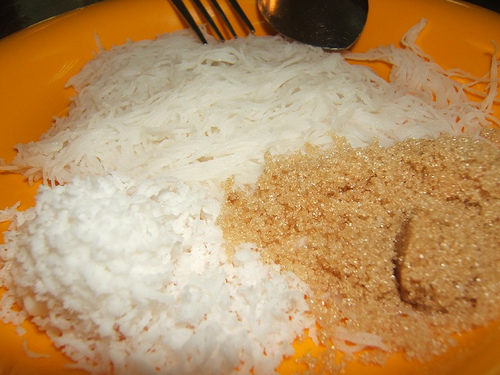
Putu mayam

This dish may be eaten for breakfast with a vegetable stew or avial, or a fish curry, etc. The same liking for serving the slightly sweet putu mayam, putu piring, or cendol with savory dishes also occurs in Malaysia and Singapore. Idiyappam is typical of Kerala, Sri Lanka and Karnataka, as well as Tamil Nadu. A very finely ground, commercial idiyappam flour is sold as a sort of "instant" way to make all of these dishes.

In Malaysia and Singapore, putu mayam and its relatives are commonly sold as street food from market stalls or carts, as well as being made at home, and are usually served cold. In Indonesia, putu mayam is called putu mayang and is served with palm sugar mixed with coconut milk.

== Gallery ==
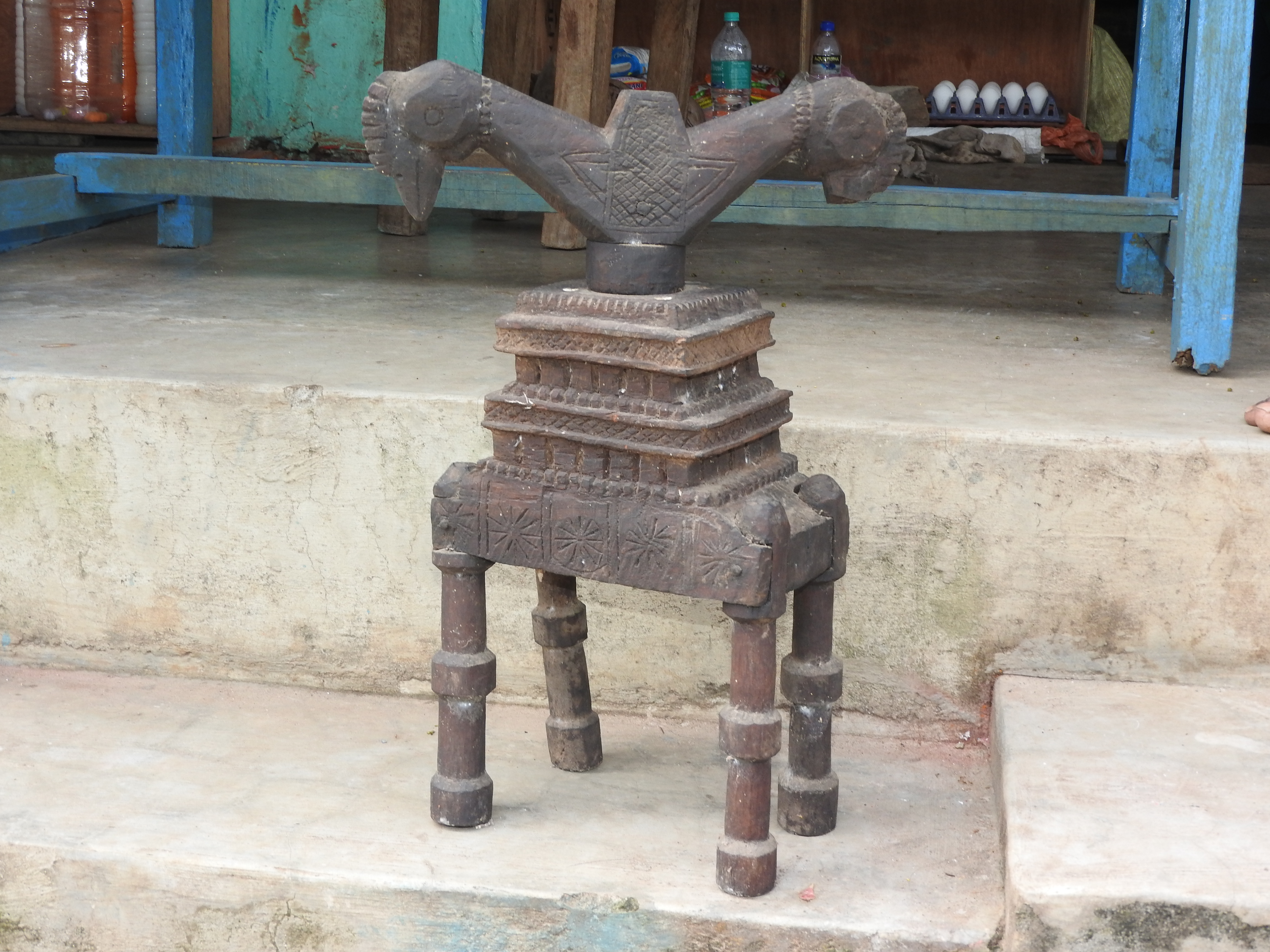
Traditional wooden Sevai/Idiyappam maker, Tamil Nadu

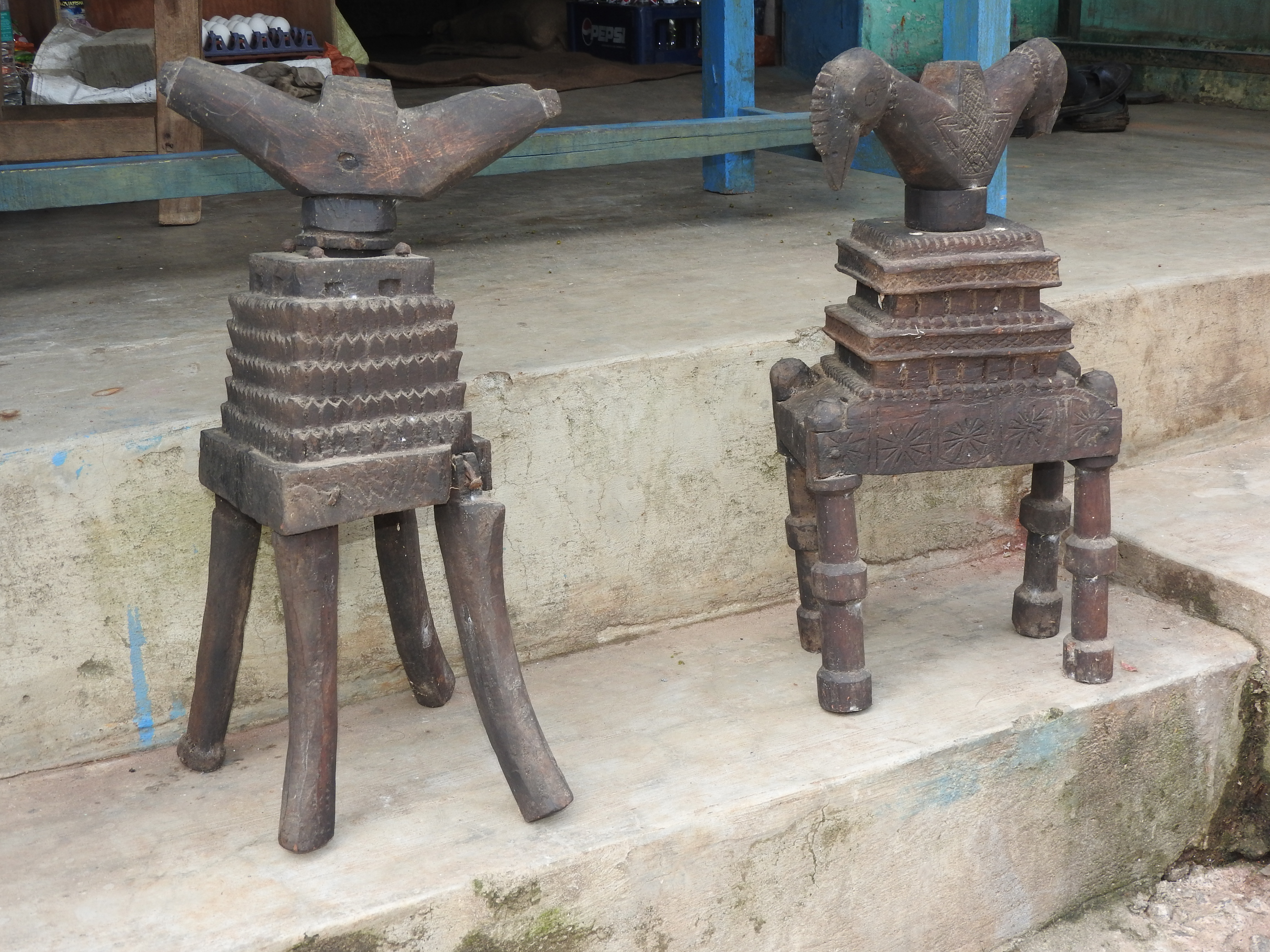
Wooden Sevai/Idiyappam maker, Tamil Nadu

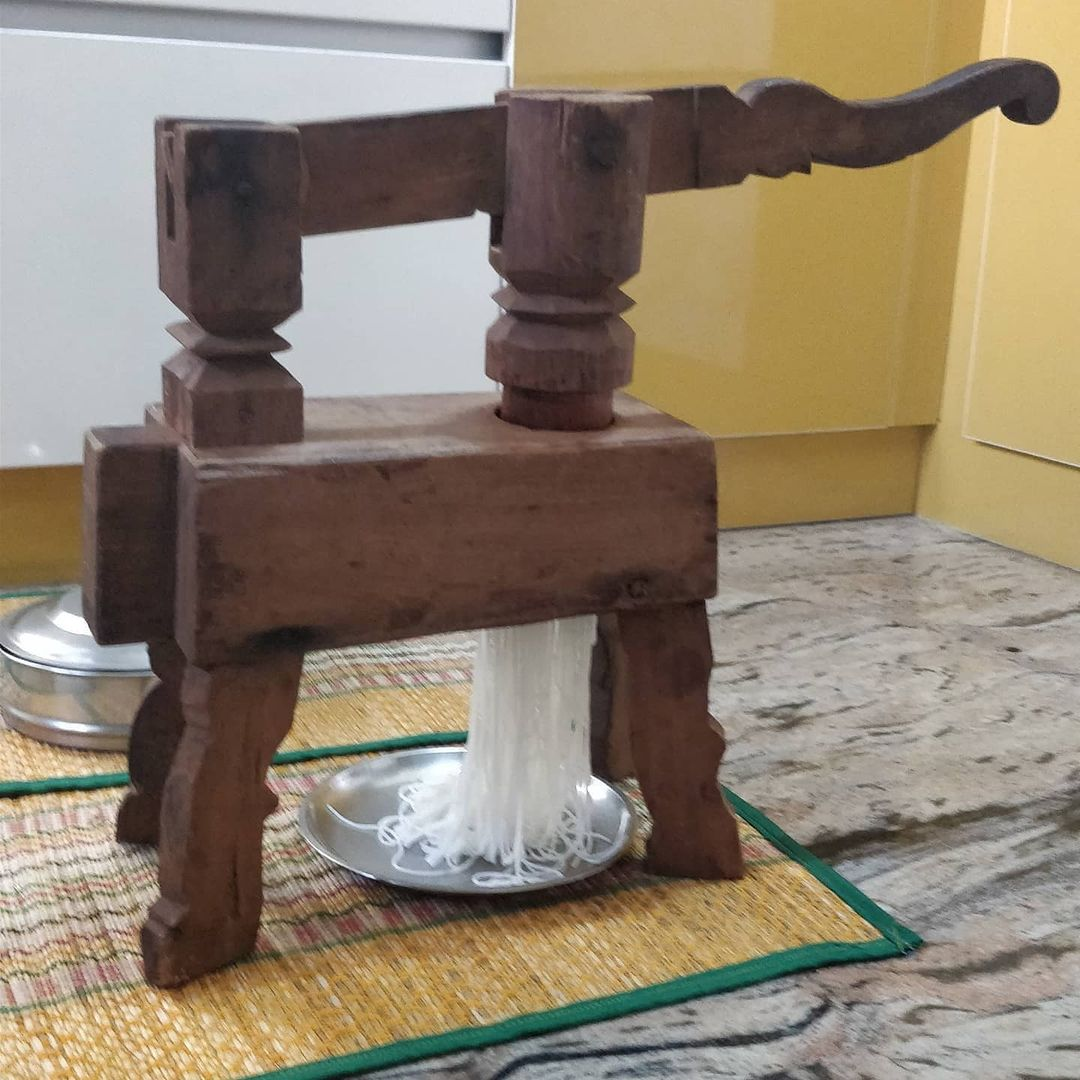
Ottu Shavige making in traditional wood presser, Karnataka.

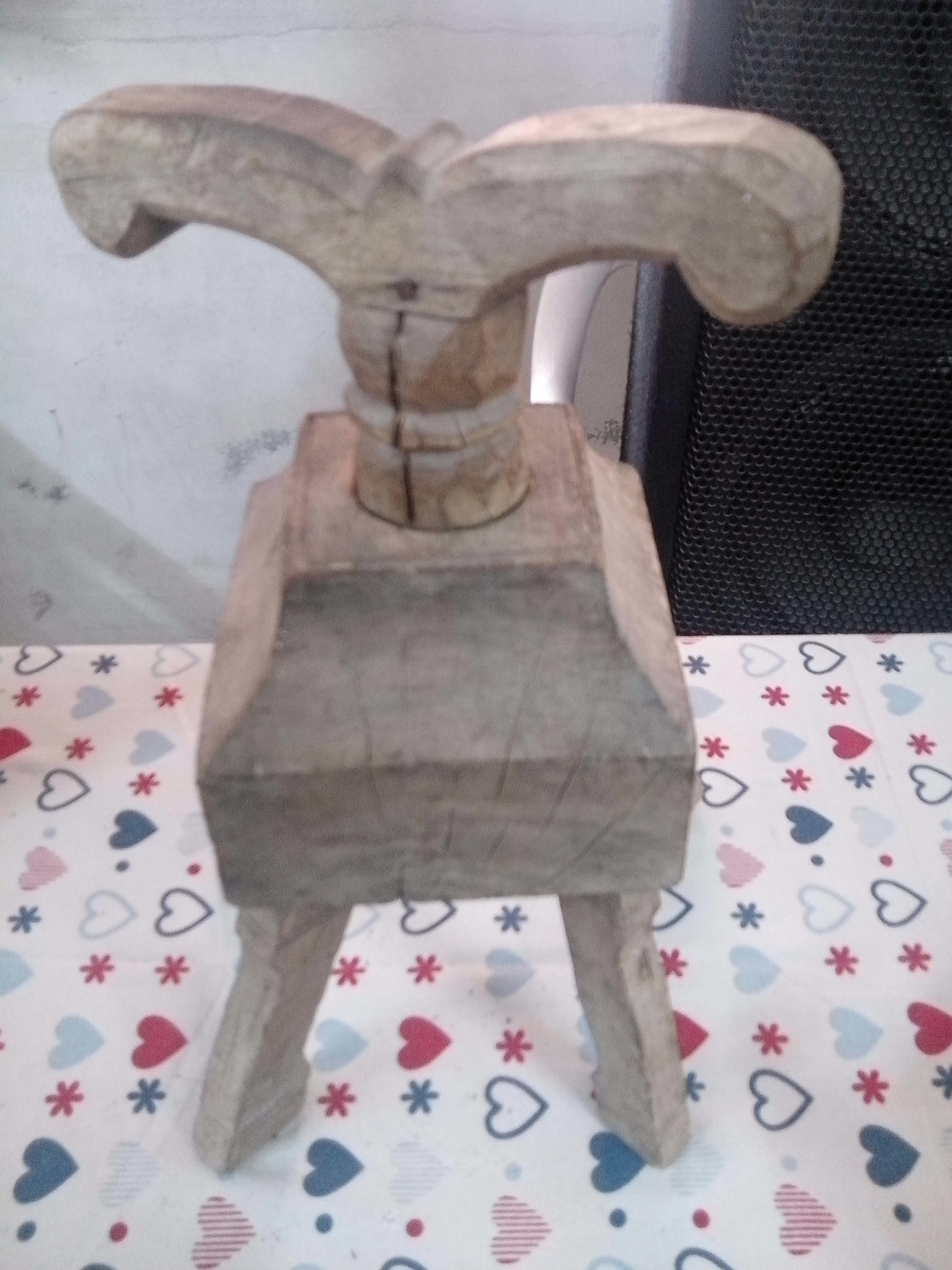
Wooden Idiyappam maker, Kerala or Tamil Nadu.

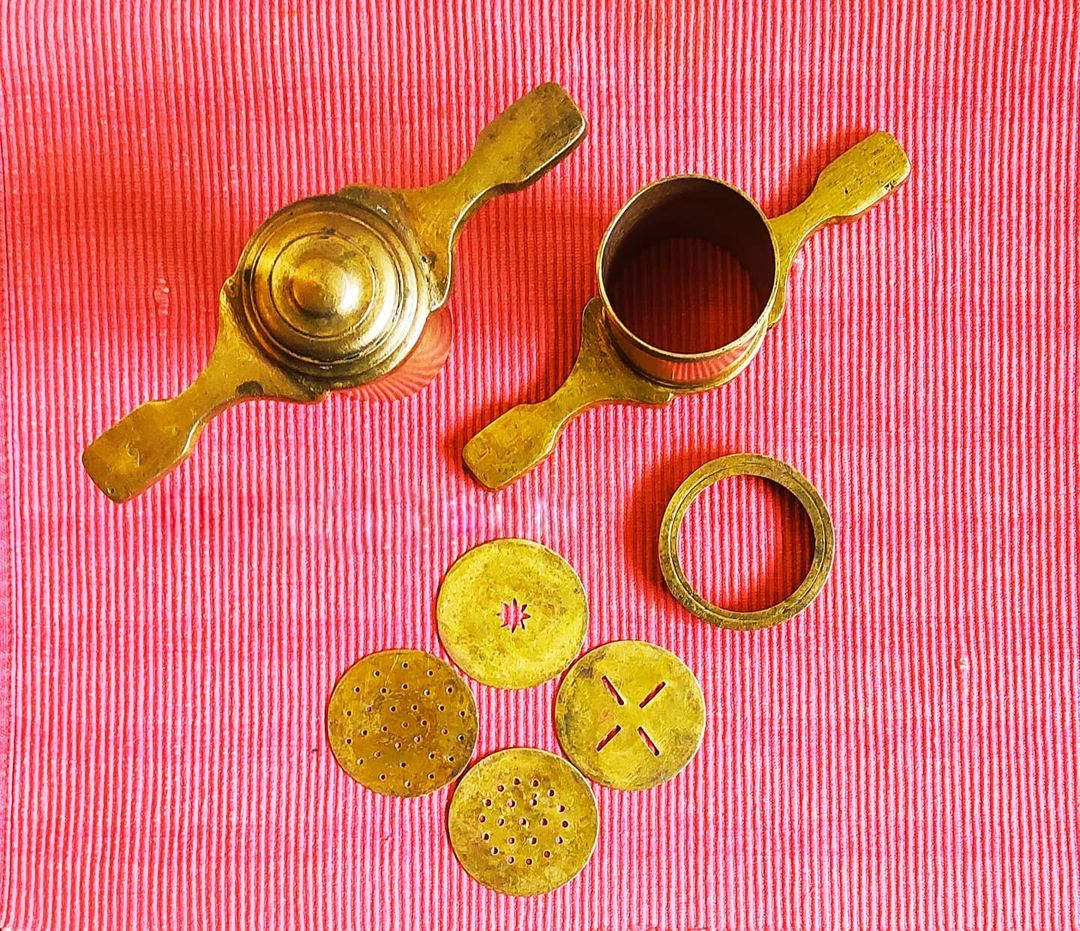
Traditional brass presser used for sevai/ idiyappam and various other snacks.

Idiyappam made in modern presser with spinner on top, Tamil Nadu

== See also ==
- Kueh tutu
- Cuisine of Singapore
- Malaysian cuisine
- Indian cuisine
- Indonesian cuisine
- List of steamed foods
- Aush
- Rice noodles
- Rice vermicelli
- Khanom chin
