= Malaysian cuisine =

Culinary traditions of Malaysia

Malaysian cuisine (Malay: Masakan Malaysia; Jawi: ماسقن مليسيا) consists of cooking traditions and practices found in Malaysia, and reflects the multi-ethnic makeup of its population. The vast majority of Malaysia's population can roughly be divided among three major ethnic groups: Malays, Chinese and Indians. The remainder consists of the indigenous peoples of Sabah and Sarawak in East Malaysia, the Orang Asli of Peninsular Malaysia, the Peranakan and Eurasian creole communities, as well as a significant number of foreign workers and expatriates.

As a result of historical migrations, colonisation by foreign powers, and its geographical position within its wider home region, Malaysia's culinary style in the present day is primarily a melange of traditions from its Malay, Chinese, Indian, Indonesian, Thai, Filipino and indigenous Bornean and Orang Asli, with light to heavy influences from Arab, Thai, Portuguese, Dutch and British cuisines, among others.

Because Peninsular Malaysia shares a common history with Singapore, it is common to find versions of the same dish across both sides of the border regardless of the place of origin, such as laksa and chicken rice. The same thing can be said with Malaysian Borneo and Brunei, such as ambuyat. Also because of their proximity, historic migration and close ethnic and cultural kinship, Malaysia shares culinary ties with Indonesia, Thailand and the Philippines, as these nations share dishes such as satay and rendang.

Because the vast majority of Chinese Malaysians are descendants of immigrants from southern China, Malaysian Chinese cuisine is predominantly based on dishes with roots from Fujian, Teochew, Cantonese, Hakka and Hainanese cuisines. However, although the vast majority of Indian Malaysians are descendants of immigrants from southern India, Malaysian Indian cuisine has a mixture of north-south Indian and Sri Lankan diversity that can be differentiated by drier or wetter curry dish preparation.

== History ==
=== Origins ===
Malaysian cuisine has developed over the region's history. Although the modern state of Malaysia did not exist until 1963, the cuisine can claim traceable roots as far back as the 1400s, during the time of the Malacca Sultanate. Malaysian cuisine is a mixture of various food cultures from around the Malay archipelago, such as India, China, the Middle East, and several European countries. This diverse culinary culture stems from Malaysia's diverse culture and colonial past. The cuisine was developed as a melange between local and foreign. In the 15th century, the region now known as Malaysia became an important passageway for maritime trade. Passing through Malaysia were Arab traders who brought spices from the Middle East, as well as Portuguese, Dutch, and English colonists and traders who introduced food staples such as peanuts, pineapples, avocado, tomatoes, squash and pumpkin. During the 19th century in the period of British colonial rule, many Indian and Chinese laborers were brought to Malaysia, contributing to the diversity of tastes in Malaysian cuisine.

=== Cultural and regional influences ===
Being a multicultural country, Malaysians have over the years adopted each other's dishes to suit the taste buds of their own culture. For instance, Malaysians of Chinese descent have adapted the Indian curry, and made it more dilute and less spicy to suit their taste. Chinese noodles have been crossed with Indian and Malay tastes and thus Malay fried noodles and Indian fried noodles were born. Malaysians have also adapted famous dishes from neighbouring countries, or those with strong cultural and religious ties, and in the absence of an established community from said countries have made it completely their own, a notable example being tom yam, one of Thailand's most well-known dishes

After migrating south of the border, Thai tom yam adopts the visual characteristics of a Malaysian Assam gravy, with a flavor profile that is sweet, sour, and spicy. It is thickened with pounded chili paste, which also gives it a vivid orange-red color. Tamarind is often used instead of lime juice as the souring agent, and dried chilies, rather than fresh ones, are used to provide a fiery kick. Malay-style tom yam soup tends to be heavily seafood-based, whereas in Chinese-style eateries, the broth's spiciness is toned down and it is usually served as a base for noodle soup.

Across the sea from Peninsular Malaysia, on Borneo island, lie the states of Sabah and Sarawak. Traditional lifestyles and limited roads still predominate outside of the major cities, especially in Sarawak, where rivers are the only major highways for much of the inland population. The jungles of Borneo are teeming with wild plants, fungi, and fruits, and its sweeping coastlines and many large rivers provide an abundance of seafood and freshwater fish fit for the dinner table. A rich variety of traditional food has been developed by Borneo's many tribes and indigenous groups over the centuries; much of it is healthy food, consisting of foraged (now increasingly cultivated due to modernisation) and fermented foods. Because much of the region was once under the Brunei Sultanate's thalassocracy, the Bruneian Malay people have left a lasting culinary influence, particularly on the cookery of the coastal Muslim communities of East Malaysia. According to the source paper written in 2006, the Malaysian food industrial sector accounted for about 14% of the total manufacturing energy consumption.

Historically speaking, fresh produce is often scarce for hunter-gatherer nomadic tribes around the world, thus it is usually preserved out of necessity for important events and festivals. The tribal peoples of Sabah and Sarawak are no different; most of them have developed techniques for curing, fermenting or preserving their supplies of fresh meat, fruit and vegetables. For example, during festive occasions the Murut people of Sabah would serve tamba (jeruk in the Malay language) made from fresh raw wild boar or river fish, which is stuffed in bamboo tubes along with rice and salt and left to ferment for a few weeks, a technique which is also practised by the Lun Bawang people across the border in Sarawak. Fermented products are also frequently used as a cooking ingredient besides eaten on their own. Dayak households in Sarawak may saute their version of fermented meat with garlic and tapioca leaves (either fresh or pickled), and fermented tempoyak is a popular cooking seasoning.

The production and consumption of traditional liquor play an important cultural role for the non-Muslim peoples of East Malaysia. Alcoholic drinks made from rice is the most common form, as well as the widely available. In Sabah, the Penampang Kadazan lihing is perhaps the most well known. Yet due to the historical lack of a standardised Kadazandusun language used and understood statewide, ethnic groups from other districts in Sabah have very different names for similar fermented rice-based drinks: hiing (certain Dusun languages), kinomol, segantang, kinarung, kinopi, linahas, and even tapai. To add to the confusion, tapai proper as understood by most Peninsular Malaysians is a fermented sweet and sour rice paste served as a snack or dessert, although further fermentation of the tapai to produce alcoholic drinks is possible. The preferred party drink of the Murut, made from the tuber of the cassava or tapioca plant, is also called tapai. The Iban of Sarawak call their rice wine tuak, which must not be confused with Sabahan talak, which is a hard liquor made from rice. To the native peoples of Sarawak, tuak may also refer to any alcoholic drink made from fermenting any carbohydrate-rich substance besides rice.

== Staples ==
=== Rice ===
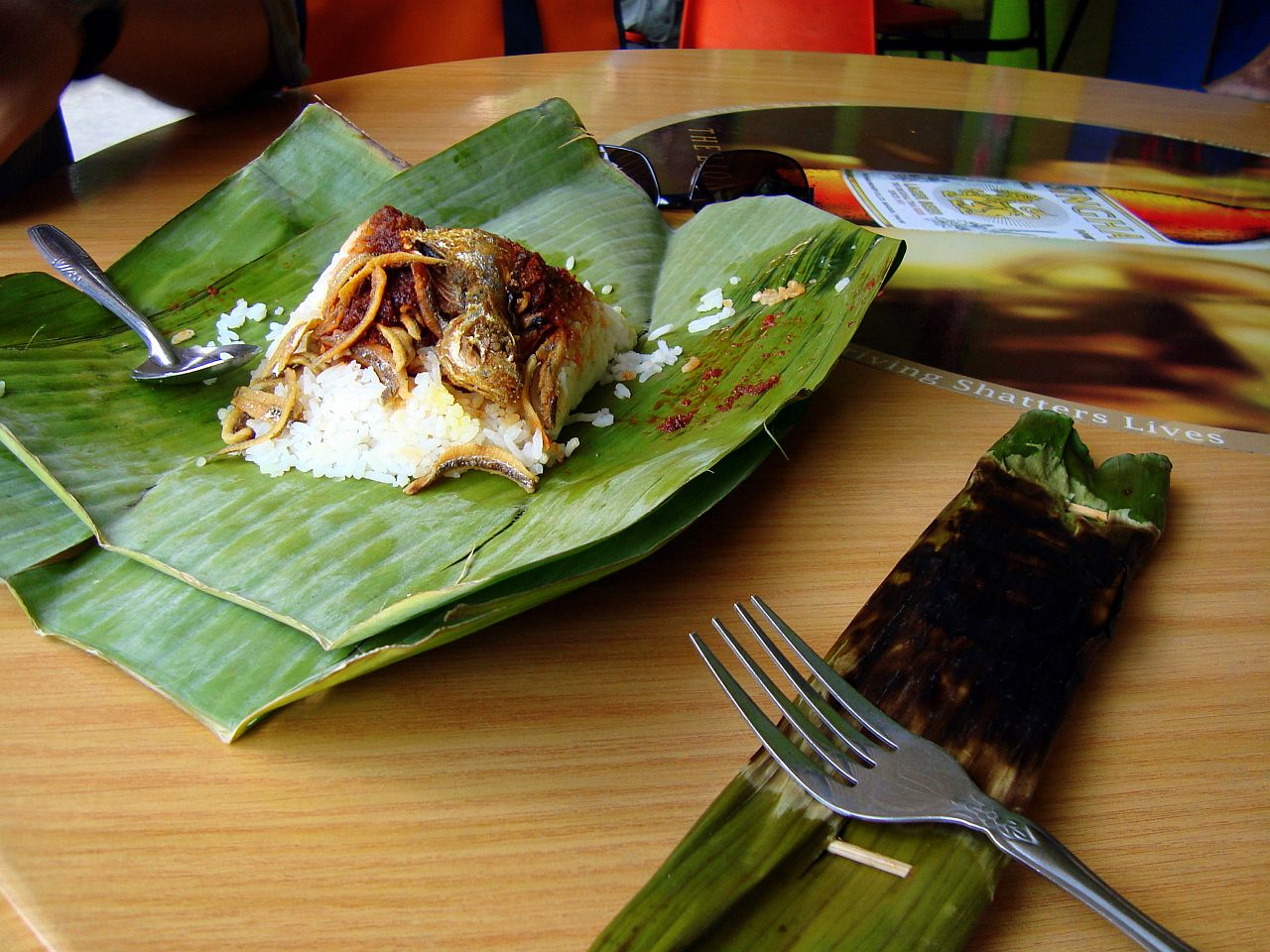
A Malaysian nasi lemak traditionally wrapped in banana leaves

Rice (Malay: nasi) is the most important staple food in Malaysia. According to Indonesian-born food and cookery writer Sri Owen, there is some evidence for rice cultivation found in the state of Sarawak in Malaysian Borneo dated 2300 BC, and about 900 years of history for the state of Kelantan in West Malaysia. Today Malaysia produces about seventy percent of the amount of rice it needs to support itself and the rest is imported. This is a matter of policy as the government believes that national resources can be used more profitably instead of attempting to achieve self-sufficiency with rice production; the prevalent attitude is that revenue generated from its industries enables the country to import up to half the rice it needs. Nevertheless, the government is fully committed and involved in planning, allocating resources and managing subsidies for the rice farming industry. The state of Kedah is considered the "rice bowl" (Malay: jelapang padi) of the country, accounting for about half of Malaysia's total production of rice.

Plain steamed white rice, to be served with side dishes of meat or vegetables, is typically prepared with an electric rice cooker at home. Some households and food establishments prefer to cook rice on a stove top with the absorption method or the rapid-boil method. Compressed rice, called nasi himpit, is another method of preparing and cooking rice: the rice is wrapped with fronds or leaves and compressed into the form of a cylinder, which is then cooked by boiling. The rice would compress and merge during the cooking process. Compressed rice is usually eaten cold with some sort of gravy, although it may be served warm in a broth or soup. A notable variant of compressed rice prepared by the Bugis community is burasak: rice is precooked with coconut milk before it is wrapped in banana leaves and steamed until fully cooked.

Besides the ubiquitous white rice, there are different types of locally grown and imported rice available in the market, and each type has a specific cooking method to bring out optimal results. Glutinous rice (Malay: pulut) is one example: because of its low amylose and high amylopectin content which results in a sticky texture after cooking, glutinous rice is prepared with different measurements and techniques and is not suitably interchangeable with regular rice. It is typically used for making snacks and desserts, but glutinous rice is also prepared as a savoury staple by indigenous peoples like the Orang Asli as well as the Dayak people of Borneo. Lemang is glutinous rice roasted in a hollowed bamboo tube, and is prepared for festive occasions like Ari Gawai, Hari Raya Aidilfitri, and Hari Raya Aidiladha.

A popular dish based on rice in Malaysia is nasi lemak, rice steamed with coconut milk and pandan leaves to give it a rich fragrance. Of Malay origin, nasi lemak is very popular and frequently referred to as the national dish. It is customarily served with ikan bilis or fried anchovies, peanuts, sliced cucumber, hard-boiled eggs and sambal. Although it is often considered a breakfast dish, it is served in a variety of ways and commonly eaten at any time of day due to its versatility. For a more substantial meal, nasi lemak may be served with fried chicken, curries, or a spicy meat stew called rendang.

Congee is a type of rice porridge or gruel popular among Malaysia's ethnic communities. It is eaten primarily as a breakfast food or late supper. It is also considered particularly suitable for the sick as a mild, easily digestible food. Congee is called bubur in Malay; 粥 written in Chinese, pronounced as zhou in Mandarin Chinese and juk in Cantonese; and kanji (கஞ்சி) in Tamil. It may be served plain with little embellishment, or cooked with ingredients like fish slices, seafood, chicken, beef, pork, vegetables, and spices. The importance and popularity of congee in the Malaysian diet is such that bubur ayam or chicken congee is a permanent fixture on the menu of Malaysian McDonald's restaurants.

=== Noodles ===
Noodles are another popular staple, particularly in Malaysian Chinese cuisine, but used by other groups as well. Noodles such as bi hoon (米粉, Hokkien: bí-hún, Malay: bihun; rice vermicelli), kuay teow (粿條, Hokkien: kóe-tiâu) or ho fun (河粉, Cantonese: ho4 fan2; flat rice noodles), mee (麵 or 面, Hokkien: mī, Malay: mi; yellow noodles), mee suah (麵線 or 面线, Hokkien: mī-sòaⁿ; wheat vermicelli), yee meen (伊麵 or 伊面, Cantonese: ji1 min6; golden wheat noodles), dongfen (冬粉, Hokkien: tang-hún, Cantonese: dung1 fan2; cellophane noodles), Lao Shu Fen (老鼠粉, Cantonese: lou5 syu2 fan2; silver needle noodles), and others provide an alternative source of carbohydrate to a serving of rice that accompanies every meal. Stir-fried noodle dishes (Malay: mee goreng) are ubiquitous throughout Malaysia's cities, towns and villages, with numerous localised variants prepared by various ethnic communities according to their culinary traditions and preferences.

=== Bread ===
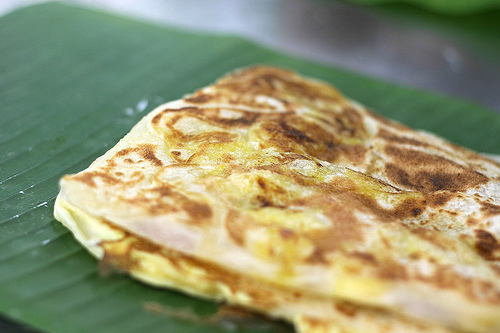
Roti canai

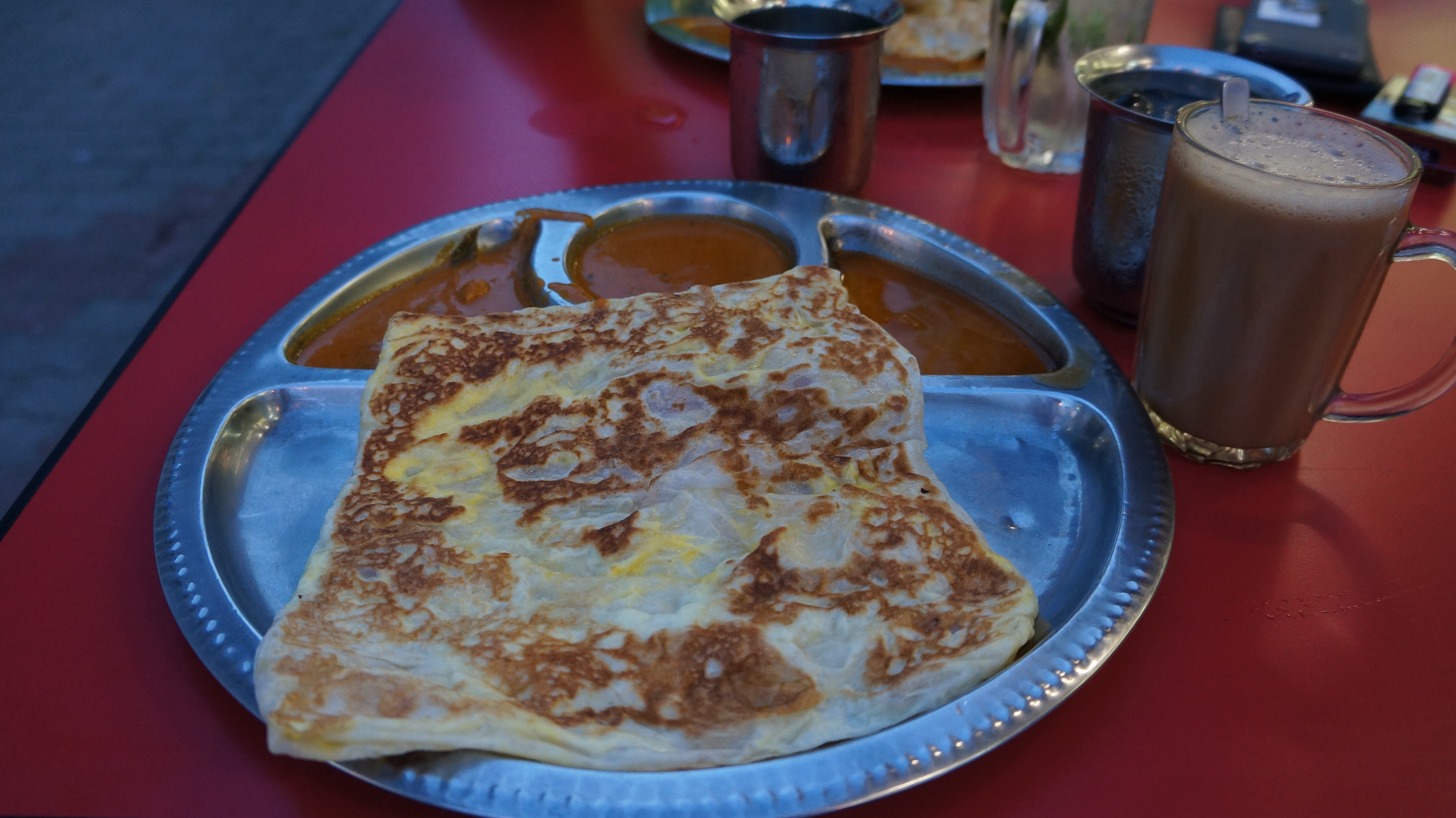
Roti telur and teh tarik

Malaysia does not produce wheat, and all supplies are imported from wheat-producing countries. Nevertheless, Western-style white bread and Indian breads made with wheat flour like roti canai are fairly common foods or is sandwiched along with a layer of kaya between slices of untoasted white bread.

Traditional wheat-based pleated steamed bao or pao (Chinese : 包子) is a Chinese staple which has become tightly woven into Malaysia's gastronomic fabric. Pao are found in restaurants doing brunch dim sum trade, as well as specialist Chinese kopitiam (coffee shops). Sweet fillings may include tausa, lotus seed paste, kaya, pandan, ground peanuts, and custard; savoury fillings may consist of stewed char siu (Chinese : 叉燒), chicken or pork. Malay versions (pau) may be found in night markets (pasar malam) and they are always halal, with fillings of curried potato, chicken or beef. Some variants have a quail egg in the middle in addition to the curry.

Oven-baked buns are also available in specialist bakeries, kopitiam, and restaurants. One local speciality in particular, a bun with a buttery core and topped with a crispy and fragrant coffee pastry crust, has achieved iconic status in Malaysia, and franchises like Rotiboy and Pappa Roti which specialise in these coffee buns have successfully expanded abroad to multiple nations and spawned hundreds of outlets. However, the popular buns that remain a favourite among Malaysians are the buns that are filled with a sweet shredded coconut filling, kaya (coconut jam), pandan kaya (screwpine with coconut jam), sweet corn, chocolate, red bean paste and butter buns.

Roti golok is a type of sweet and soft bread that is commonly eaten in Kelantan. The bread consists of generous amounts of butter, sweetened condensed milk, and sometimes cheese, chocolate, or other toppings. The name "golok" originated from the Golok River, which is located between the Malaysia–Thailand border.

=== Other staples ===
As in Peninsular Malaysia, rice is the undisputed staple food for the majority of the people of Sabah and Sarawak. Rice is central to Kadazandusun culture, and its paramount importance is reflected in the annual Kaamatan festival, as well as traditional beliefs and customs since antiquity which revolve around the veneration of rice spirits. For other ethnic communities throughout Sabah and Sarawak, cassava or tapioca tubers as well as sago starch are also popular staples. The tapioca tuber is as important as rice to the Bajau people of Sabah, while the Dayak peoples of Sarawak make extensive use of both the tuber and leaves of the tapioca plant in their cooking. Sago starch is derived from the pith extracted from the sago palm, and is the staple food for the Melanau and the Penan peoples of Sarawak.

Sago starch is prepared as a gooey and sticky paste by the Bisaya and Kedayan communities called ambuyat, and is called linut by the Melanau. It is eaten by rolling the paste around the prongs of a bamboo fork, and dipping it into soup, sambal, or other varieties of gravies and dipping sauces. Aside from being the source for sago pith, the sago palm is a source of another delicacy for the indigenous peoples of Borneo: the sago grub. Called butod in Sabah and ulat mulong in Sarawak, sago grubs are typically eaten raw but also served deep-fried, roasted or sauteed.

== Protein ==
=== Meat ===
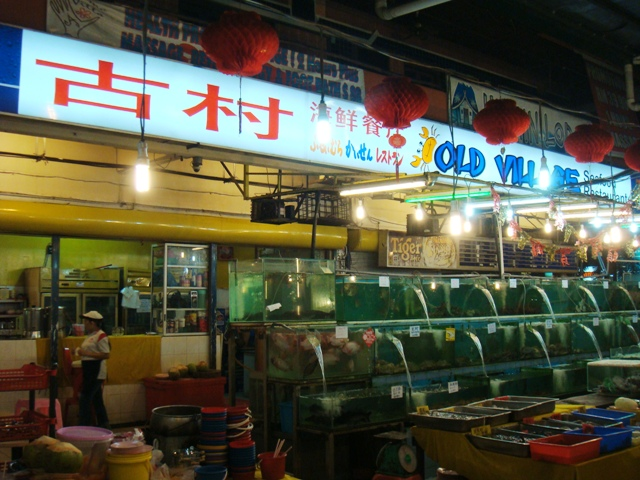
Tanks of fresh seafood at a seafood restaurant in Kota Kinabalu, Malaysia

Malaysian poultry is handled according to halal standards to conform with the country's dominant and official religion, Islam. Imported poultry is available at major hypermarkets, supermarkets and speciality stores, especially in affluent areas where a significant expatriate community can be found.

Fish, both freshwater and saltwater, features prominently in the Malaysian diet. Most local fish is purchased soon after it is caught, while frozen fish is generally imported. Such fish, namely salmon, are frequently eaten in Malaysia but are not found in Malaysian waters. Many types of seafood are consumed in Malaysia, including shrimp or prawn, crab, squid, cuttlefish, clams, cockles, snails, sea cucumber and octopus. In general, members of all ethnic communities enjoy seafood, which is considered halal by Malaysian Muslims (according to Shafi’i fiqh), though some species of crabs are not considered halal as they can live on both land and sea. Sea cucumbers are considered halal.

Beef is common in the Malaysian diet, though the consumption of beef is proscribed by some followers of Hinduism and certain Chinese folk religious sects. Beef can be commonly found cooked in curries, stews, roasted, or eaten with noodles. Malays generally eat beef that is halal. Australian beef prepared under the Government Supervised Muslim Slaughter System (AGSMS) is imported into Malaysia and is halal.

Malaysian Malays, who form about half of Malaysia's population, are Muslim and therefore do not consume pork since Islam forbids it. This does not prohibit others from producing and consuming pork products, and thus pork can be found in wet markets, supermarkets and hypermarkets, usually displayed with a non-halal disclaimer. Pork is consumed by the Chinese communities, Indians, the Iban, the Kadazan, Murut, Lun Bawang/Lundayeh, the Orang Asli, and non-Muslim expatriates.

In Malaysia, the term "mutton" refers to goat meat; lamb, or the meat of a young sheep, is always imported from countries like Australia and New Zealand. In the past mutton was primarily associated with Malaysian Indian cuisine, and was not as widely eaten due to health concerns as well as its perceived gamey flavour. Today, dishes like whole spit roast of mutton, mutton biryani and mutton soup are a common sight at banquets and events. Today, the demand for mutton during the fasting month and Hari Raya period exceeds that for Deepavali and Christmas combined.

== Fruit and vegetables ==
=== Vegetables ===
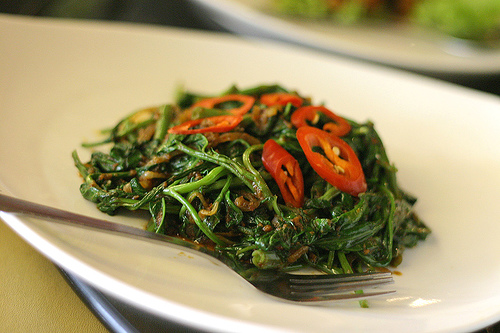
Kangkung belacan

Locally-grown produce is available year-round as Malaysia is a tropical country and does not have four seasons. During rainy seasons, vegetable yields may decrease (which may result in an increase in market price), but rarely if ever stop altogether. Imported produce has made inroads into the market in recent years, either to supplement local demand for essential ingredients like garlic and potatoes, or to supply produce which does not grow well in Malaysia's climate and soil conditions. A few regions in Malaysia, like Cameron Highlands and the foothills adjacent to Mount Kinabalu, provide appropriate mean temperatures and soil conditions for the cultivation of temperate produce like tea.

Malaysian-grown greens, tubers and vegetables commonly found nationwide include amaranth (bayam), bean sprouts (taugeh), brinjals (terung), bitter gourd (peria), bok choi (sawi), cabbage (kobis), choy sum, cucumber (timun), Chinese celery (daun sup), coriander (daun ketumbar), ginger (halia), green beans, water spinach (kangkung), ladies' fingers (bendi), leeks, lettuce, lotus root, maize (jagung), napa cabbage (kobis cina), sweet potatoes (ubi keledek), spring onions (daun bawang), katuk (cekur manis or sayur manis), pumpkin (labu), shiitake mushrooms (cendawan), stink beans (petai), tapioca (ubi kayu), taro or yam (ubi keladi), tomatoes, yambean or turnip, turmeric (kunyit), and yardlong beans (kacang panjang), carrot (lobak merah), and scallions (daun bawang).

In some areas in Malaysia local produce is grown on a small scale, and many rural communities like the Peninsular Orang Asli and certain tribal peoples of Sarawak forage wild edible ferns or vegetables to supplement their diet. Vegetable fern, better known as pucuk paku pakis, is perhaps the most widely available fern and is found in eateries and restaurants throughout the nation. Stenochlaena palustris is another type of wild fern popularly used for food. Endemic to East Malaysia, it is called midin in Sarawak and is prized for its fiddleheads by locals and visitors. It is known by the native peoples of Sabah as lemiding, lembiding or lombiding, where both the leaves and the fiddleheads of the plant are eaten. The young shoots of plants like bamboo and coconut are popularly harvested as food by communities outside urban areas.

A popular way to cook leafy vegetables like kangkung and sweet potato leaves is stir-frying with a pungent sauce made from belacan (shrimp paste) and hot chilli peppers. Other vegetables popularly cooked this way include bean pods and fiddlehead ferns like paku pakis and midin. Vegetables like carrots, cucumbers, onions and yardlong beans are used to make a localised variety of pickle called acar. Vegetables and herbs are also popularly served undressed and often raw in some rural indigenous communities as ulam. An ulam spread may include items such as banana blossoms, cucumber, winged beans, pegaga leaves, petai, and yardlong beans, typically eaten with a pungent dipping sauce like sambal belacan.

=== Fruit ===
Malaysia's tropical climate allows for fruit to be grown all year. A wide variety of common and obscure fruits, either locally grown or imported, are available throughout the country. While the vast majority of fruits grown in Malaysia naturally thrive in the tropics, a few areas in the country like Cameron Highlands or Kundasang in Sabah have different climate zones which enable the cultivation of temperate fruits like strawberries. Fruit is commonly served after a meal as dessert, and fruit juices are sought after as drinks of choice in a climate that is hot and humid all year. Pickled fruits or jeruk are widely available, whether sold from street stalls or specialist shops. Many localities are named after native fruits, most notably Alor Setar (buah setar) and Malacca (buah melaka).

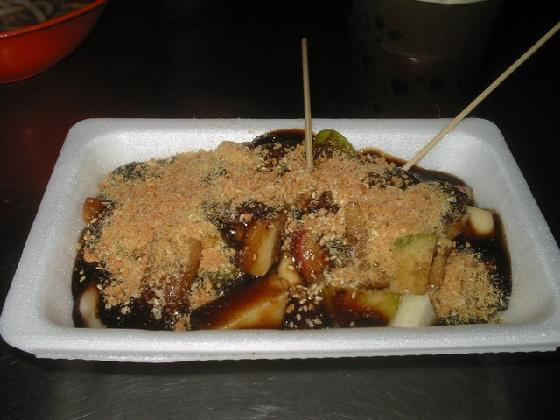
Penang rojak

Fruits are used to make rojak (Chinese: 水果囉喏), a widely served salad. It consists of pieces of fruits and vegetables bound with a viscous dark sauce made from shrimp paste, sugar, chilli, and lime juice. The Penang version is particularly well regarded. The dish is usually topped with a generous sprinkling of toasted ground peanuts.

Notable fruits which are cultivated in Malaysia include:

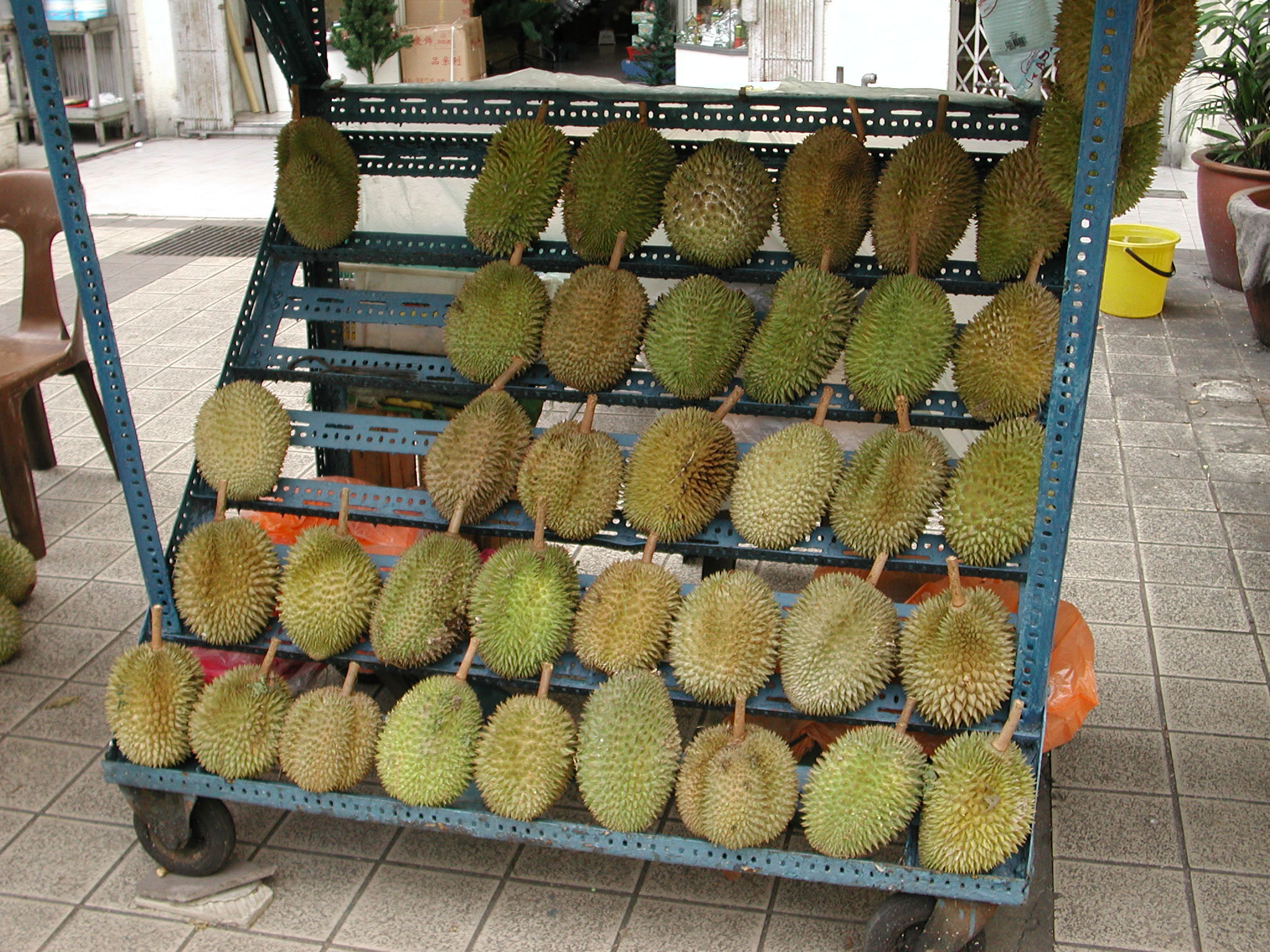
Durians sold from a rack in Kuala Lumpur

- The banana, or pisang in Malay. Many different cultivars are available on the market, and plantain is used for pisang goreng. Other parts of the banana plant may be used for culinary purposes.
- The calamansi lime, or limau kasturi in Malay, is used as a souring agent in Malaysian cooking; the juice of the calamansi lime is also savoured on its own with ice and secondary flavourings like green apple juice, pandan leaves and dried preserved plums.
- The cempedak, a fruit with a large and rough pod-like body. The edible flesh coating each pod is sweet, and has a soft custard-like texture.
- The dragon fruit is available in red-fleshed and white-fleshed varieties.
- The durian, a local tropical fruit with a spiky outer shell and a characteristic odour, is notable because it provokes strong emotions either of loving it or hating it. It is also known as the "king of the fruits". Several species of durian exist throughout Malaysia; common cultivars come with pale cream or yellow arils, whereas some varieties found in Borneo are naturally bright red, orange or purple in colour.
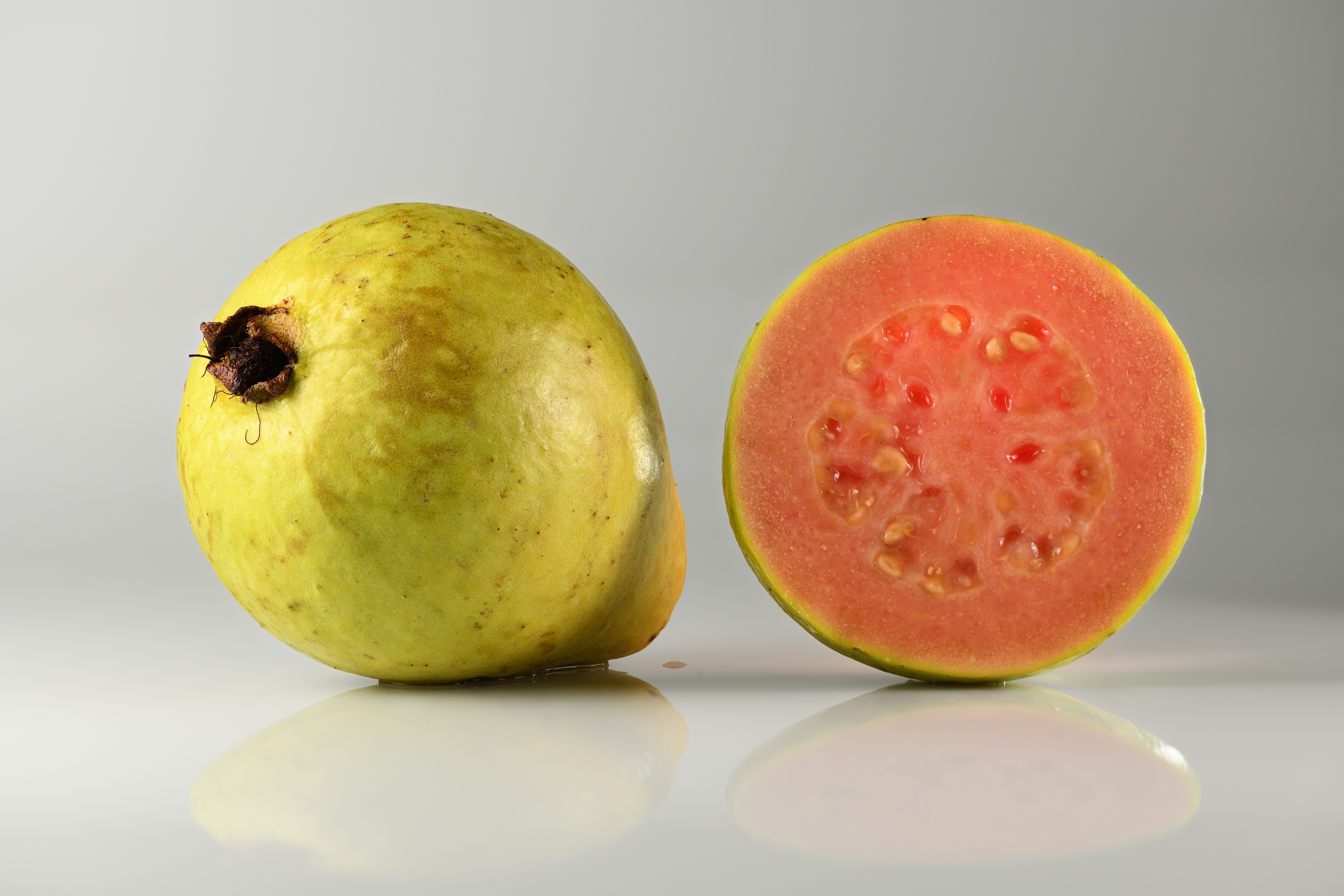
- Guava with slice
  The guava, called jambu or jambu batu in Malay, is a crunchy fruit often eaten plain or garnished with a tart seasoning mix.
- The honeydew, or tembikai susu in Malay, is an aromatic green melon that is often cut up and served with cooked sago pearls in chilled coconut milk as a dessert.
- The jackfruit, or nangka in Malay, is an enormous fruit similar in appearance to cempedak, but quite different in taste and texture. The fleshy covering of each pod is firm and sweet. Unripe jackfruit is occasionally used for cooking savoury meals.
- The kedondong, a small green fruit with an extremely sour taste, usually pickled.
- The langsat, fruits that resemble tiny potatoes and are borne in clusters similar to grapes, with a taste likened to a sweet and tart combination of grape and grapefruit. A second, larger variety known as duku generally bears large, generally round fruit with somewhat thick skin that does not release sap when cooked. The seeds are small with thick flesh, a sweet scent, and a sweet or sour alin.
- The longan, which means "dragon eye" in Chinese. A related species called mata kucing (literally "cat's eye" in Malay) has a virtually identical taste to commercially cultivated longan. However, the mata kucing fruit (Euphoria malaiense) is smaller, the fleshy aril is thinner, and the yellow rind is bumpy and leathery like a lychee fruit.
- The mango, or mangga in Malay. The state of Perlis is famous for its Harumanis variety (from the Mangifera indica cultivar), which is registered as a product of geographical indication (GI) with the Malaysian Intellectual Property Organisation (MyIPO). Another notable species of mango found only in Borneo and used extensively in local cookery is Mangifera pajang, known in Sabah as bambangan and Sarawak as buah mawang.
- The mangosteen, or manggis in Malay. In contrast to the durian, mangosteen is often called the "queen of the fruits".
- The papaya, or betik in Malay, is a common fruit available all year in Malaysia, widely eaten to conclude a meal.
- The pineapple, or nanas in Malay, is widely eaten as a fruit and used extensively in local cooking, such as a curried pineapple dish called pajeri nanas.
- The pomelo, or limau bali in Malay, grows in the Sungai Gedung area in the state of Perak and has been granted GI status. It is also called limau tambun, after the town of Tambun which is also famed for its pomelo produce. As pomelos are associated with traditional Chinese festivities, most farms harvest twice a year in conjunction with Chinese New Year and Mid-Autumn Festival.
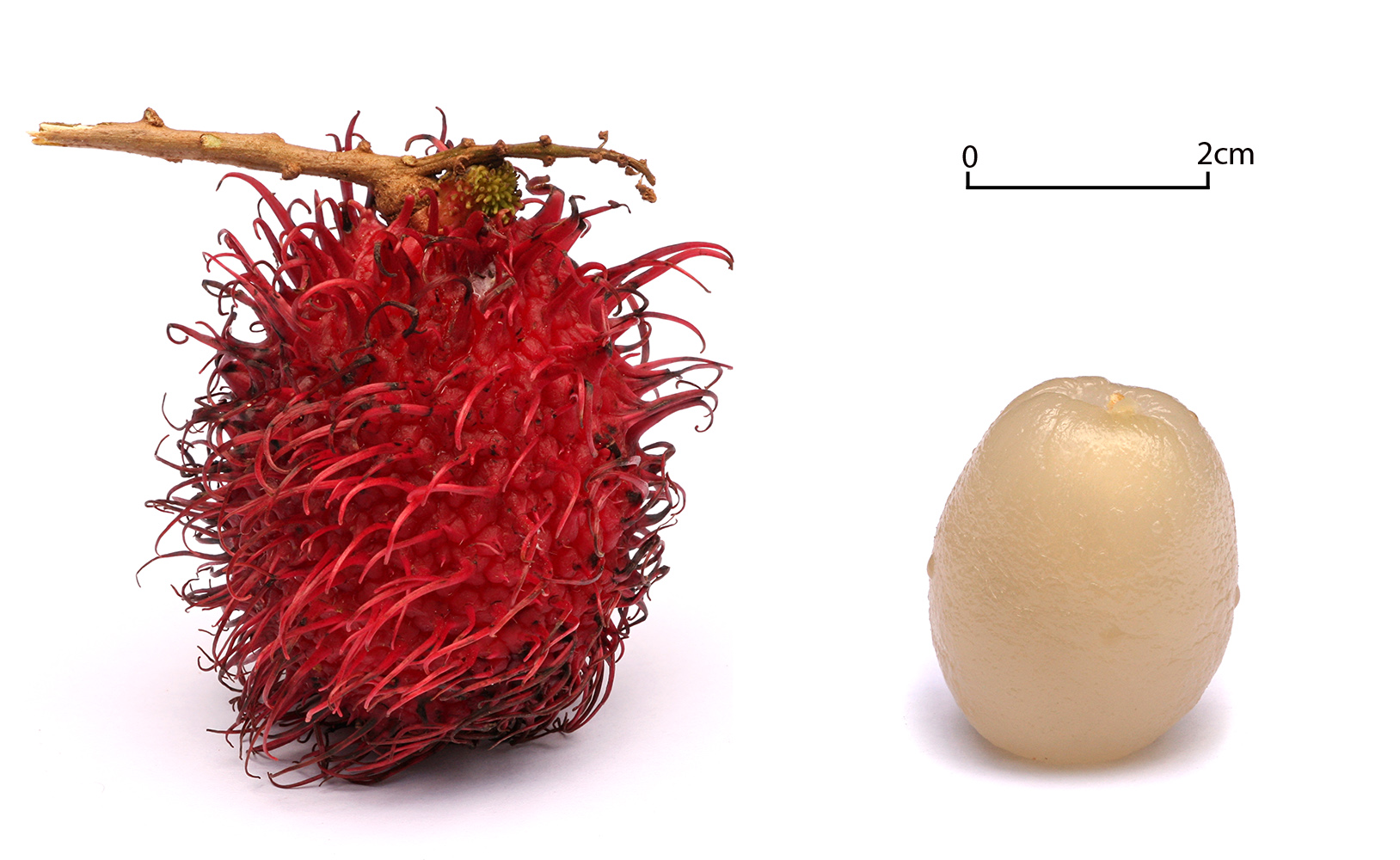
- Rambutan
  The rambutan, as the name suggests, has fleshy pliable spines or 'hairs' on its outer shell, which is usually red or yellow in colour. Once the hairy exterior is peeled away, the tender, fleshy, sweet-and-sour-tasting fruit is revealed.
- The rose apple, called jambu air or jambu merah in Malay, not to be confused with jambu batu or guava. The term refers to various Syzygium species which are grown for their fruit. The fruit may be eaten on its own, or added to a rojak salad.
- The sapodilla, better known locally as buah ciku, has a sweet malty flavour and grainy-textured flesh like a ripened pear.
- The soursop, known as durian belanda in Malay and lampun to the Dusun people of Borneo, is commonly made into juice and smoothies; the leaves of the soursop plant are boiled and drunk as a herbal infusion.
- The starfruit, or belimbing in Malay. Malaysia is a global leader in starfruit production by volume and ships the fruit widely to Asia and Europe.
- The sugar apple, or epal kustard in Malay, comes in red-skinned and green-skinned varieties.
- The tarap, also called marang, is native to Borneo and related to cempedak and jackfruit. While the fruits are about the same size and shape as a durian and also emit a noxious odour, the spines of the tarap are soft and rubbery compared to the durian's hard, thorny spines. The fruit itself is smooth, soft and creamy, and the flavour is reminiscent of sweet custard apple with a hint of tartness.
- The watermelon, or tembikai in Malay, comes in red-fleshed and yellow-fleshed varieties.

== Ingredients ==
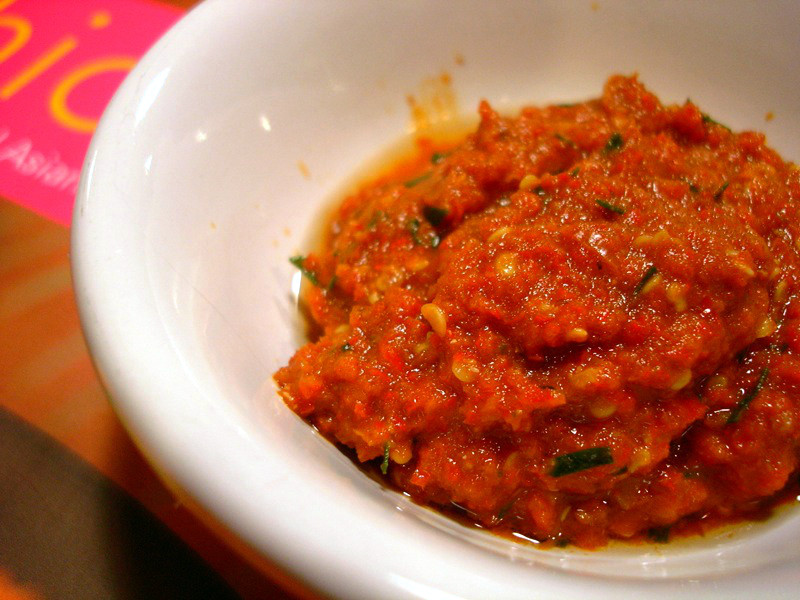
Sambal belacan, made with mixed toasted belachan, ground chilli, kaffir leaves, sugar and water

Chilli peppers are indispensable in Malaysian kitchens, and both fresh and dried forms are used. Chillies come in several sizes, shapes and colours. As a general rule, two type of chilli cultivars are the most commonly available: the bird's eye chilli (cili padi), which although small in size are extremely pungent and very hot; and longer varieties, which tend to be much milder. Green chillies are more peppery in taste, while red chillies, green chillies which have been left to ripen, have a slightly sweeter heat. If a milder flavour is preferred, the seeds and membranes are removed from the chilli pods before they are cut, or the chillies are left whole and removed prior to serving. Some common uses include grinding the chillies into a paste or sambal; chopping fresh chillies as a condiment or garnish; and pickling whole or cut chillies.

Belacan is essential to Malaysian cooking. It is a type of shrimp paste which is pressed into a block and sun-dried. In its raw form it has a pungent smell. Once cooked, the aroma and flavour mellow and contribute a depth of flavour to the dish. To prepare belacan for use, one typically wraps a small amount in foil, which is then roasted over a flame or placed into a preheated oven. Belacan is most commonly pounded or blended with local chilli peppers, shallots and lime juice to make the most popular and ubiquitous relish in Malaysia, sambal belacan. Belacan is also crumbled into a ground spice paste called rempah, which usually includes garlic, ginger, onions or shallots, and fresh or dried chilli peppers. A rempah paste is similar in form and function to an Indian wet masala paste or Thai curry paste, and is often browned and caramelised (Malay: tumis) to mellow the raw flavours of its component ingredients and produce a harmonised finish.

The coconut (Malay: kelapa) is another quintessential feature of Malaysian cuisine, and virtually all parts of the plant are used for culinary purposes. The white fleshy part of the coconut endosperm may be grated, shredded and used as is; dried to make desiccated coconut; or toasted until dark brown and ground to make kerisik. Grated coconut flesh is also squeezed to make coconut milk, which is used extensively in savoury dishes and desserts throughout the country. Coconut oil is used for cooking and cosmetic purposes, and may be either obtained by processing copra (dried coconut flesh) or extracted from fresh coconuts as virgin coconut oil. Coconut water, the clear liquid found inside the cavity of each coconut, is a popular cooler in Malaysia's hot and humid climate. Gula melaka is unrefined palm sugar produced from the sap of the coconut flower. It is the most traditional sweetener in Malaysian cooking and imbues a rich caramel-like flavour with a hint of coconut. Coconut fronds are traditionally used to wrap food, hollowed out coconut husks and shells may be used as a source of charcoal fuel for barbecued meats and traditional pastry making, and even the apical bud or growing tip of the coconut palm is a popular delicacy served in rural communities and specialty restaurants.

Soy sauce of different varieties is another important ingredient. Light soy sauce contributes its pleasantly salty flavour to a variety of stir-fries, marinades and steamed dishes. In some hawker establishments, freshly sliced or pickled chillies arrive immersed in light soy sauce to be used for dipping. Dark soy sauce is thicker, more intense in flavour and less salty. It is often used when a heartier flavour is desired, particularly with masak kicap (a style of braising with a blend of soy sauce varieties) dishes, and also to darken the color of a dish. Kicap manis, sweetened soy sauce sometimes flavoured with star anise or garlic, is also a popular seasoning for cooking. The sweet and savoury taste of kicap manis also functions as a substitute to approximate the combination of dark soy sauce and thick caramel sauce, which is primarily used to colour and season stewed dishes.

Common herbs include lemongrass (Malay: serai), a type of grass with a lemony aroma and flavour. Young, fresh stems are more desirable as older stems tend to acquire a woody texture. The tender white part closest to the base of the stem is thinly sliced and eaten raw in salads, or pounded with other aromatics to make a rempah. It is also used whole in boiled and simmered dishes. The pandan (screwpine) leaf is the Asian equivalent of vanilla in Western cuisine. Its subtle aroma is released when the leaves are bruised by tying one or two long leaves into a knot, and used for cooking curries, rice and desserts. The leaves can also be used to wrap items like rice, chicken or fish for cooking. Pandan leaf is also available in liquid essence or powdered form to flavour and colour cakes. Turmeric (Malay: kunyit) is a rhizome popular for its flavour as well as colouring properties. The leaves and flowers of the turmeric plant are also used in cooking or eaten raw.

Tofu products, specifically fried tofu, are widely used as cooking ingredients and as side accompaniments. While fried tofu can be bland in flavour on its own, its main contribution is texture and especially with tofu puffs, the ability to soak up the flavour of whatever they are cooked in. Fried tofu products are found as a versatile component ingredient for dishes like stir fried noodles, rojak (fruit and vegetable salad), noodle soups, and stews. A popular way of serving fried tofu on its own is a salad with bean sprouts, shredded cucumber and spring onions, covered in a thick sweet and spicy dressing and dusted with roasted ground peanuts. Fried tofu may also be stuffed with a mixture of ground meat or shredded vegetables.

Dried seafood products contribute a savoury depth of flavour to some Malaysian dishes. Small dried anchovies, known as ikan bilis, are very popular. It acquires a crispy texture when deep-fried, and is served as an accompaniment or prepared as a sambal relish in this capacity. Ikan bilis is also boiled to make fish stock; in fact, instant ikan bilis stock granules are a popular seasoning in modern kitchens. Dried shrimp and salted dried fish are also used in various ways.

Other essential seasoning and garnishes include tamarind (Malay: asam jawa), specifically the paste-like pulp extracted from the fruit pod which contributes a tart flavour to many dishes. Candlenuts (Malay: buah keras) are similar in appearance to macadamia nuts, being round, cream-coloured and having a high oil content. Candlenuts are normally ground to thicken sauces. Lup cheong is a type of dried Chinese sausage made from pork and spices. Mainly used by the Malaysian Chinese community, these sweet sausages are usually sliced very thinly and added for additional flavour and texture. Recent studies have shown that there are 62 commonly consumed Malaysian foods that include biogenic amines.

== Structure of meals ==
There is no standard breakfast (Malay: sarapan) menu due to Malaysia's multi-ethnic social fabric as well as the advent of modern influences. Western-style breakfast like breakfast cereal, cooked eggs and toast have become commonplace in homes and when dining out, but heartier traditional fare based predominantly on noodles and rice dishes are still very popular. One may choose to start the day with the ubiquitous nasi lemak or kuih; venture for Chinese-style congee, dim sum and noodle soups; or settle for Indian-influenced fare such as roti canai, idli (Tamil: இட்லி iṭli /ɪɖlɪ/), thosai (Tamil: தோசை tōcai /t̪oːsaj/), and upma. In the state of Kelantan, the term nasi berlauk refers to a breakfast meal which consists of a small serve of rice and complementary dishes or lauk.

For lunch and dinner, food is not customarily served in courses but rather concurrently. A meal may consist of a single dish for solitary diners, or rice with many complementary dishes shared by all. At restaurants where food is cooked to order, there is often no distinction between appetizers/starters and main courses, and food will arrive at the table whenever it is ready. At some traditionally-run eateries where pre-cooked food is served, diners are meant to help themselves by starting with a plate of plain rice and choose from a buffet spread of assorted dishes. Like the Indonesian Nasi Padang, this is not an all-you-can-eat for a fixed price dining experience. The cost of the meal would depend on what the diner selects and how many different items were placed on the plate for consumption. In Malay-run warung (a small family-owned casual eatery or café) or restaurants (kedai makan), this style of dining is known as nasi campur which means "mixed rice". A similar concept exist at some eateries serving home-style Malaysian Chinese food, where it may be known as economy rice (Chinese: 杂饭).

A practice known as "open house" (Malay: rumah terbuka) is popular during festive seasons, and even as an elaborate occasion to celebrate birthdays and weddings. Open house events are traditionally held at the home of the host: well-wishers are received and that everyone, regardless of background, is invited to attend. Home-cooked or catered food is provided by the host(s) at their own expense, and while it is acceptable for guests to bring along gifts for the host, they are expected to help themselves to the food as much as they like. Open house events may also be held at restaurants and larger public venues, especially when hosted by government agencies or corporations.

== Food establishments ==
A kopitiam or kopi tiam is a traditional coffee shop patronised for meals and beverages, predominantly operated by Chinese proprietors and especially members of the Hainanese community. The word kopi is a Malay/Hokkien term for coffee and tiam is the Hokkien and Hakka term for shop (Chinese : 店). A common sight in Malaysia and neighbouring Singapore, menus often feature offerings like nasi lemak, boiled eggs, roti bakar, noodle dishes, bread and kuih. The owners of some kopitiam establishments may lease premise space to independent stallholders, who sometimes offer more specialised dishes beyond standard Chinese kopitiam fare. Typical beverages include Milo, a malted chocolate drink considered iconic to Malaysians of all ages, as well as coffee (kopi) and tea (teh). Diners would use slang terms specific to kopitiam culture to order and customise drinks to their taste.

The omnipresent Mamak stall is a Malaysian institution. Available throughout the country and particularly popular in urban areas, Mamak stalls and restaurants offer a wide range of food and some are open 24 hours a day. The proprietors of these establishments are members of Malaysia's Tamil Muslim community, who have developed a distinct culinary style and wield an enormous influence on Malaysian food culture disproportionate to their numbers. A type of meal served buffet-style at some Mamak eateries is called nasi kandar, which is analogous to the Malay nasi campur where you pay for what you have actually eaten. The diner is to choose from a variety of curried dishes made with chicken, beef, mutton, or seafood. A mixture of curry sauces is then poured on the provided rice: this is called banjir (literally means "flooding").

== Cuisines of Malaysia ==
=== Malay cuisine ===
For a traditional Malay meal, rice is considered the centerpiece of a meal, with everything else considered as an accompaniment, relish or side dish for the rice. Malay cuisine bears many similarities to Indonesian cuisine, in particular some of the regional traditions from Sumatra. It has also been influenced by Chinese, Indian, Thai and many other cultures throughout history, producing a distinct cuisine of their own. Some regional Malay dishes, such as arisa and kacang pool, are examples of influence from Arab cuisine due to longstanding historical and religious ties. Many Malay dishes revolve around a rempah, which is usually sauteed in oil (tumis) to draw out flavours to form the base of a dish. A dipping relish called sambal is an essential accompaniment for most Malay dishes.

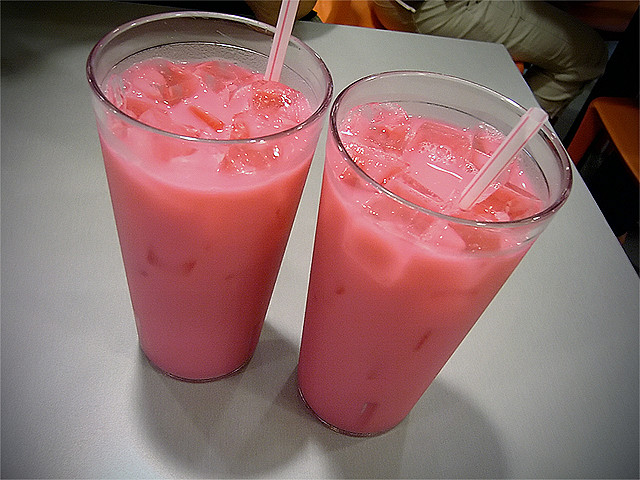
Air bandung

- Air asam cabai picit or air asam picit is a traditional Malaysian dish originated in the northern regions of Malaysia, particularly from states like Kedah and Perlis. This dish features a spicy, savoury yet tangy tamarind-based sauce, known locally as "air asam", which is typically served alongside boiled or grilled fish and ulam-ulaman. The term "picit", meaning "to squeeze" in Malay, refers to the method of preparing the sauce, in which ingredients like bird's eye chilies, belachan and tamarind paste are crushed or squeezed together using fingers to release their flavors.
- Air bandung, a cold milk drink flavoured with rose cordial syrup, giving it a pink colour. Despite the name, there is no connection to the city of Bandung in Indonesia. Bandung within this context refers to anything that comes in pairs or is mixed from many ingredients.
- Air janda pulang, a traditional drink from Negeri Sembilan. It is suitable to drink with lunch and on hot days.
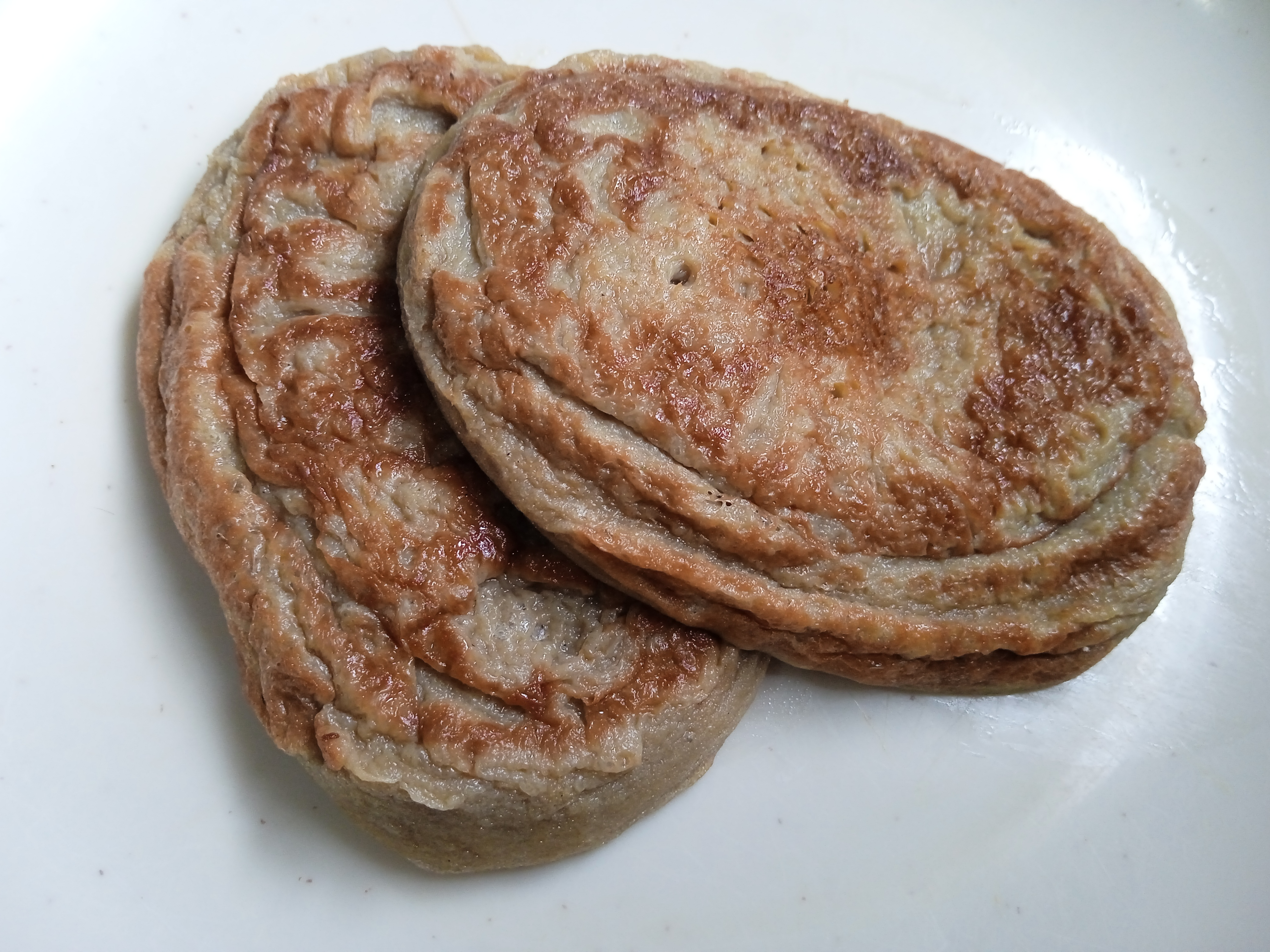
- Akok
  Akok, a traditional sweet dessert in Kelantan, Malaysia. Made mainly from eggs, coconut milk, flour and brown sugar, akok has a distinctive caramel taste. It is often served during afternoon snack together with coffee. Akok is prepared in a special cooking utensil called sarang/dapur tembaga – a mould made of solid brass, which is surrounded with charcoal.
- Apam johol, a sweetened rice cake wrapped in rambai leaves to preserve the aroma and for presentation. A specialty of Negri cuisine, it is sometimes eaten with rendang, sambal tumis and bean porridge.
- Asam pedas, a sour and spicy stew of meat, with the core ingredients being tamarind and chilli. Depending on the region, tomatoes, lady's fingers, shredded torch ginger bud and Vietnamese coriander (Malay: daun kesum) may also be added. Usually cooked with fish like mackerel or stingray, although some recipes use chicken and even oxtail.
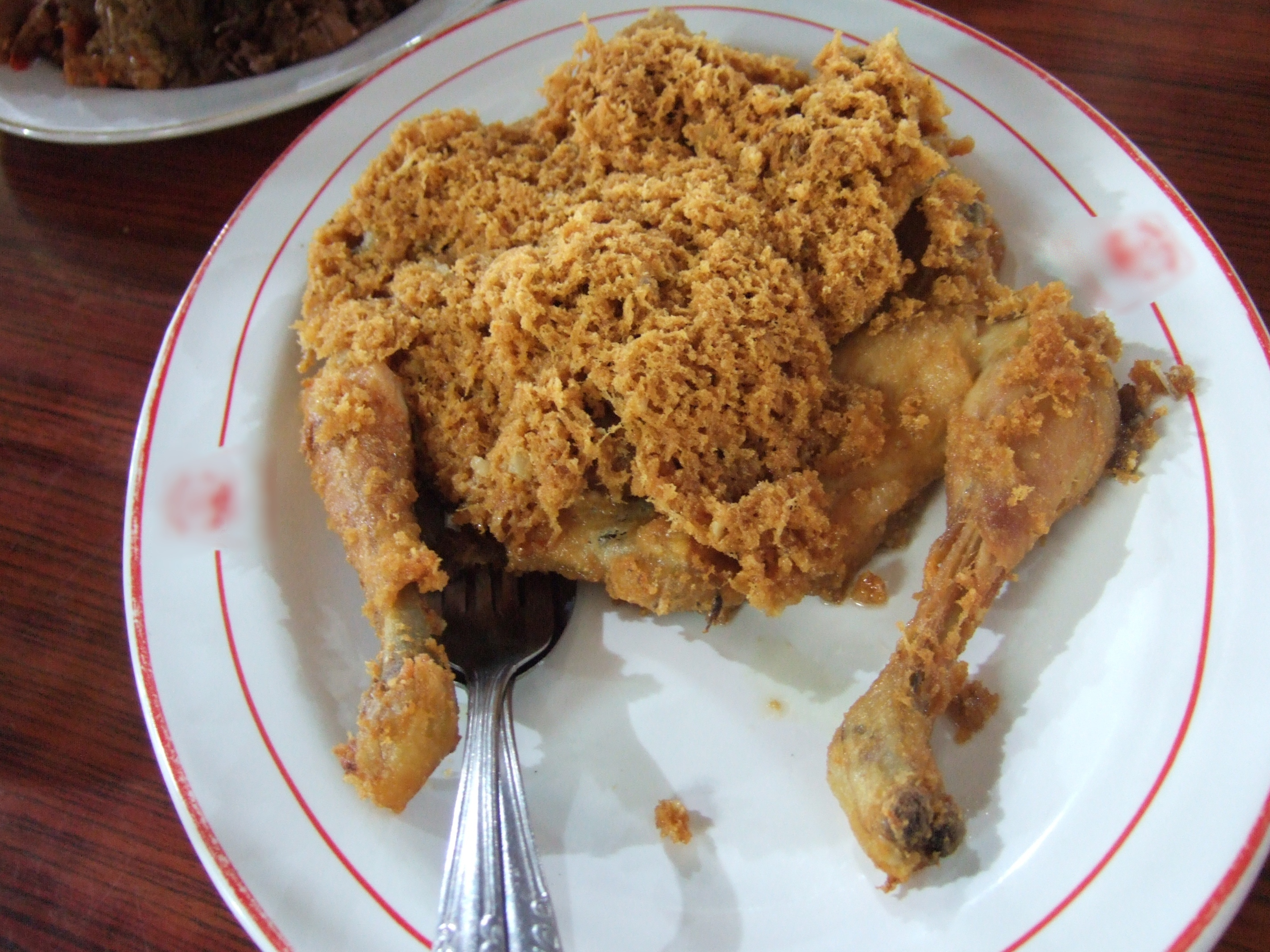
- Ayam goreng
  Ayam goreng, a generic term for deep-fried chicken, typically marinated in a base of turmeric and other seasonings.
- Ayam masak merah, literally meaning 'red-cooked chicken' in English. Pieces of chicken are first fried to a golden brown then slowly braised in a spicy tomato sauce. Peas are sometimes added to the dish, and it is garnished with shredded kaffir lime leaves as well as coriander. It is often paired with nasi tomato–rice cooked with tomato sauce or paste, milk, dried spices, and a sauteed rempah base of garlic, onions, ginger.

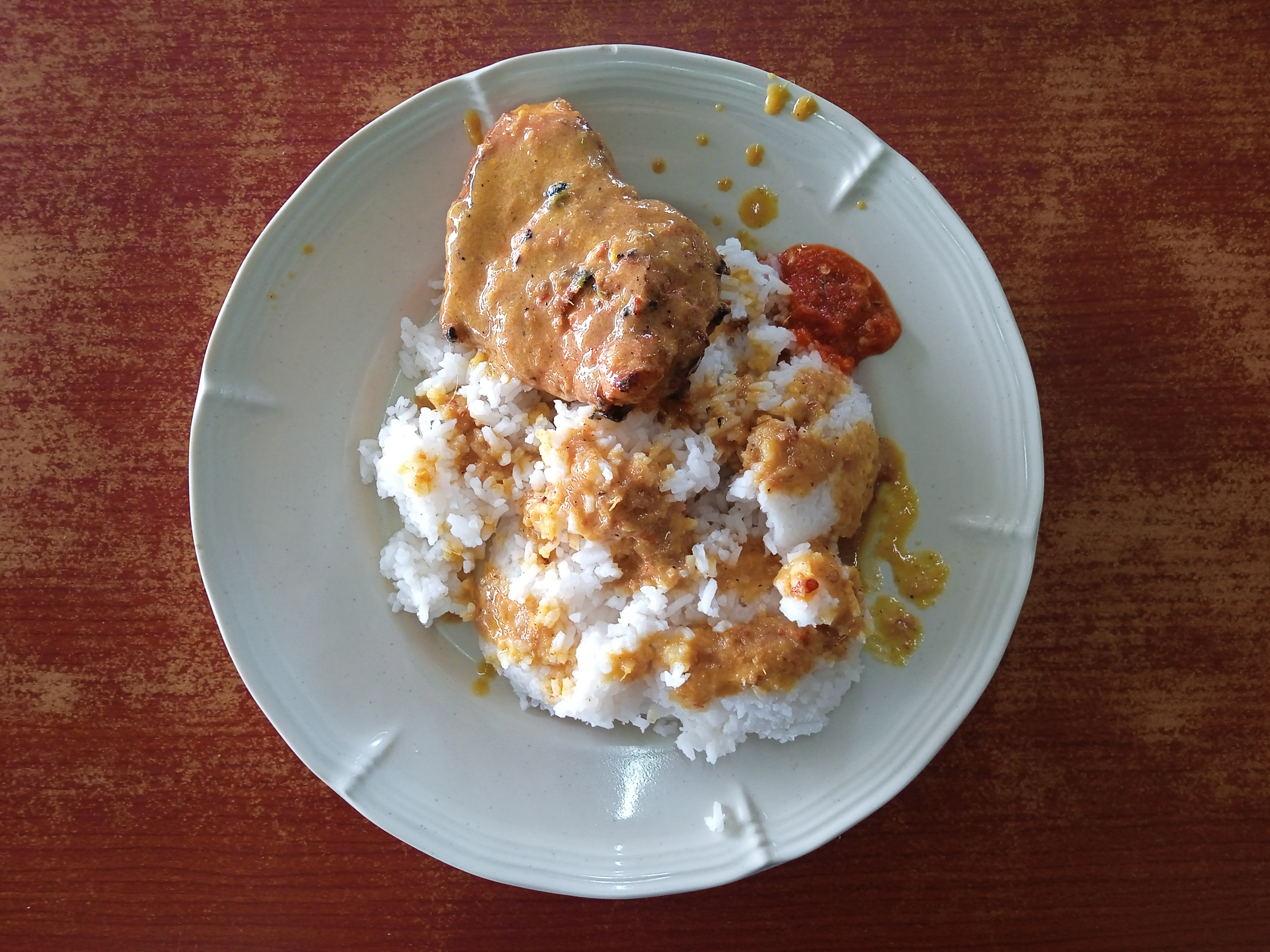
Ayam percik

- Ayam percik, also known as ayam golek in some states, is grilled marinated chicken basted with a spiced coconut milk gravy.
- Bubur lambuk, a savoury rice porridge consumed during the fasting month of Ramadhan, made with a mixture of lemongrass, spices, vegetables, and chicken or beef. It is usually cooked communally at a local mosque, which is then distributed to the congregation as a meal to break the fast every evening. In the state of Terengganu, bubur lambuk is prepared with wild herbs, budu, sweet potatoes, and seafood.
- Gulai, the Malay term for a curried stew. The main ingredients for gulai may be poultry, beef, mutton, various kinds of offals, fish and seafood, and also vegetables such as cassava leaves and green/unripe jackfruit. The gravy is usually yellowish-brown in color due to the sauteed and browned rempah which forms its base, and the addition of ground turmeric. The gravy's consistency may vary in thickness depending on the cook.

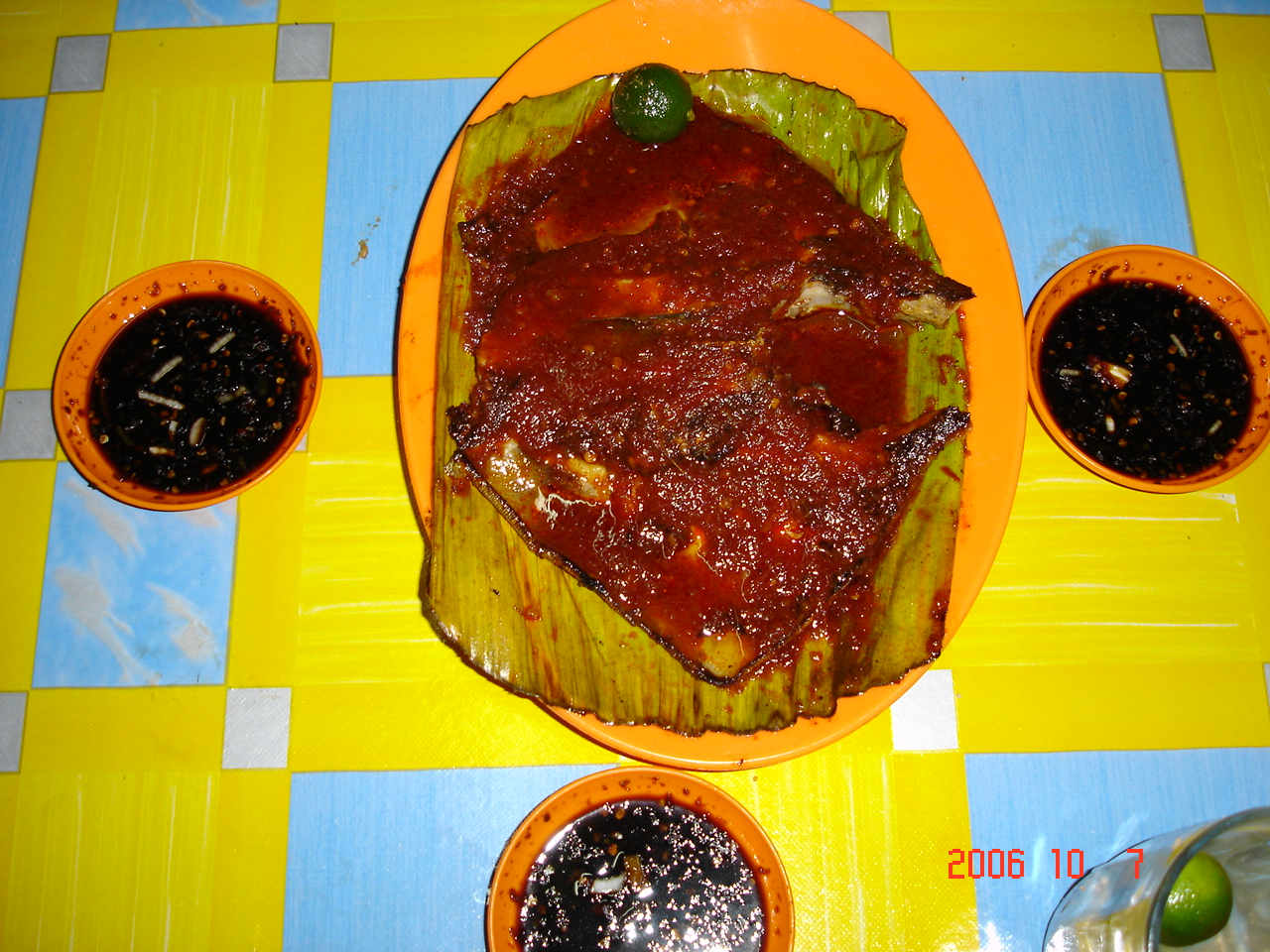
Ikan bakar in Muar, Johor.

- Ikan bakar, barbecued or chargrilled fish, usually smeared with a sambal-based sauce. It may also be accompanied with air asam, a dip made from shrimp paste, onion, chillis and tamarind juice.
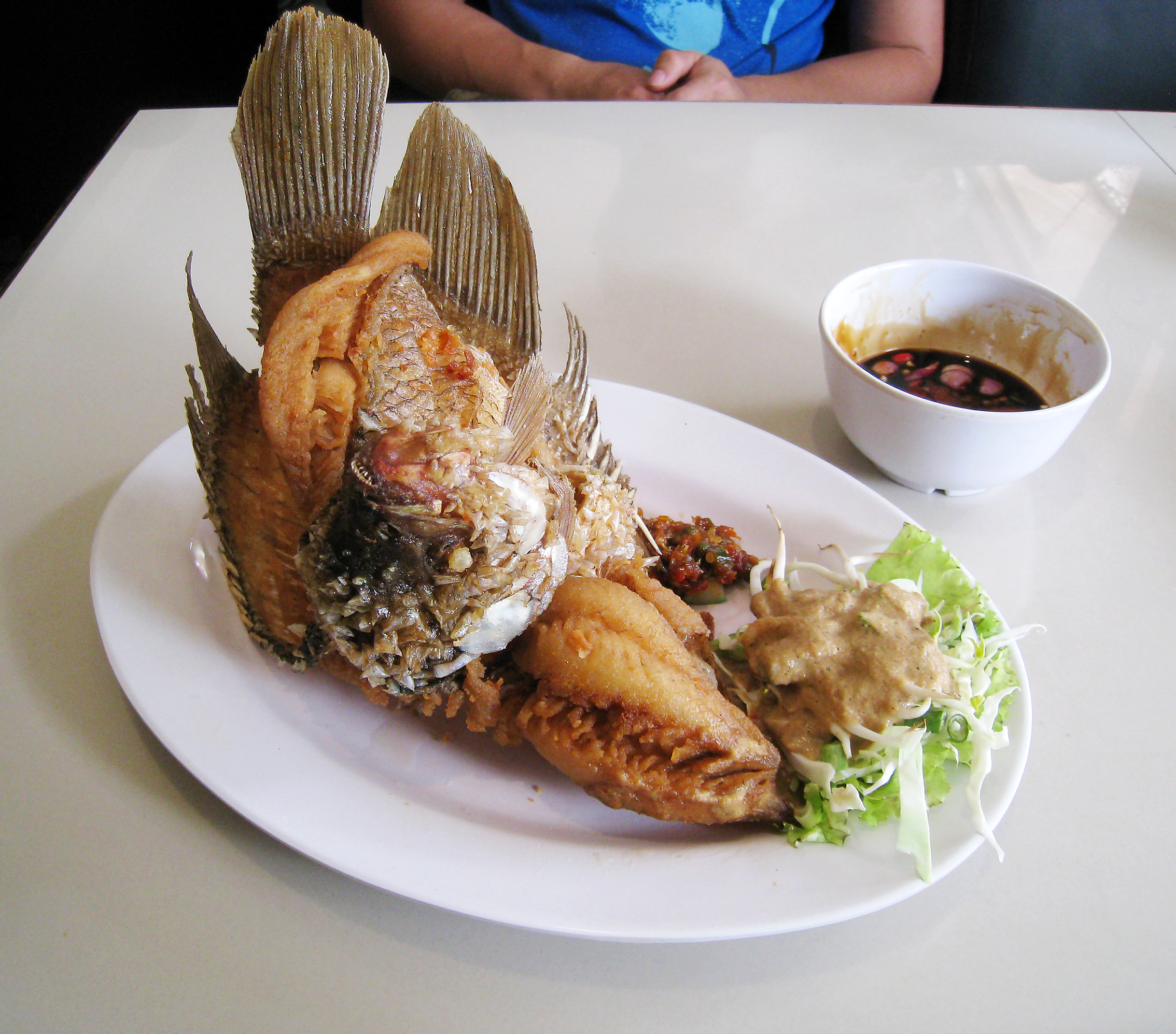
- Ikan goreng
  Ikan goreng, a generic term for shallow- or deep-fried fish, which is almost always marinated prior to cooking. There are countless recipes and variants for what is arguably the most typical method of cooking fish in Malaysia.
- Kebebe, a specialty of Lenggong, Perak, is a fruit salad consisting of 13 ingredients that provide a balance of spicy, sweet and tangy flavours when mixed. It is allegedly able to cure nausea after eating too much.
- Kerabu, a type of salad-like dish which can be made with any combination of cooked or uncooked fruits and vegetables, as well as the occasional meat or seafood ingredient. There are many kerabu recipes, which often have little in common in preparation: kerabu taugeh is made with blanched bean sprouts and quintessentially Malay ingredients like kerisik, while preparations like kerabu mangga (shredded green mango salad) resemble a Thai-style yam salad in taste profile, kerabu maggi using Maggi noodles, and kerabu sare is made with seaweed, stewed fish and coconut, sambal and lime juice.
- Keropok lekor, a speciality of the state of Terengganu and other states on the east coast of Peninsula Malaysia. Keropok lekor is a savoury fritter made from a combination of batter and shredded fish. Sliced and fried just before serving, it is eaten with hot sauce.
- Kerutuk daging, a type of coconut milk-based curry. Traditionally it is best eaten with white rice, sambal belacan and ulam-ulaman or Malay salad.
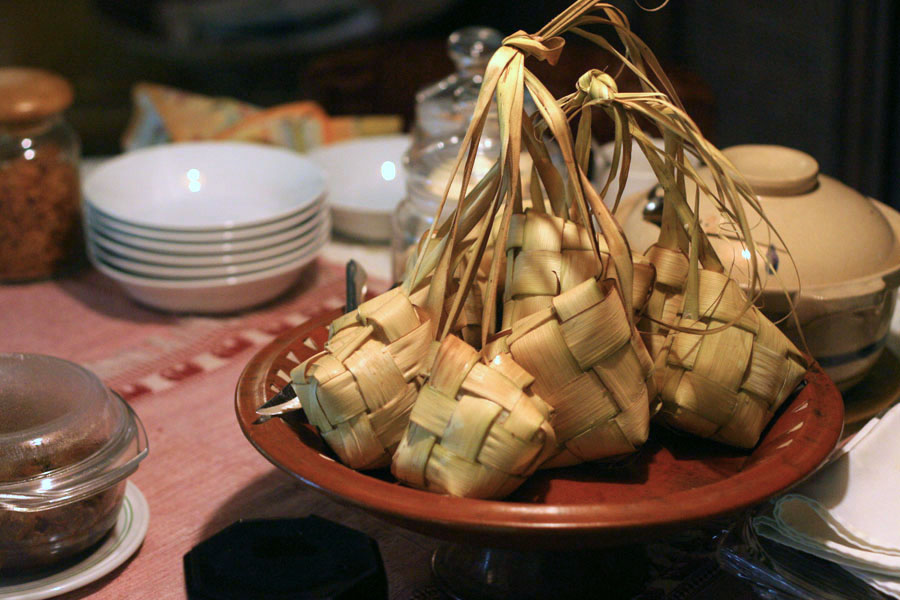
- Ketupat
  Ketupat, a variant of compressed rice, wrapped in a woven palm frond pouch. As the rice boils, the grains expand to fill the pouch and the rice becomes compressed. This method of cooking gives the ketupat its characteristic form and texture. Usually eaten with rendang (a type of dry beef curry) or served as an accompaniment to satay, ketupat is also traditionally served on festive occasions such as Eid (Hari Raya Aidilfitri) as part of an open house spread.
- Kuzi ayam, a thick curry. Traditionally it is eaten with white rice, sambal belacan and ulam.
- Laksam or laksang, a different variant of laksa found in the northern and northeastern states of the Peninsular. Laksam consists of thick flat rice noodle rolls in a full-bodied, rich and slightly sweet white gravy of minced fish, coconut milk and shredded aromatic herbs.
- Masak lemak is a style of cooking which employs liberal amounts of turmeric-seasoned coconut milk. Sources of protein like chicken, seafood smoked meats and shelled molluscs, perhaps paired with fruits and vegetables such as bamboo shoots, pineapples and tapioca leaves are often cooked this way. Certain states are associated with a specific variant of this dish: for example, masak lemak cili api/padi is a speciality of Negeri Sembilan.

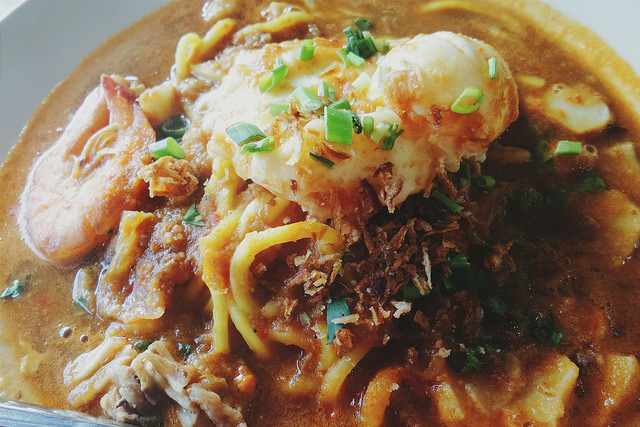
Authentic mee bandung from Muar

- Mee bandung Muar, a traditional noodle dish from Muar that is cooked with yellow noodles coupled with egg in addition to a thick broth-gravy made of a combination of dried shrimps, onion, spices, shrimp paste and chillies. Prawn, meat, fish cakes and vegetables are also added.

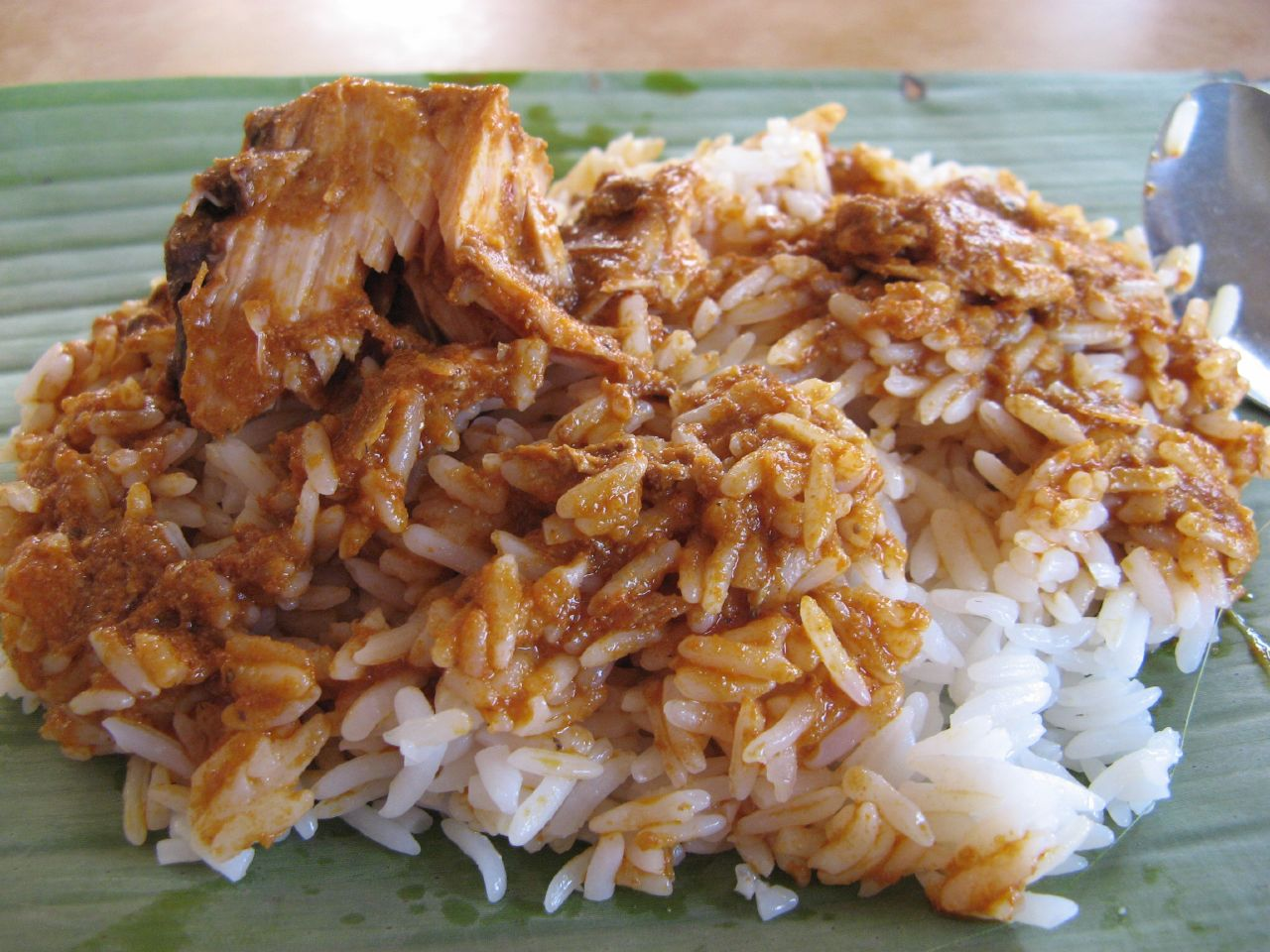
Nasi dagang

- Mee calong, a noodle dish eaten with fish soup, fish balls, and tofu puffs. This was a traditional cuisine of Beserah.
- Mee siput Muar, a deep-fried circular dried noodle snack from Muar, Johor made from flour and eaten with sambal.
- Nasi beringin, a fragrant rice dish that used to be served to Johor royalties in the late 1890s; the sultans would have this fragrant dish especially when guests were invited to dine in the palace.
- Nasi bujang, a simple rice dish that typically consists of rice, a fried omelette, sambal belacan and plain soup.
- Nasi dagang, rice cooked with coconut milk and fenugreek seeds, served with a fish gulai (usually tuna or ikan tongkol), fried shaved coconut, hard-boiled eggs and vegetable pickles. Nasi dagang ("trader's rice" in Malay) is a staple breakfast dish in the northeastern states of Kelantan and Terengganu. It should not be confused with nasi lemak, as nasi lemak is often found sold side by side with nasi dagang for breakfast in the east coast of Peninsular Malaysia.

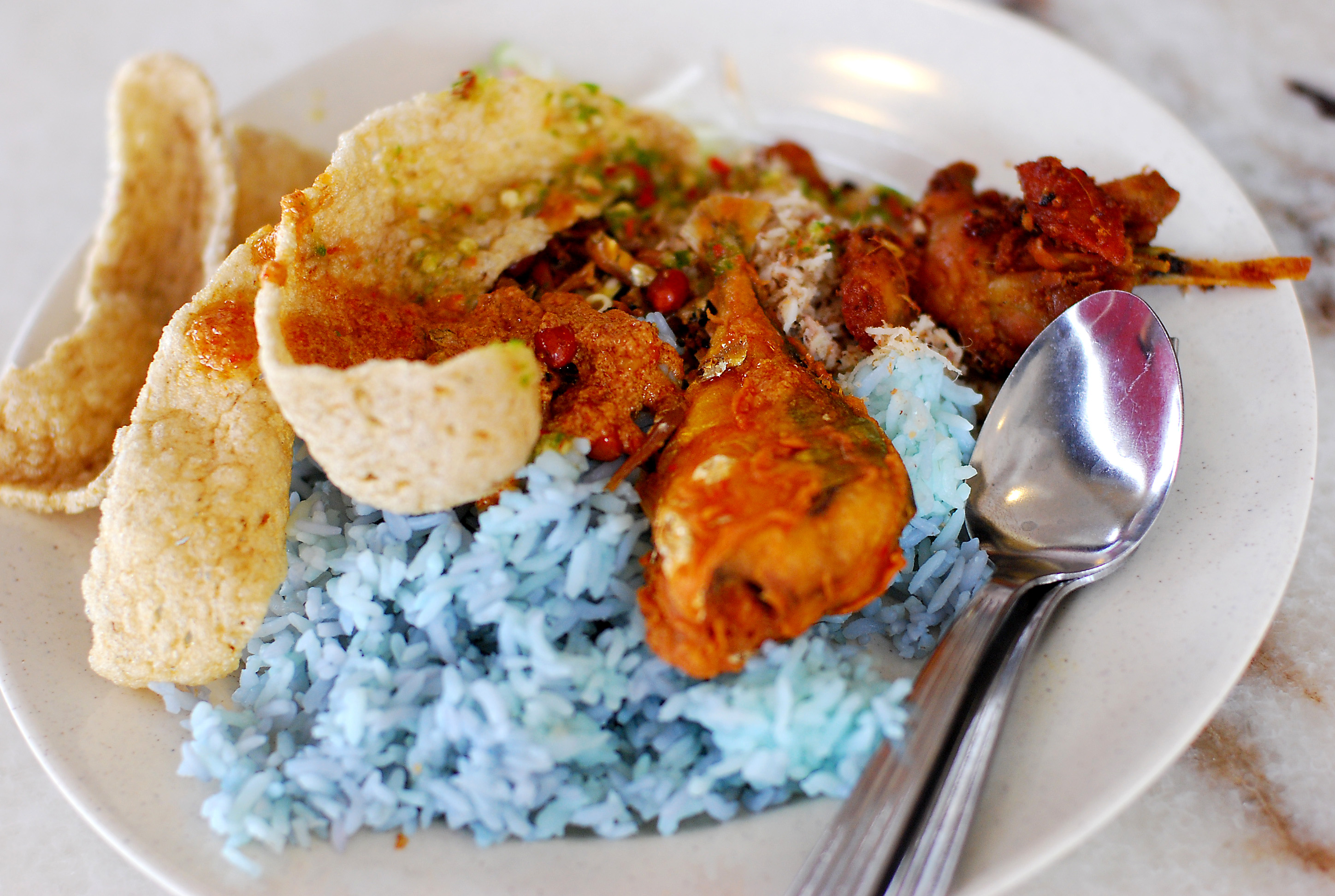
Nasi kerabu

- Nasi goreng, a generic term for fried rice, of which there are many, many different permutations and variations. Variants include nasi goreng kampung, nasi goreng pattaya, and nasi paprik.
- Nasi kandar, a meal of steamed rice that is served with a variety of curries and side dishes. It is a popular northern Malaysian dish from Penang.
- Nasi lemuni, a rice dish that is eaten like nasi lemak but cooked with an herb called daun lemuni (Vitex trifolia leaves).
- Nasi tumpang, rice packed in a cone-shaped banana leaf. A pack of nasi tumpang consists of an omelette, meat floss, chicken or shrimp curry and sweet gravy. It is traditionally served as a meal of convenience for travellers on the road.
- Nasi ulam, rice salad tossed with a variety of thinly shredded herbs and greens (daun kaduk, daun cekur, daun kesum and so on) as well as pounded dried shrimp, kerisik and chopped shallots. A variant popular in the eastern coast states of Peninsular Malaysia is called nasi kerabu, which is blue-coloured rice served with various herbs, dried fish or fried chicken, crackers, pickles and vegetables.
- Pek nga, also known as lempeng kelapa. It is usually served during breakfast.
- Puding diraja, also known as royal pudding, is a dessert that was developed and served to the royal family of Pahang state.
- Rendang, a spicy meat and coconut milk stew originating from the Minangkabau people of Indonesia, many of whom have settled in the state of Negeri Sembilan. Buffalo meat is the most traditional choice for this dish, but beef and chicken are by far more commonly used for rendang in restaurants and home cooking. The common addition of kerisik is another distinctively Malaysian touch. Rendang is traditionally prepared by the Malay community during festive occasions, served with ketupat or nasi minyak.

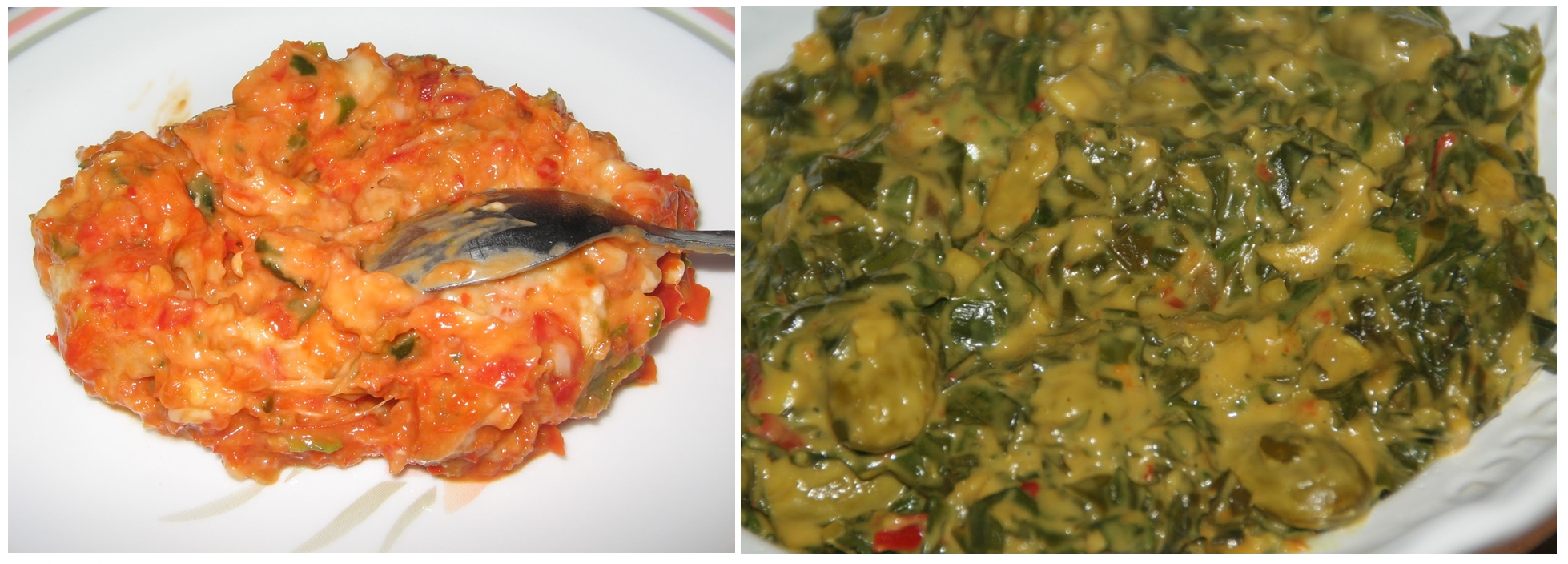
Raw (l) and cooked (r) sambal tempoyak

- Roti jala, a name derived from the Malay words roti (bread) and jala (net). A special ladle with a five-hole perforation is used to form its lacy pattern. Roti jala is usually eaten as an accompaniment to a curried dish, or served as dessert with a sweet dipping sauce.
- Roti john, a spiced meat omelette sandwich, popularly eaten for breakfast or as a snack.

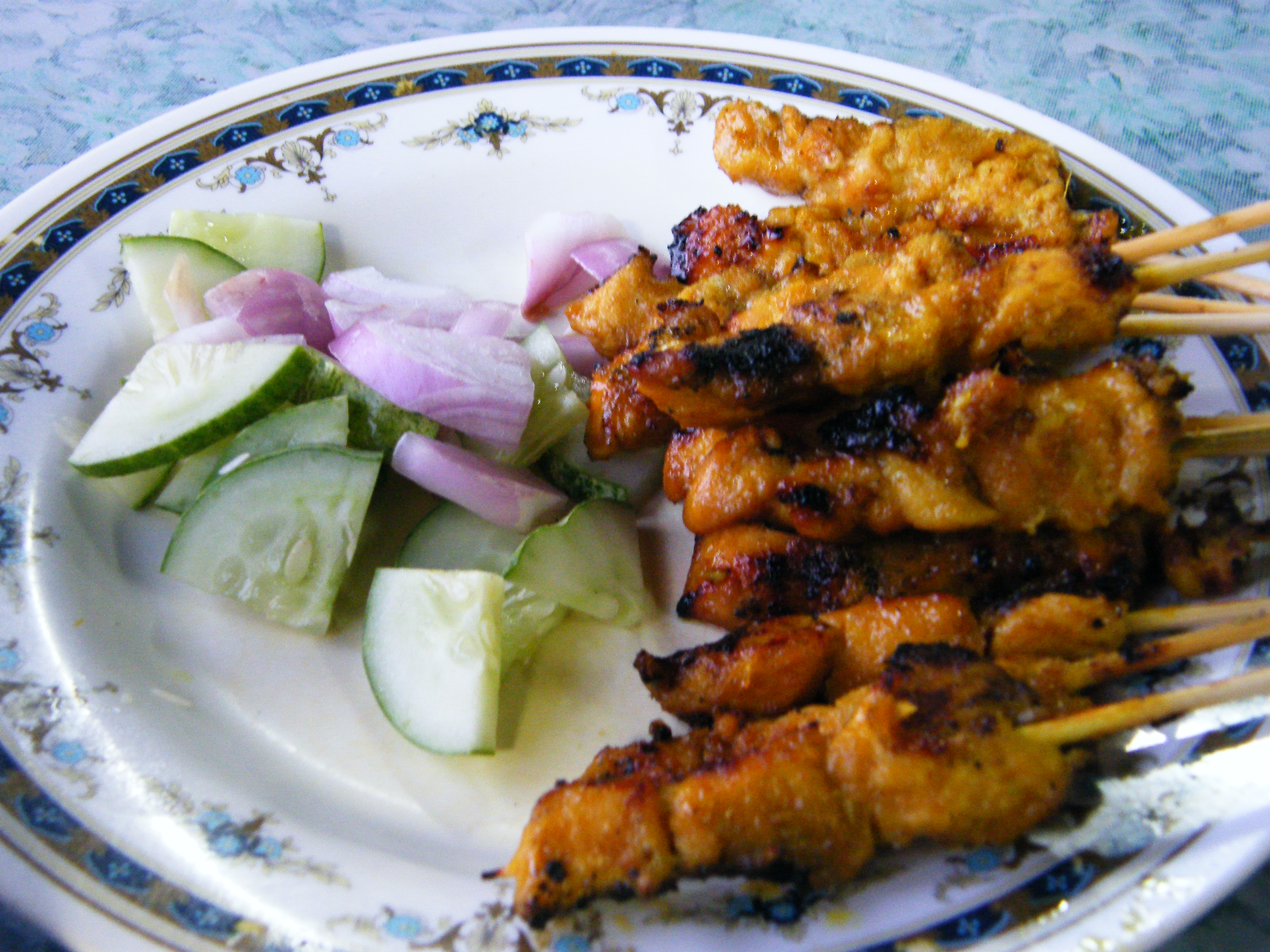
Sate

- Sambal, a term not only referring to a relish-like sauce made from chilli peppers pounded together with secondary ingredients like belacan and thinned with calamansi lime juice; it can also refer to a cooking style in which meat, seafood, and vegetables like brinjal (Malay: sambal terung) and stink bean (Malay: sambal petai) are braised in a spicy sambal-based sauce.
- Satay, one of Malaysia's most popular foods. Satay (written as sate in Malay) is made from marinated beef and chicken pieces skewered with wooden sticks and cooked on a charcoal grill. It is typically served with compressed rice, cut onions, cucumber, and a spiced peanut gravy for dipping. The town of Kajang in Selangor is famous for its satay; sate Kajang is a term for a style of sate where the meat chunks are bigger than those of a typical satay, and the sweet peanut sauce is served along with a portion of fried chilli paste.
- Serunding, spiced meat floss. Serunding may also refer to any dish where the primary meat or vegetable ingredient is shredded and pulled into thin strands. In Indonesia, this term strictly refers to a dry-toasted grated coconut mix instead.
- Sup kambing, a hearty mutton soup slowly simmered with aromatic herbs and spices, and garnished with fried shallots, fresh cilantro and a wedge of calamansi lime. Variants include soups cooked with beef (Malay: daging), beef ribs (Malay: tulang), or oxtail (Malay: buntut/ekor), all seasoned with the same herbs and spices.
- Tempoyak, fermented durian, traditionally stored in an urn. Tempoyak may be eaten as relish, or it can be added to braised dishes and stews as a primary flavouring (masak tempoyak).

==== Javanese-influenced cuisine ====
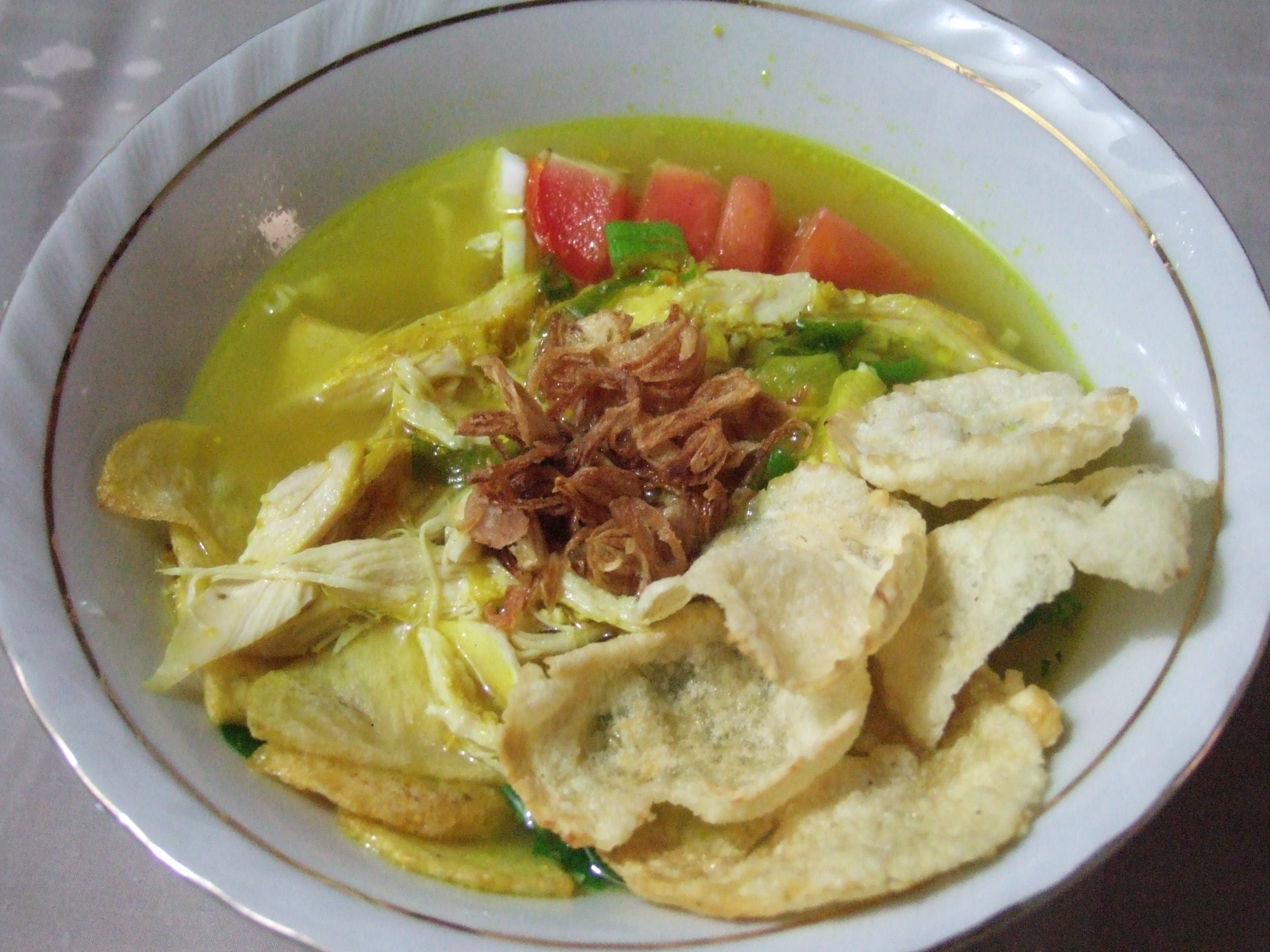
Soto ayam, (chicken soto). Note the transparent yellow broth, the emping and fried shallot

There are certain Malaysian dishes with overt Javanese influences or are direct adaptations from Javanese cuisine, brought to Malaysia by Javanese immigrants who have been assimilated or integrated into the wider Malay community to various degrees. Javanese cuisine is highly distinct from mainstream Malay cooking, being noted for its simplicity and sweeter flavours, as opposed to mainstream Malay cuisine which is predominantly based on the complex and spicy regional cuisines of Sumatra. A popular way of serving Javanese-influenced food in the southern part of Peninsular Malaysia is termed nasi ambang, which consists of shared platters of white rice served with accompaniments like chicken cooked in soy sauce or curried gravy, stir-fried noodles, sambal goreng, fried shredded coconut pieces, egg, vegetables and so on.

- Ayam penyet, deep-fried chicken which is smashed prior to serving. The other key component to this dish is a spicy sambal. Other accompaniments include cucumbers, fried tofu and tempeh.
- Begedil, spherical fritters made from mashed potato and occasionally ground meat. It is called perkedel in Indonesia.
- Botok botok, steamed banana leaf parcels of sliced fish seasoned with ground spices and shredded herbs.
- Lontong, vegetables stewed in a lightly spiced coconut milk soup, usually served with compressed rice and additional condiments added either during cooking or in individual servings. It is eaten during festive occasions, and also as a breakfast meal. In Indonesia this dish would be called sayur lodeh, and the compressed rice lontong.
- Nasi kuning, rice cooked with coconut milk and turmeric. A common breakfast dish in certain regions like the east coast of Sabah, where it is typically served with sambal, eggs, coconut-based serundeng, and spiced fish. Not to be confused with the Peranakan nasi kunyit, which uses glutinous rice.
- Mee rebus, a dish which consists of egg noodles drenched in a spicy aromatic sauce thickened with cooked and mashed tuber vegetables. Versions of mee rebus found in other parts of Malaysia are sometimes called mee jawa, perhaps as a nod to its likely Javanese origin.
- Pecal is a vegetable salad with cucumber slices, long beans, bean sprouts, fried tofu, blanched kangkung and tempeh dressed in a peanut sauce.
- Rempeyek, a deep-fried savoury cracker made from flour (usually rice flour) with other ingredients (such as peanuts) bound or coated by crispy flour batter.
- Soto. Meat broth, typically served with plain rice, lontong, or noodles depending on regional variation as well as personal preference.
- Telur pindang, marbled eggs boiled with herbs and spices. Commonly seen in Javanese Malaysian wedding feasts and festive occasions, particularly in Johor.
- Tempeh, a staple source of protein in Javanese cuisine, made by a natural culturing and controlled fermentation process that binds soybeans into a cake form, similar to a very firm vegetarian burger patty, which can then be cooked and served in a variety of ways.

=== Malaysian Chinese cuisine ===
Malaysian Chinese cuisine is derived from the culinary traditions of Chinese Malaysian immigrants and their descendants, who have adapted or modified their culinary traditions under the influence of Malaysian culture as well as immigration patterns of Chinese to Malaysia. Because the vast majority of Chinese Malaysians are descendants of immigrants from southern China, Malaysian Chinese cuisine is predominantly based on an eclectic repertoire of dishes with roots from Cantonese cuisine, Hakka cuisine, Fujian cuisine and Teochew cuisine.

As these early immigrants settled in different regions throughout what was then British Malaya and Borneo, they carried with them traditions of foods and recipes that were particularly identified with their origins in China, which gradually became infused with the characteristics of their new home locale in Malaysia while remaining distinctively Chinese. For example, Hainanese chicken rice is usually flavoured with tropical pandan leaves and served with chilli sauce for dipping, and tastes unlike the typical chicken dishes found in Hainan Island itself. Some of these foods and recipes became closely associated with a specific city, town or village, eventually developing iconic status and culminating in a proliferation of nationwide popularity in the present day.

Chinese food is especially prominent in areas with concentrated Chinese communities, at roadside stalls, hawker centres and kopitiam, as well as smart cafes and upmarket restaurants throughout the nation. Many Chinese dishes have pork as a component ingredient, but chicken is available as a substitution for Muslim customers from the wider community, and some Chinese restaurants are even halal-certified.

A sample of representative Malaysian Chinese dishes found nationwide include:

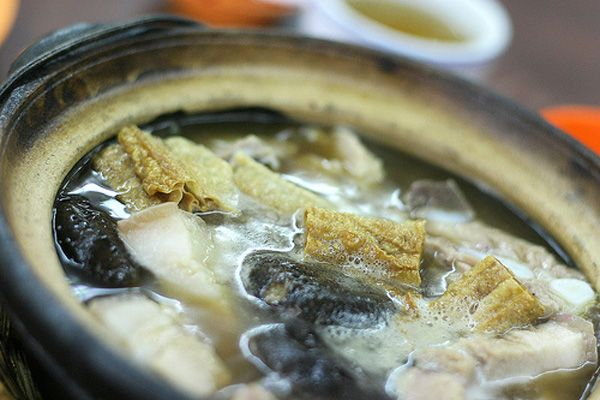
Bak Kut Teh

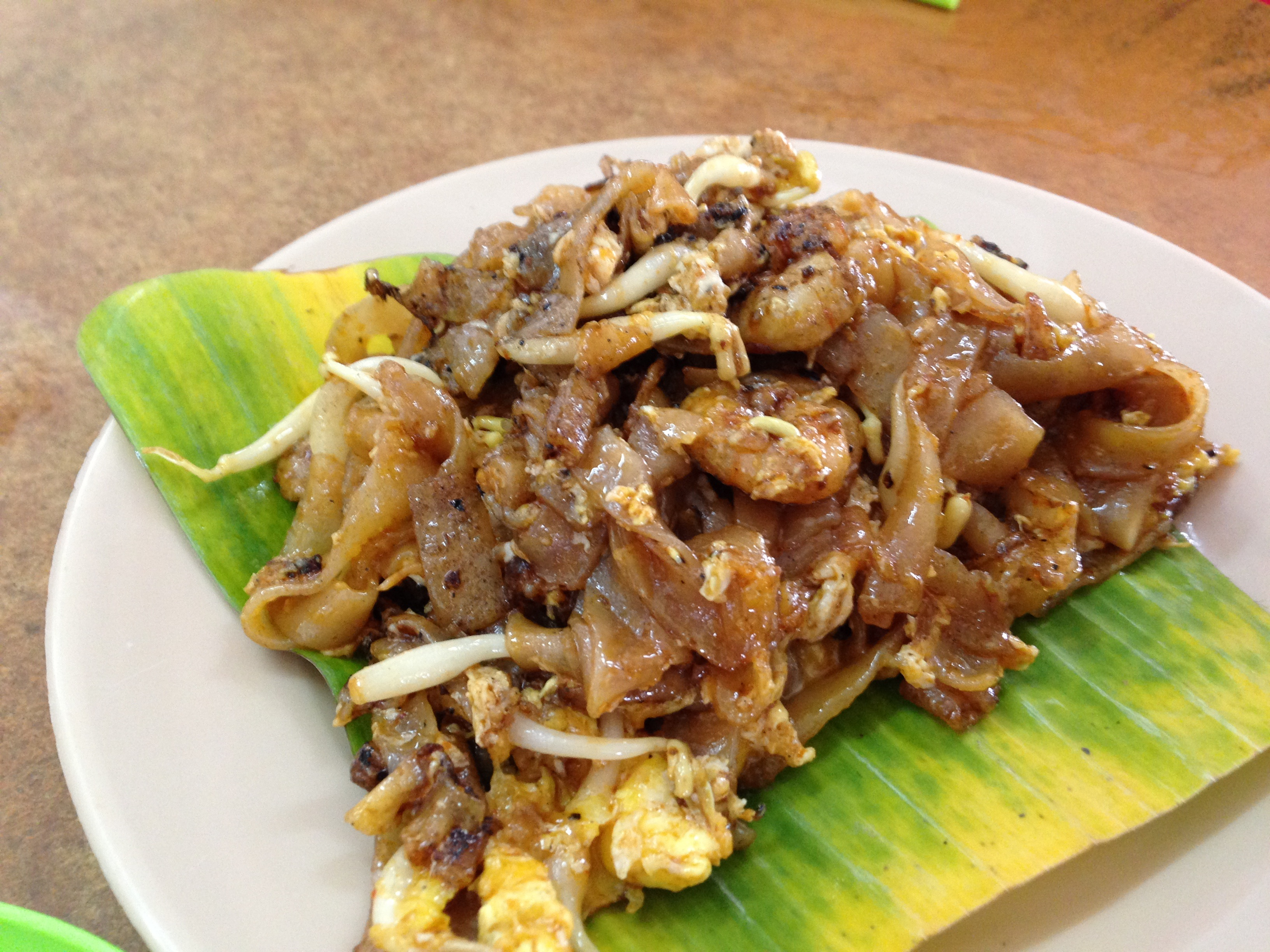
Char kway teow in Penang

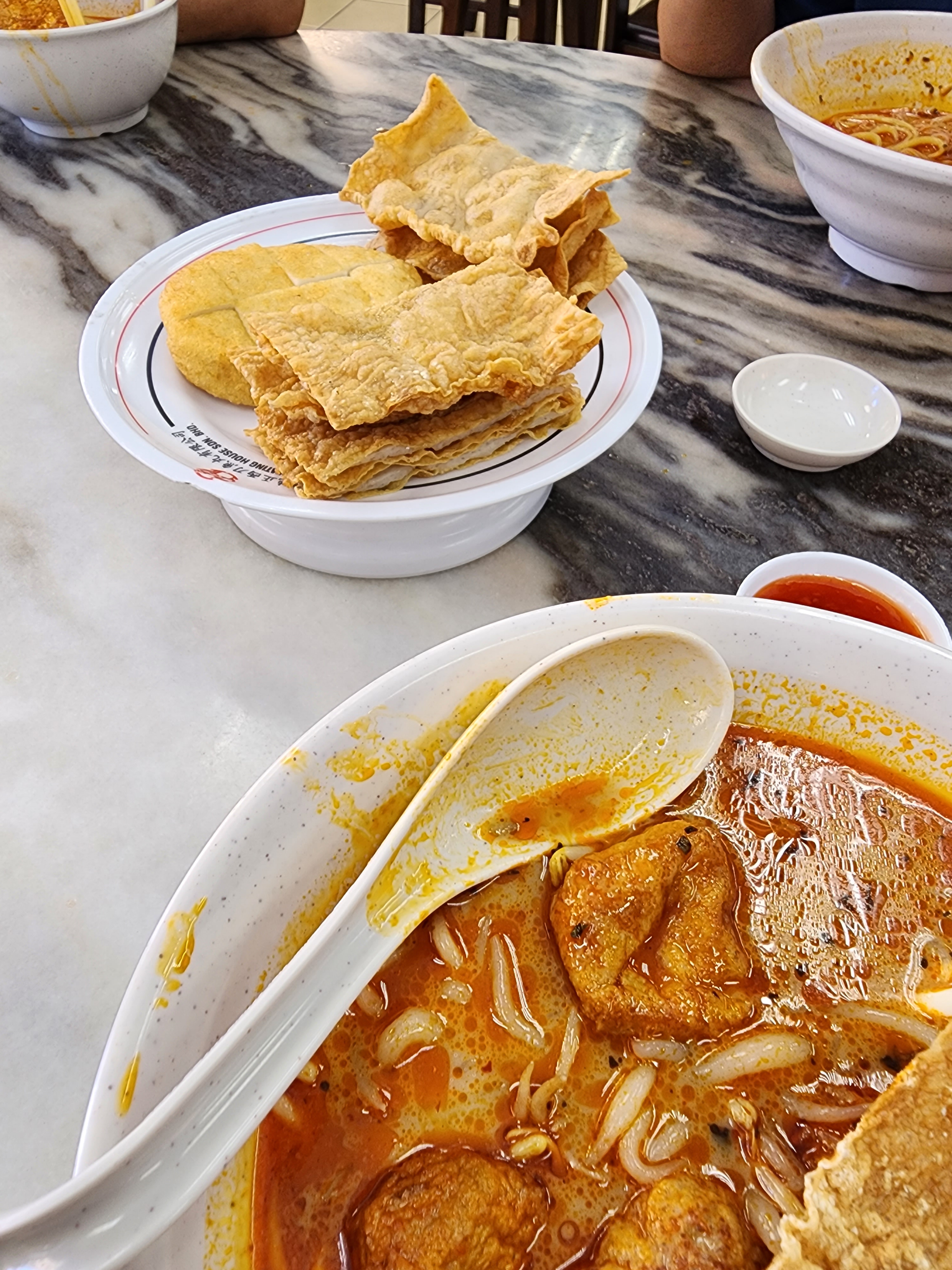
A bowl of curry mee, with fried beancurd skins and fish cake on the side

- Bak Kut Teh (pork ribs soup). The root meaning for the dish, "Bak Kut" (Hokkien dialect) is the term for meaty ribs, at its simplest cooked with garlic, dark soy sauce and a specific combination of herbs and spices which have been boiled for many hours. Popularly regarded as a health tonic, this soup is historically eaten by hard working Chinese coolies working on the wharfs at Port Swettenham (now Port Klang) and clearing estates, accompaniment with strong tea ("Teh") on the side. There are some differences in seasoning amongst other Chinese communities; the Teochew prefer a clear broth which is heavier on garlic and pepper, while the Cantonese may include additional varieties of medicinal herbs and spices. Variations include the so-called chik kut teh (made with chicken and a version that is gaining popularity with Muslim diners), seafood bak kut teh, and a "dry" (reduced gravy) version which originated from the town of Klang.
- Bakkwa, literally "dried meat", bakkwa is better understood as barbecued meat jerky. While this delicacy is especially popular during the Chinese New Year celebration period, it is available everywhere and eaten year round as a popular snack.
- Bean sprouts chicken, Ipoh's most well known dish, bean sprouts chicken consists of poached or steamed chicken accompanied with a plate of blanched locally grown bean sprouts in a simple dressing of soy sauce and sesame oil. The crunchy and stout texture of Ipoh-grown bean sprouts is attributed to the mineral-rich properties of local water supplies. The dish is usually served with hor fun noodles in a chicken broth, or plain rice.
- Cantonese fried noodles refers to a preparation of noodles which are shallow or deep fried to a crisp texture, then served as the base for a thick egg and cornstarch white sauce cooked with sliced lean pork, seafood, and green vegetables like choy sum. A variation called yuen yong involves mixing both crisp-fried rice vermicelli as well as hor fun to form a base for the sauce. A related dish called wa tan hor uses hor fun noodles, but the noodles are not deep fried, merely charred.
- Chai tow kway, a common dish in Malaysia made of rice flour. It also known as fried radish cake, although no radish is included within the rice cakes, save perhaps the occasional addition of preserved radish during the cooking process. Seasonings and additives vary from region, and may include bean sprouts and eggs.

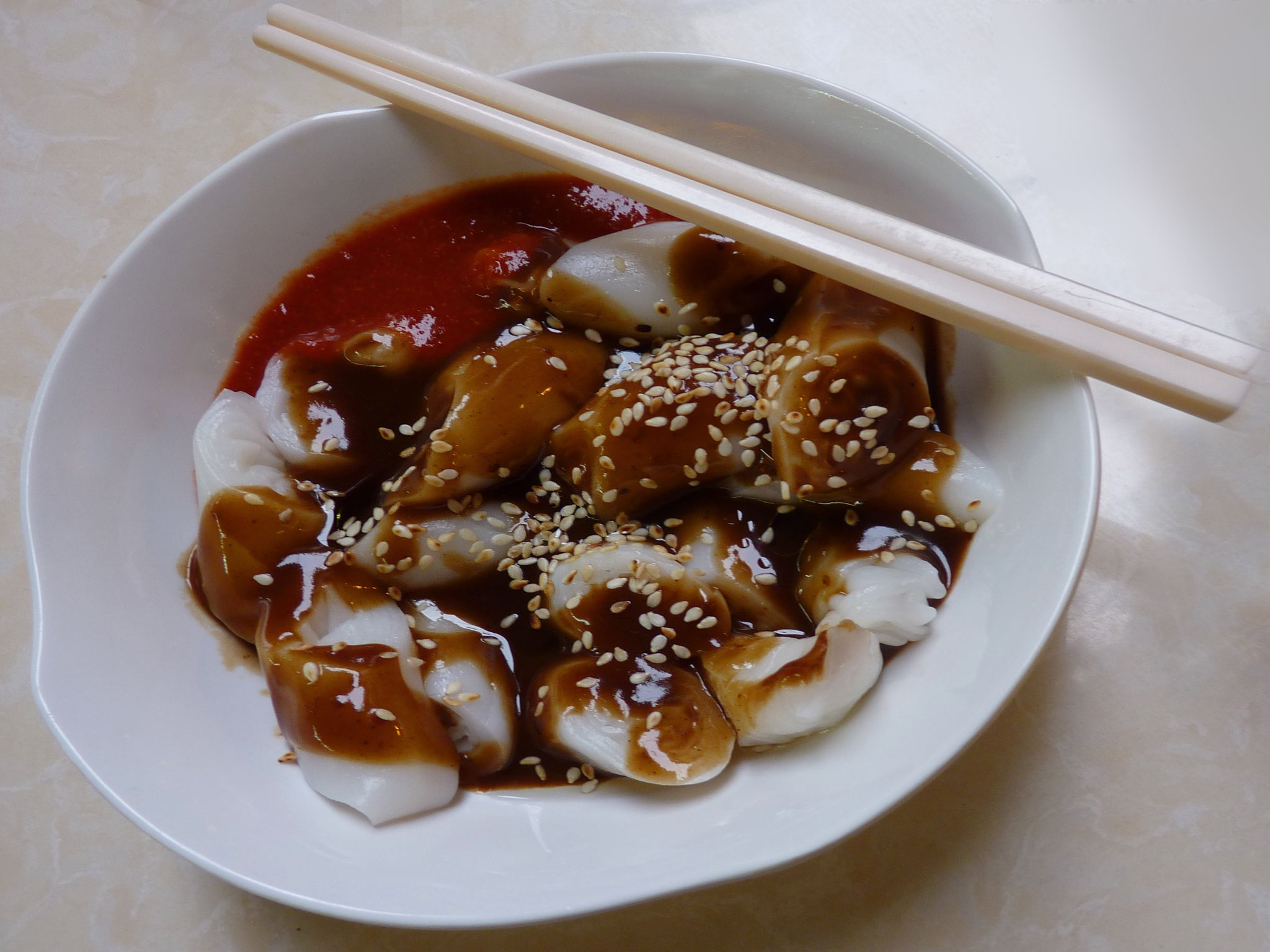
Penang chee cheong fun

- Char kway teow, Stir fried rice noodles with bean sprouts, prawns, eggs (duck or chicken), chives and thin slices of preserved Chinese sausages. Cockles and lardons were once standard offerings, but mostly relegated to optional additions these days due to changing taste preferences and growing health concerns. Penang-style char kway teow is the most highly regarded variant both in Malaysia as well as abroad.
- Chee cheong fun, is square rice sheets made from a viscous mixture of rice flour and water. This liquid is poured onto a specially made flat pan in which it is steamed to produce the square rice sheets. The steamed rice sheets is rolled or folded for ease in serving. It is usually served with tofu stuffed with fish paste. The dish is eaten with accompaniment of semi sweet fermented bean paste sauce, chilli paste or light vegetable curry gravy. Ipoh and Penang have different variants of the dish as well; certain stalls in Ipoh serve the dish with a red sweet sauce, thinly sliced pickled green chillies and fried shallots, whilst in Penang, a type of sweet, black shrimp sauce called hae ko is the main condiment.
- Cheong Cheng style steamed fish, Cheong cheng literally mean gravy or sauce steamed. The main ingredients for the gravy or sauce are fermented bean paste and chillies.

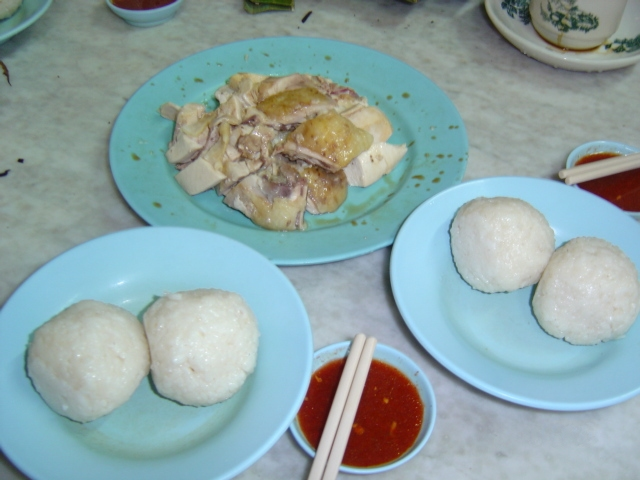
Hainanese chicken rice balls in Muar, Johor, Malaysia

- Chicken rice is one of the most popular Chinese-inspired dishes in Malaysia. Hainanese chicken rice is the best known version: it is prepared with the same traditional method used for cooking Wenchang chicken, which involve steeping the entire chicken at sub-boiling temperatures within a master stock until cooked, to ensure the chicken meat becomes moist and tender. The chicken is then chopped up, and served with a bowl or plate of rice cooked in chicken fat and chicken stock, along with another bowl of clear chicken broth and a set of dips and condiments. Sometimes the chicken is dipped in ice to produce a jelly-like skin finishing upon the completion of the poaching process. In Malacca, the chicken rice is served shaped into balls.
- Curry Mee (A bowl of thin yellow noodles mixed with bihun in a spicy curry soup enriched with coconut milk, and topped with tofu puffs, prawns, cuttlefish, chicken, long beans, cockles and mint leaves, with sambal served on the side. It is often referred to as curry laksa.
  - White Curry Mee, however the soup base is in white colour instead of yellow or red. The white color comes from the Coconut gravy)
- Fish ball are fish paste shaped into a spherical shape. Usually fish ball is served as a condiment together with rice vermicelli or yellow noodles in a clear soup base. Bean sprouts and spring onions are also commonly added, complemented by a small plate of chilli padi soaked in soy sauce. Fishcake is also a common addition
- Fish head bihun, A noodle soup in which the main ingredients are rice vermicelli and a deep fried fish head cut into chunks. The soup itself is somewhat creamy, which is usually achieved using a mixture of rich fish stock and milk. Tomatoes and pickled vegetables are sometimes added to cut the richness and provide a tangy foil for the noodle soup.
- Hakka mee, Hakka Mee is a simple dish of noodles topped with a ground meat gravy. A popular hawker dish with Hakka cultural roots, it is based on an older recipe called Dabumian; the name indicates its place of origin as Dabu County, the center of Hakka culture in mainland China.
- Heong Peng, these fragrant pastries, which resemble slightly flattened balls, are a famed speciality of Ipoh which are now widely available in Malaysia and are even exported overseas. It contains a sweet sticky filling made from malt and shallots, covered by a flaky baked crust and garnished with sesame seeds on the surface.

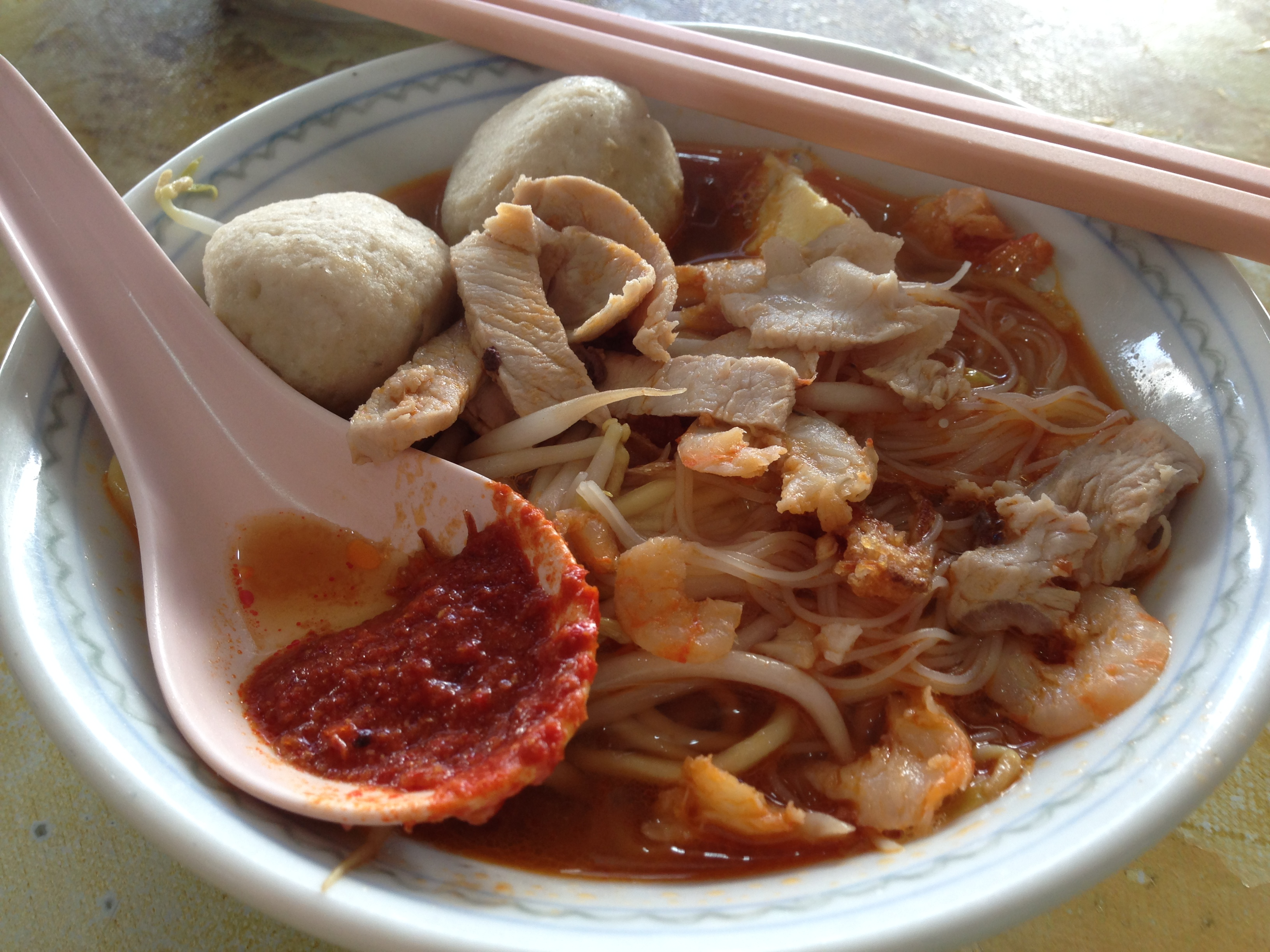
A bowl of Penang Hokkien mee

- Hokkien Mee, actually has two variants, with each being ubiquitous to a particular region of Peninsular Malaysia.
  - Penang Hokkien mee, colloquially referred to in Penang as Hokkien mee, is also known as hae mee elsewhere in Malaysia. One of Penang's most famous specialties, it is a noodle soup with yellow and rice noodles immersed in an aromatic stock made from prawns and pork (chicken for halal versions), and garnished with a boiled egg, poached prawns, chopped kangkung and a dollop of spicy sambal.
  - Hokkien char mee, a dish of thick yellow noodles braised, fried with thick black soy sauce and added with crispy lardons, is more commonly served in the Klang Valley. It was originally developed in Kuala Lumpur. Thus, within the central region of Peninsular Malaysia, the term Hokkien mee refers to this particular version.
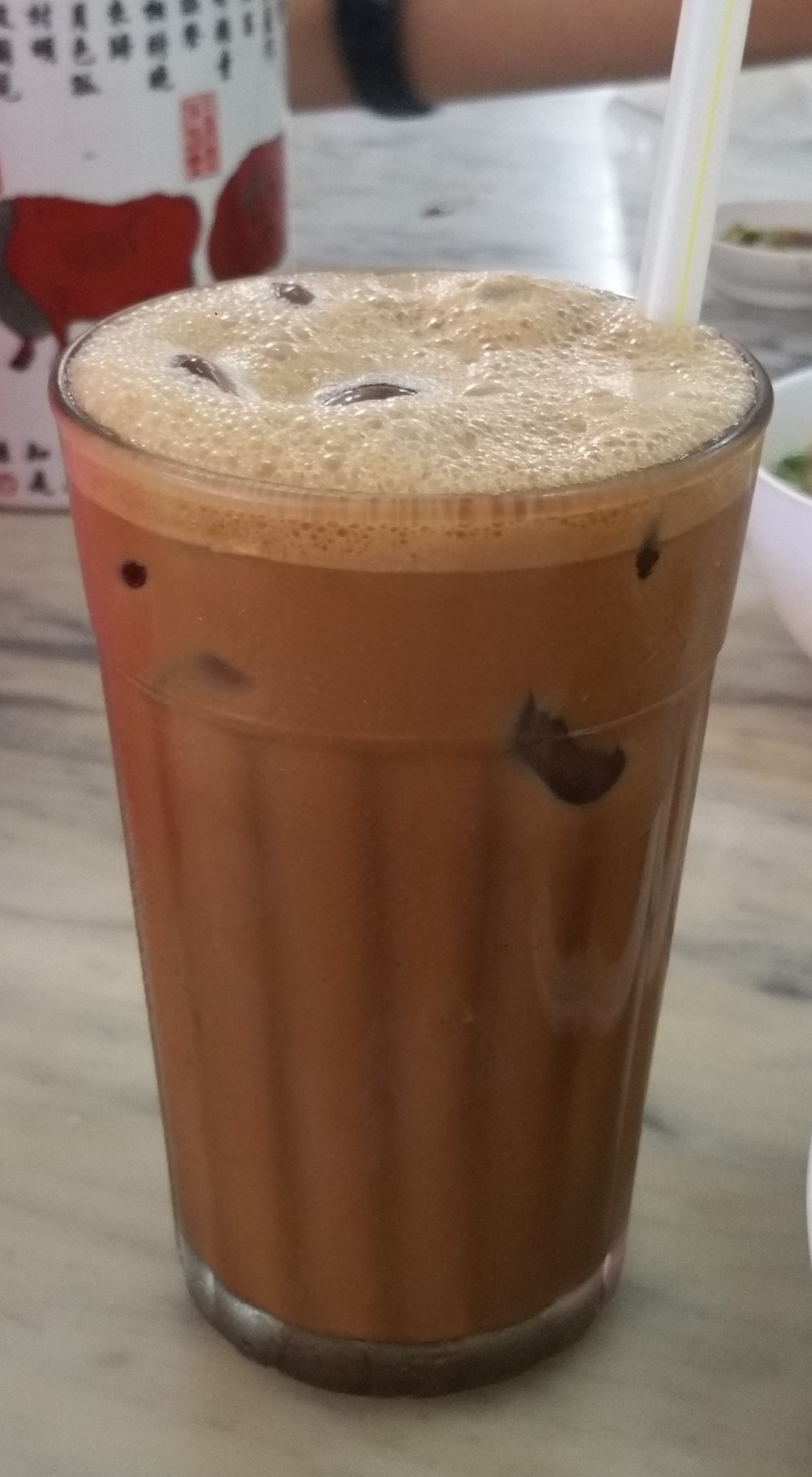
- Iced Ipoh white coffee in Menglembu, Ipoh, Malaysia
  Ipoh white coffee, A popular coffee drink which originated in Ipoh. Unlike the robust dark roast used for typical Malaysian-style black coffee ("Kopi-O"), "white" coffee is produced with only palm oil margarine and without any sugar and wheat, resulting in a significantly lighter roast. It is typically enriched with condensed milk prior to serving. This drink inspired the OldTown White Coffee restaurant chain, and instant beverage versions are widely available throughout Malaysia and even in international markets.
- Kam Heong, literally "golden fragrance" in English, Kam Heong is a method of cooking developed in Malaysia, and is a good example of the country's culinary style of mixing cultures. The tempering of aromatics with bird's eye chillies, curry leaves, crushed dried shrimp, curry powder, oyster sauce and various other seasonings yields a versatile stir-fry sauce that goes well with chicken, clams, crabs, prawns, and squid.
- Kway chap, Teochew dish of rice noodle sheets in a dark soy sauce gravy, served with pork pieces, pig offal, tofu products and boiled eggs.

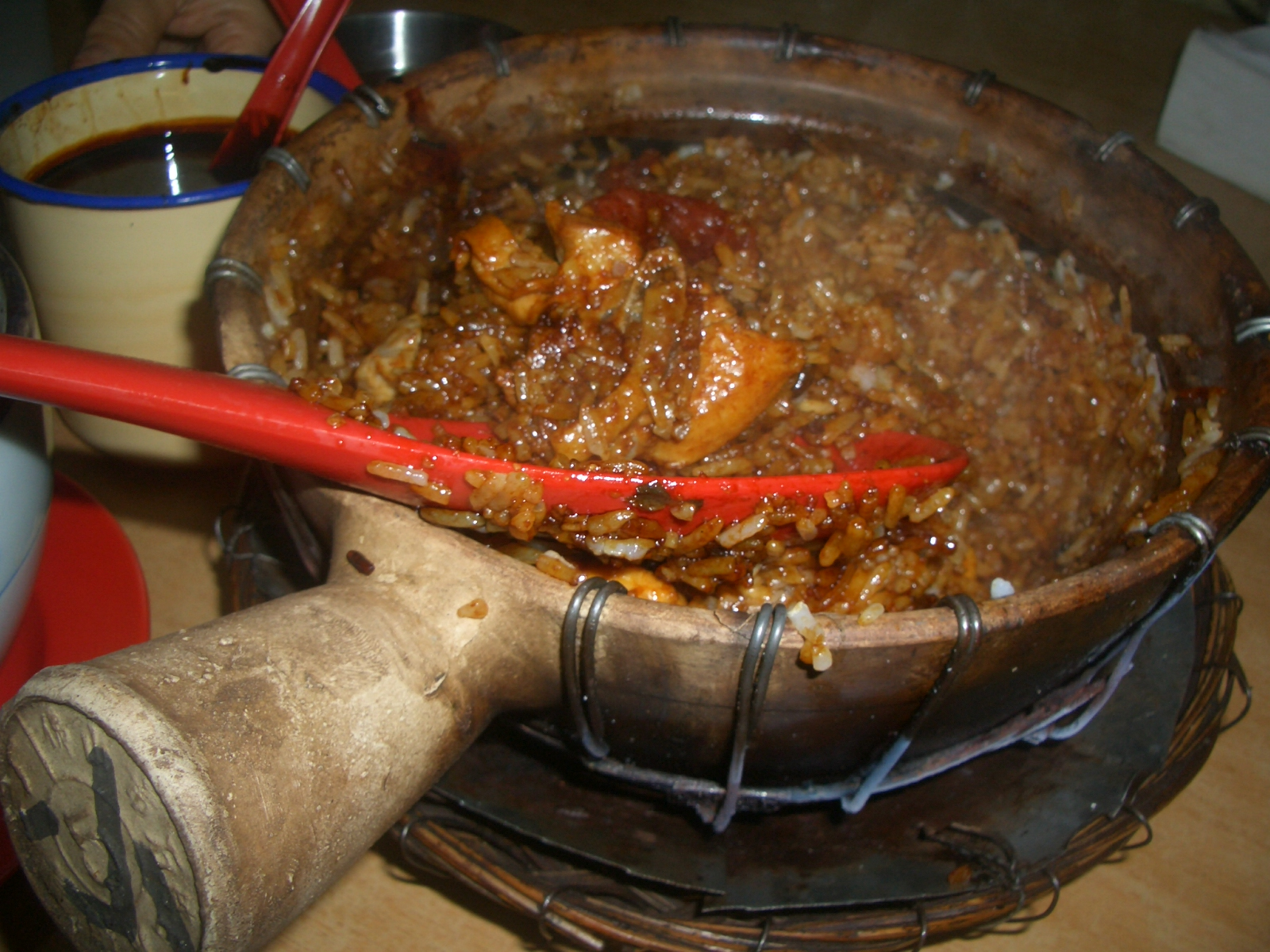
Claypot chicken rice

- Lor mee, A bowl of thick yellow noodles served in a thickened gravy made from eggs, starch and pork stock.
- Marmite chicken, a unique dish of marinated fried chicken pieces glazed in a syrupy sauce made from marmite, soy sauce, maltose and honey. This dish may also be prepared with other ingredients like pork ribs and prawns.
- Ngah Po Fan or Sha Po Fan, seasoned rice cooked in a claypot with secondary ingredients, and finished with soy sauce. A typical example is rice cooked with chicken, Chinese sausage, and vegetables. Claypots are also used for braising noodles, meat dishes and reducing soups. One of the most famous and common one is:
  - Claypot chicken rice, chicken rice served in a claypot, traditionally cooked with charcoal. Typical additions include salted fish and lap cheong. Bercham, a suburb in Ipoh is famous for claypot chicken rice.
- Ngo hiang or lor bak, a fried meat roll made from spiced minced pork and chopped water chestnuts rolled up in soy bean curd sheets, and deep fried. It is usually served with small bowl of Lor (a thick broth thickened with corn starch and beaten eggs) and chilli sauce. The term also extends to other items sold alongside the meat rolls, like tao kwa (hard tofu), pork sausages, tofu skin sheets etc.

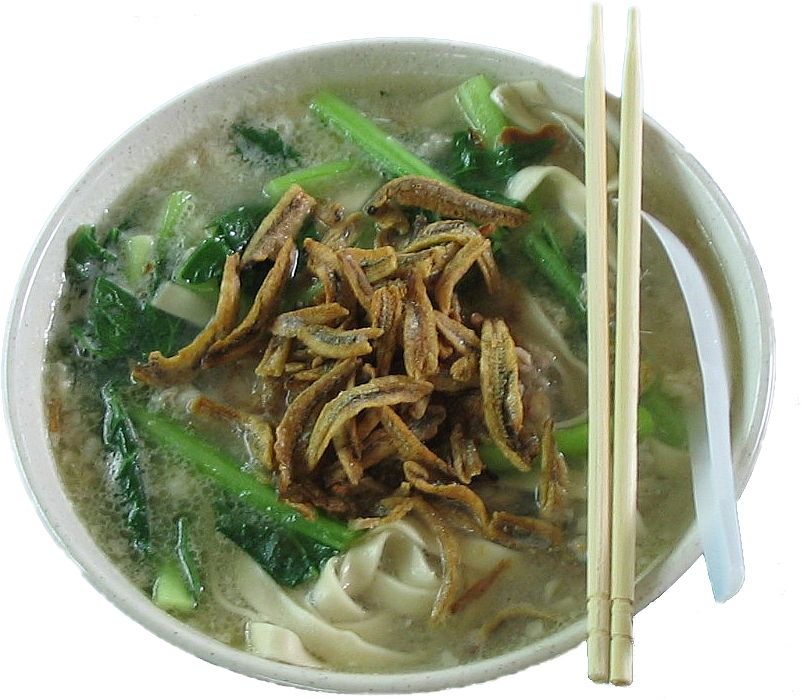
Pan Mee

- Oyster omelette or O-chian, a medley of small oysters is sauteed on a hot plate before being folded into an egg batter, which then has moistened starch mixed in for thickening, and finally fried to a crisp finish. Unlike other versions of oyster omelettes found throughout the Hokkien and Teochew diaspora, a thick savoury gravy is never poured onto Malaysian-style oyster omelettes; a chilli sauce is provided on the side for dipping instead.
- Pan mee, noodle soup with hand-kneaded and torn pieces of noodles or regular strips of machine-pressed noodles, with a toothsome texture not unlike Italian pasta. A variant popular in the Klang Valley is known as "Chilli Pan Mee", and which of cooked noodles served with minced pork, a poached egg, fried anchovies and fried chilli flakes which are added to taste. Chilli Pan Mee is accompanied with a bowl of clear soup with leafy vegetables.

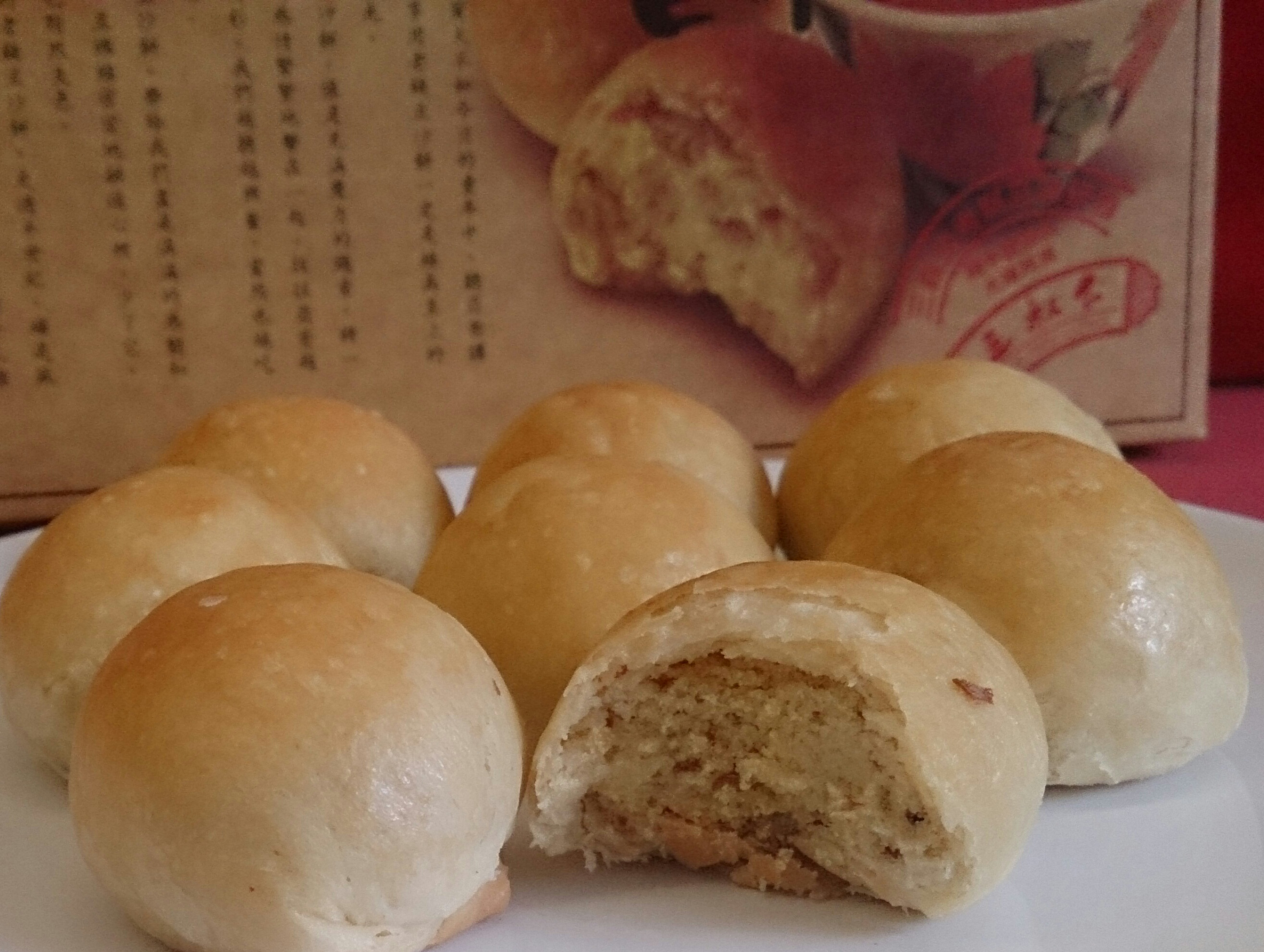
Tau sar pneah, also known as Tambun pneah, from Penang

- Popiah, Hokkien/Teochew-style crepe stuffed and rolled up with cooked shredded tofu and vegetables like turnip and carrots. The Peranakan version contains julienned bangkuang (jicama) and bamboo shoots, and the filling is seasoned with tauchu (fermented soybean paste) and meat stock. Another variation consists of popiah doused in a spicy sauce. Popiah can also be deep fried and served in a manner similar to the mainstream Chinese spring roll.
- Tau sar pneah, A famous Penang delicacy, this round-shaped Chinese pastry contains primarily green bean paste, and its ingredients include wheat flour, sugar and salt. It is also known as Tambun biscuits as it was widely believed that the pastry originated from Bukit Tambun, Penang. Its popularity as a delicacy has made this pastry one of the must-buy souvenirs from Penang.

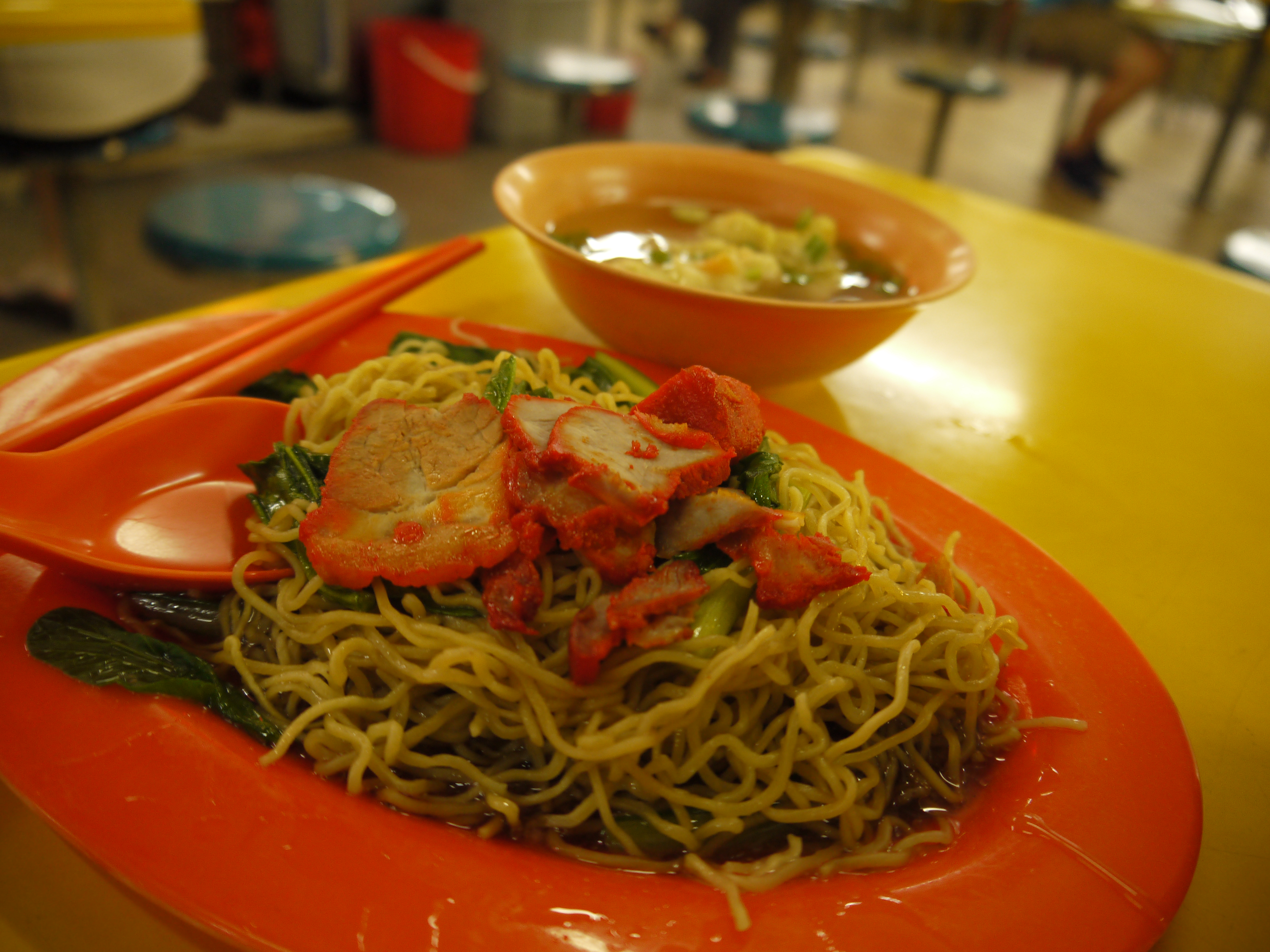
Wonton Mee

- Wonton Mee, thin egg noodles with wonton dumplings, choy sum and char siu. The dumplings are usually made of pork or prawns, and typically boiled or deep fried. The noodles may be served in a bowl of broth with dumplings as in the traditional Cantonese manner, but in Malaysia it is more commonly dressed with a dark soy sauce dressing, with boiled or deep-fried wonton dumplings as a topping or served on the side in a bowl of broth. Variations of this dish are usually in the meat accompaniments with the noodles. These may include roast pork, braised chicken feet, and roast duck
- Yau Zha Gwai or Eu Char Kway or You Tiao, a version of the traditional Chinese crueller, which is a breakfast favourite. It can be eaten plain with a beverage like coffee and soy milk, spread with butter or kaya, or dipped into congee. It is shaped like a pair of chopsticks, stuck together.
- Yong tau foo, tofu products and vegetables like brinjals, lady's fingers, bitter gourd and chillies stuffed with fish paste or surimi. Originally developed in Ampang, Selangor, Malaysian yong tau foo is a localised adaptation of a Hakka dish called ngiong tew foo (stuffed tofu with ground pork paste) and is usually served in a clear broth, with or without noodles.

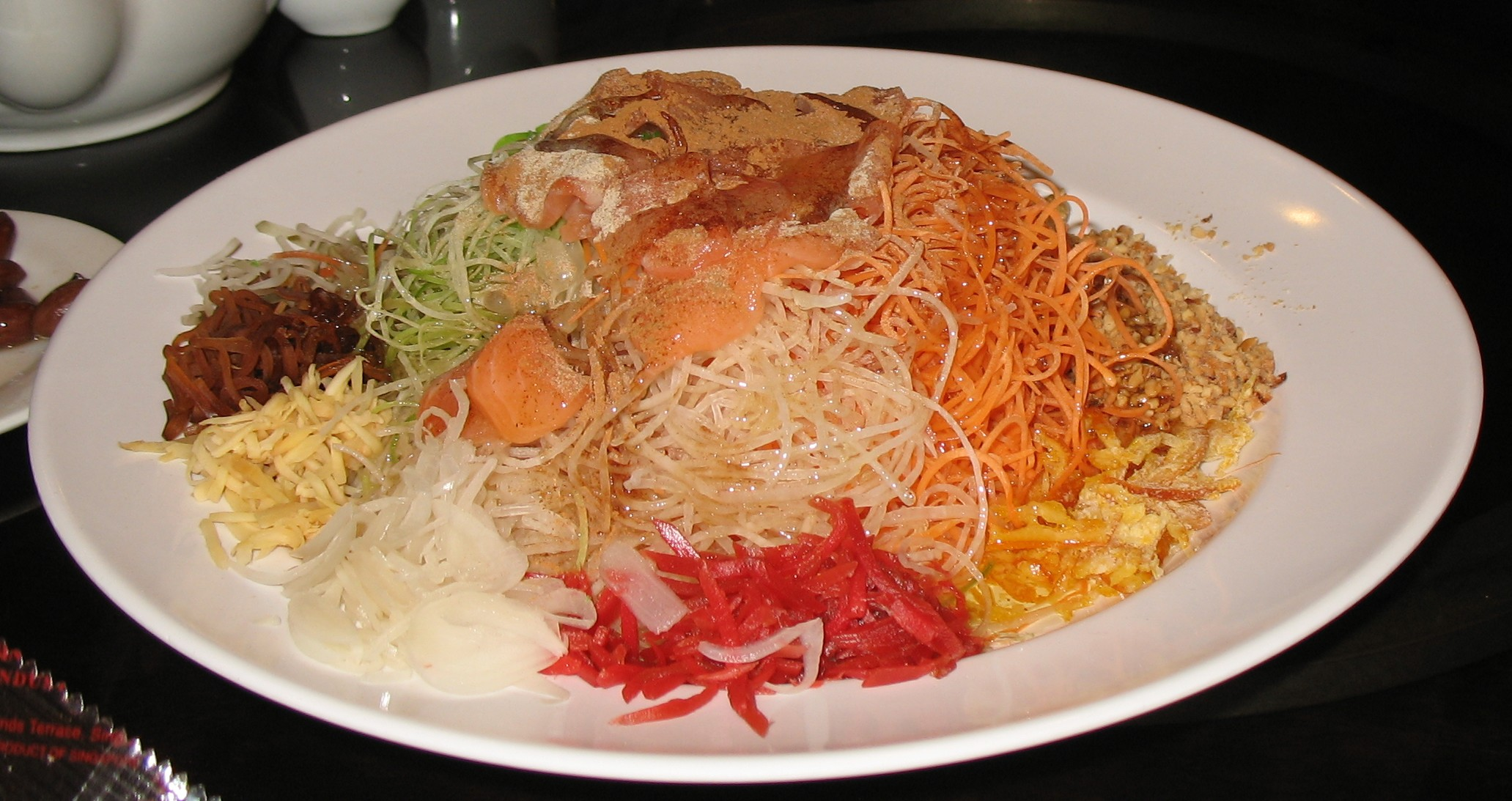
Yusheng

- Yusheng, a festive raw fish salad, also pronounced yee sang in the Cantonese manner. While raw fish preparations are thought to have existed in China during antiquity and can be found in the Chaoshan region of Guangdong province in modern times, yusheng was developed by Loke Ching Fatt, who at the time owned Loke Ching Kee, a Chinese restaurant in the city of Seremban. It consists of strips of raw fish tossed at the dining table with shredded vegetables, crispy tidbits and a combination of sauces and condiments. Yusheng literally means "raw fish" but since "fish " is commonly conflated with its homophone "abundance, Yúshēng is interpreted as a homophone for Yúshēng meaning an increase in abundance. Therefore, yusheng is considered a symbol of abundance, prosperity and vigor. As a result, the mixing and tossing of yusheng with chopsticks and the subsequent consumption of the salad has become ritualised as part of the commemoration of Chinese New Year festivities in Malaysia and Singapore.
- Zongzi, a traditional Chinese food made of glutinous rice stuffed with savoury or sweet fillings and wrapped in bamboo, reed, or other large flat leaves. They are cooked by steaming or boiling, and are a feature of the Duanwu festival, which is still celebrated by the Chinese communities in Malaysia.
- Lei Cha, This aromatic drink is a Hakka staple. The recipe differs from household to household, but generally green tea leaves are added to a mixture of salt, ground mint leaves, toasted sesame seeds and nuts. The mixture is ground or pounded into a fine powder, then brewed into a drink. Taste salty, minty, and full of nutrition.
- Gong Pian or Kom Piang, This is a type of clay oven-baked biscuit/bagel associated with the Fuzhounese settlers brought in by the British. Unlike the more common clan communities brought in, the Fuzhounese settlers were brought in smaller numbers predominantly settling in Sitiawan, Perak and Sibu, Sarawak. The Gong Pians out of Sitiawan are generally sweet, but the Gong Pians in Sitiawan are salty. It is usually filled with pork, lard or onions and is best eaten while still hot and crispy. Fuzhou cuisine is unique in its own, different from the other more common Chinese clan communities. It is uncommon and can only be found mainly in Sitiawan and Sibu.

=== Malaysian Indian cuisine ===
Malaysian Indian cuisine, or the cooking of the ethnic Indian communities in Malaysia consists of adaptations of authentic dishes from India, as well as original creations inspired by the diverse food culture of Malaysia. As the vast majority of Malaysia's Indian community are mostly ethnic Tamils who are descendants of the modern Indian state of Tamil Nadu and Sri Lanka's Northern Province, much of Malaysian Indian cuisine is predominantly South Indian inspired in character and taste. A typical Malaysian Indian dish is likely to be redolent with curry leaves, whole and powdered spice, and contains fresh coconut in various forms. Ghee is still widely used for cooking, although vegetable oils and refined palm oils are now commonplace in home kitchens. Before a meal it is customary to wash hands as cutlery is often not used while eating, with the exception of a serving spoon for each respective dish.

Food served in the traditional South Indian manner is termed banana leaf rice. Plain white or parboiled rice would be served with an assortment of vegetable preparations, lentil gravy, pickles, condiments, and papadum crackers on a banana leaf, which acts as a disposable plate. Banana leaf meals are eaten to celebrate special occasions such as festivals, birthdays, marriages, or to commemorate funeral wakes. It is customary to consume banana leaf meals by hand and to show appreciation for the food by folding the banana leaf inwards, though less ritual and etiquette is observed when the meal isn't part of a formal occasion, such as the Malayalee community's elaborate Sadya feasts. Boiled eggs, meat or seafood dishes are available at banana leaf restaurants which are not exclusively vegetarian or vegan.

Some notable Malaysian Indian dishes include:

- Satti Sorru, Indian claypot rice
- Chapati, a North Indian style flatbread. It is made from a dough of atta flour (whole grain durum wheat), water and salt by rolling the dough out into discs of approximately twelve centimetres in diameter and browning the discs on both sides on a very hot, dry tava or frying pan without any oil. Chapatis are usually eaten with curried vegetables. and pieces of the chapati are used to wrap around and pick up each bite of the cooked dish.
- Fish head curry, a dish where the head of a fish (usually ikan merah, or literally "red fish"), is braised in a thick and spicy curried gravy with assorted vegetables such as lady's fingers and brinjals.

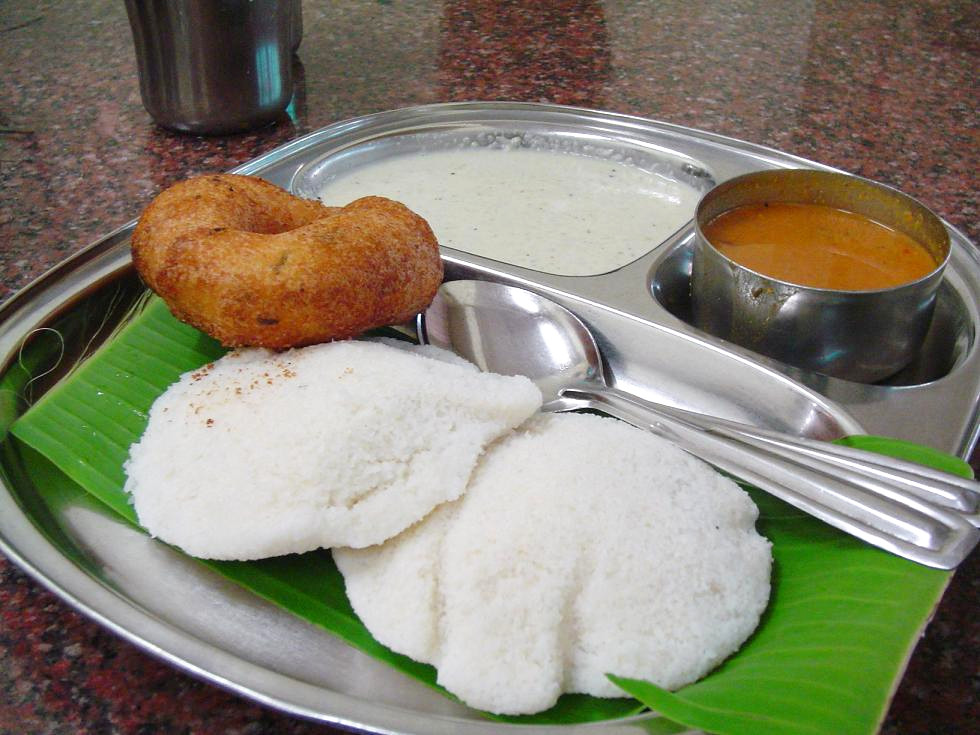
Idli served with typical accompaniments.

- Fish molee, originally from the Indian state of Kerala, this preparation of fish in a spiced coconut milk gravy is perhaps the Malaysian Malayalee community's best known dish.
- Idli, made from a mashed mixture of skinned black lentils and rice formed into patties using a mould and steamed, idlis are eaten at breakfast or as a snack. Idlis are usually served in pairs with vadai, small donut-shaped fritters made from mashed lentils and spices, chutney, and a thick stew of lentils and vegetables called sambar.
- Lassi, a yogurt-based drink which comes in savoury and sweet varieties. A common drink of Tamil origin which is similar to lassi but is thinner in consistency is called moru. It is seasoned with salt with flavoured with spices like asafoetida, curry leaves and mustard seeds.

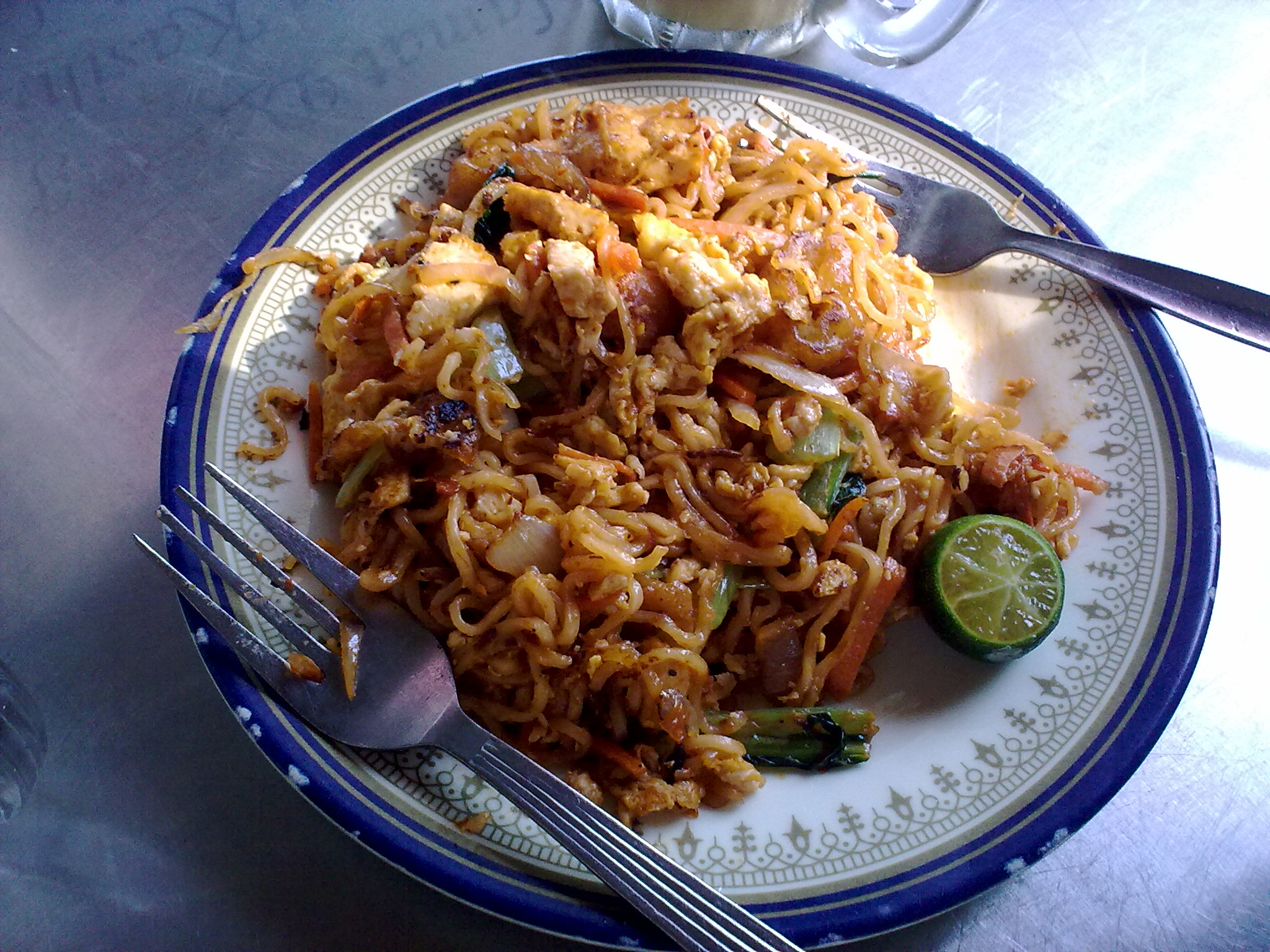
Maggi goreng in George Town, Penang

- Maggi goreng, a unique Mamak-style variant of mee goreng or stir-fried noodles, using reconstituted Maggi instant noodles instead of yellow egg noodles. The noodles may be wok-tossed with bean sprouts, chilli, greens, eggs, tofu, and meat of choice, although no recipe at any Mamak eatery are ever the same. It is usually accompanied with a calamansi lime.

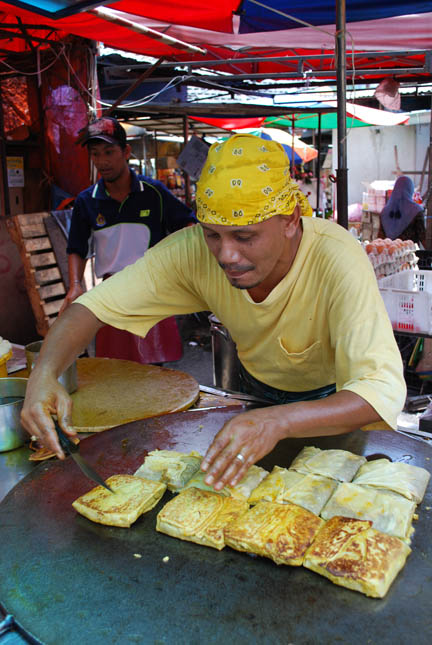
Murtabak being made at a stall, a type of pancake filled with eggs, small chunks of meat and onions.

- Murtabak, a savoury dish of stuffed roti canai or flatbread eaten with curry gravy. A typical recipe consists of a minced meat mixture seasoned with garlic, onions and spices folded with an omelette and roti canai. Murtabak is popularly eaten with a side of sweet pickled onions during the fasting month of Ramadan.
- Murukku, a savoury snack of spiced crunchy twists made from rice and urad dal flour, traditionally eaten for Deepavali.
- Nasi Beriani or Biryani, a rice dish made from a mixture of spices, basmati rice, yoghurt, meat or vegetables. The ingredients are ideally cooked together in the final phase and is time-consuming to prepare. Pre-mixed biryani spices from different commercial names are easily available in markets these days, which is meant to reduce preparation time.

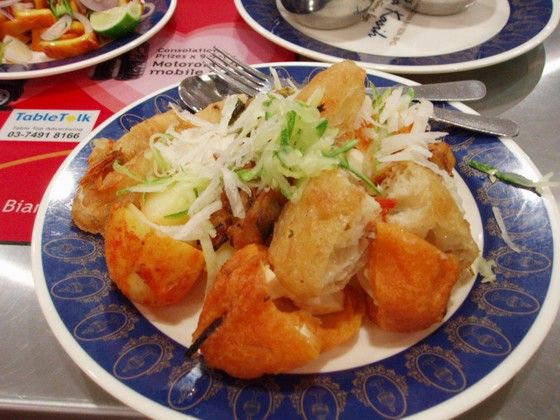
Pasembur.

- Pachadi, a traditional South Indian side accompaniment or relish made with vegetables, fruits or lentils. The Malaysian Telugu community celebrate the Telugu New Year or Ugadi by preparing a special dish called Ugadi Pachadi, which blends six taste notes as a symbolic reminder of the various facets of life. It is made with green chilli (heat), unripe mangoes (tangy), neem flowers (bitter), jaggery (sweet), tamarind juice (sour) and salt.
- Pasembur, a salad of shredded cucumber, boiled potatoes, fried bean curd, turnip, bean sprouts, prawn fritters, spicy fried crab, and fried octopus. This Penang Mamak speciality is served with a sweet and spicy nut sauce, and variants of this dish are found in other states as Mamak rojak.
- Pongal, a boiled rice dish which comes in sweet and spicy varieties. It shares the same name as the harvest festival which is celebrated every January; the name of the festival itself is derived from this dish. The sweet variety of pongal, prepared with milk and jaggery, is cooked in the morning. Once the pongal pot has boiled over (symbolism for an abundant harvest), it is then offered as a prasad to the gods as thanksgiving.
- Poori, an unleavened deep-fried bread made with whole-wheat flour, commonly consumed for breakfast or as a light meal. A larger North Indian variant made with leavened all-purpose flour or maida is called bhatura.
- Puttu, a speciality of the Sri Lankan Tamil community, puttu is a steamed cylinder of ground rice layered with coconut. It is eaten with bananas, brown sugar, and side dishes like vendhaya kolumbu (tamarind stew flavoured with fenugreek seeds and lentils) or kuttu sambal (relish made from pounded coconut, onions, chilli and spices).
- Putu Mayam, the Indian equivalent of rice noodles, also known as idiyappam. Homemade versions tend to be eaten as an accompaniment to curried dishes or dal. The street food version is typically served with grated coconut and orange-coloured jaggery. In some areas, gula melaka is the favoured sweetener.

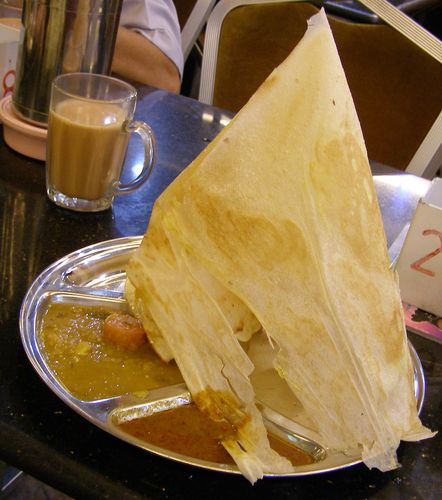
Roti tisu served as a savoury meal, pictured here with a glass of teh tarik.

- Roti canai, a thin unleavened bread with a flaky crust, fried on a skillet with oil and served with condiments. It is sometimes referred to as roti kosong. A host of variations on this classic dish may be found at all Mamak eateries, either at the creative whim of the cook or by customers' special request. A few examples include: roti telur (fried with eggs), roti bawang (fried with thinly sliced onions), roti bom (a smaller but denser roti, usually round in shape), roti pisang (banana), and so on.
- Roti tissue, a variant of roti canai made as thin as a piece of 40–50 cm round-shaped tissue in density. It is then carefully folded by the cook into a tall, conical shape and left to stand upright. Roti tissue may be served with curry gravy, dal and chutneys, or finished off with sweet substances such as caramelised sugar and eaten as a dessert.
- Teh tarik, literally meaning "pulled tea", teh tarik is a well-loved Malaysian drink. Tea is sweetened using condensed milk, and is prepared using outstretched hands to pour piping hot tea from a mug into a waiting glass, repetitively. The higher the "tarik" or pull, the thicker the froth. The pulling also has the effect of cooling down the tea. Teh tarik is an art form in itself and watching the tea streaming back and forth into the containers can be quite captivating. Similar drinks and variants include kopi tarik, or "pulled coffee" instead of tea; teh halia, tea brewed with ginger, and with or without the tarik treatment; and teh madras, which is prepared with three separate layers: milk at the bottom, black tea in the middle and foam at the top.
- Thosai, dosa or dosai, a soft crepe made from a batter of mashed urad dal and rice, and left to ferment overnight. The batter is spread into a thin, circular disc on a flat, preheated griddle. It may be cooked as it is for (which results in a foldable and soft crepe), or a dash of oil or ghee is then added to the thosai and toasted for crispier results.
- Vadai, vada or vades, is a common term for many different types of savoury fritter-type snacks originated from South India with a set of common ingredients. The most common ingredients are lentils, chillis, onions and curry leaves.

=== Sabahan food ===
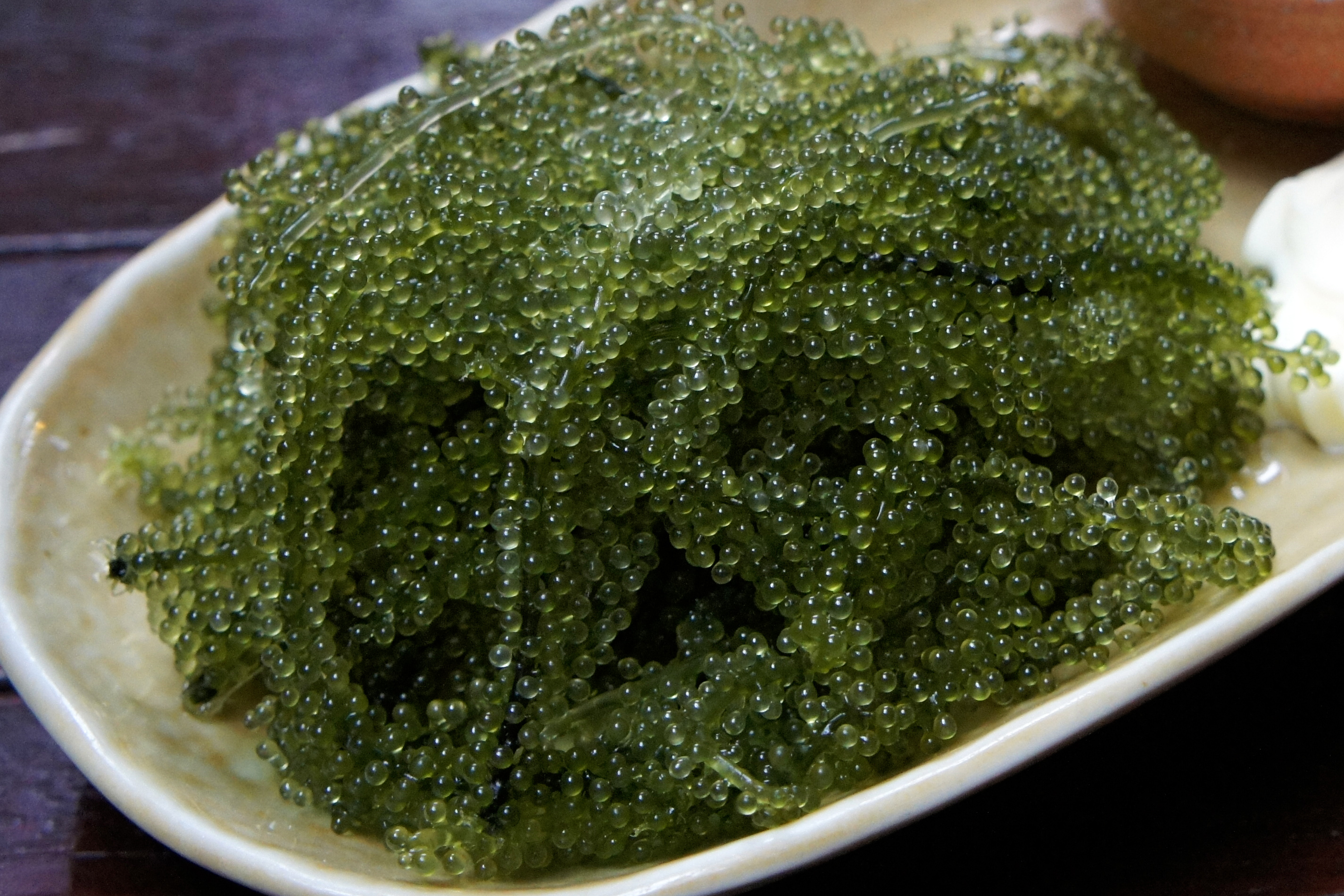
Sea grapes, known as latok by the Bajau people.

The food of Sabah reflects the ethnic diversity of its population and is very eclectic. Traditional Kadazandusun cuisine involves mostly boiling or grilling and employs little use of oil. From simple appetizers of seasoned unripe mango to a variety of pickled foods collectively known as noonsom, tangy and pungent flavours derived from souring agents or fermentation techniques is a key characteristic of traditional Kadazandusun cooking. Rice wine accompanies all Kadazandusun celebrations and rites, and at a Murut event there will be rows upon rows of jars with fermented tapioca tapai. Presently few eateries in Sabah serve traditional indigenous dishes, although it will always be found during festive occasions like weddings and funerals, as well as the Kaamatan and Kalimaran cultural festivals. Chinese-influenced dishes like northern Chinese potstickers and Hakka stuffed tofu, along with many original creations developed in Sabah's interior settlements by immigrants from both northern and southern China throughout the 20th century, feature prominently on the menus of many kopitiam establishments and upscale restaurants.

Sabah is notable for its excellent seafood, temperate produce and tea (Sabah tea has GI status) grown in the highlands of Mt. Kinabalu, and a small coffee plantation industry with Tenom coffee considered the best produce in the region. Local ingredients like freshwater fish, wild boar (bakas in native dialects), bamboo shoots, wild ferns, and various jungle produce still figure prominently in the daily diet of the local population. As a significant portion of rural communities still subsist on agriculture as their primary source of income, small scale festivals are even held each year at certain towns to celebrate produce vital to the livelihoods of the local people: the Pesta Jagung of Kota Marudu, the Pesta Rumbia (sago) of Kuala Penyu, and Pesta Kelapa from the town of Kudat. Sabah vegetable, also known as cekuk manis or sayur manis (Chinese : 树仔菜), can be found on the menus of many eateries and restaurants throughout the state of Sabah. It is one of the local terms used for a variety of Sauropus albicans developed in Lahad Datu, which yields crunchy edible shoots in addition to its leaves. The flavour is reminiscent of spinach but more complex, "as though it had been fortified with broccoli and infused with asparagus", and is typically stir-fried with eggs or seasonings like sambal belacan.

Whether grilled, cured, deep-fried, steamed, stir-fried, braised, served raw, or made into soups, Sabah's seafood is famed for its freshness, quality, and good value for money. A vast variety of fish, cephalopods, marine crustaceans, shellfish, sea cucumbers and jellyfish have become mainstays on lunch and dinner menus at kopitiam, restaurants, and humble food shacks all over Kota Kinabalu and other coastal towns like Sandakan, Tawau, Lahad Datu and Semporna. Seafood paired with noodles also figure prominently for breakfast, for each day locals flock to speciality eateries where they may be served an assortment of fish-based products to start the day. Examples include: poached patties handmade with fresh fish paste; deep-fried fish cakes wrapped in tofu skin sheets; and noodle soups with toppings like sliced fish fillet, fish or prawn balls, and fish innards. A few eateries even serve "noodles" rolled out with fresh fish paste.

Edible seaweed is a traditional food for certain seaside communities throughout Sabah and also possess GI status. Latok is similar in appearance to clusters of green-hued fish eggs or grapes, and is typically prepared as a salad by the Bajau people. Coral seaweed is another popular seaplant product; in recent times it is marketed as a gourmet health food to both locals and tourists, and is given the moniker of "sea bird's nest" (Chinese : 海底燕窝) as coral seaweed acquires a similar gelatinous texture when dissolved in water.

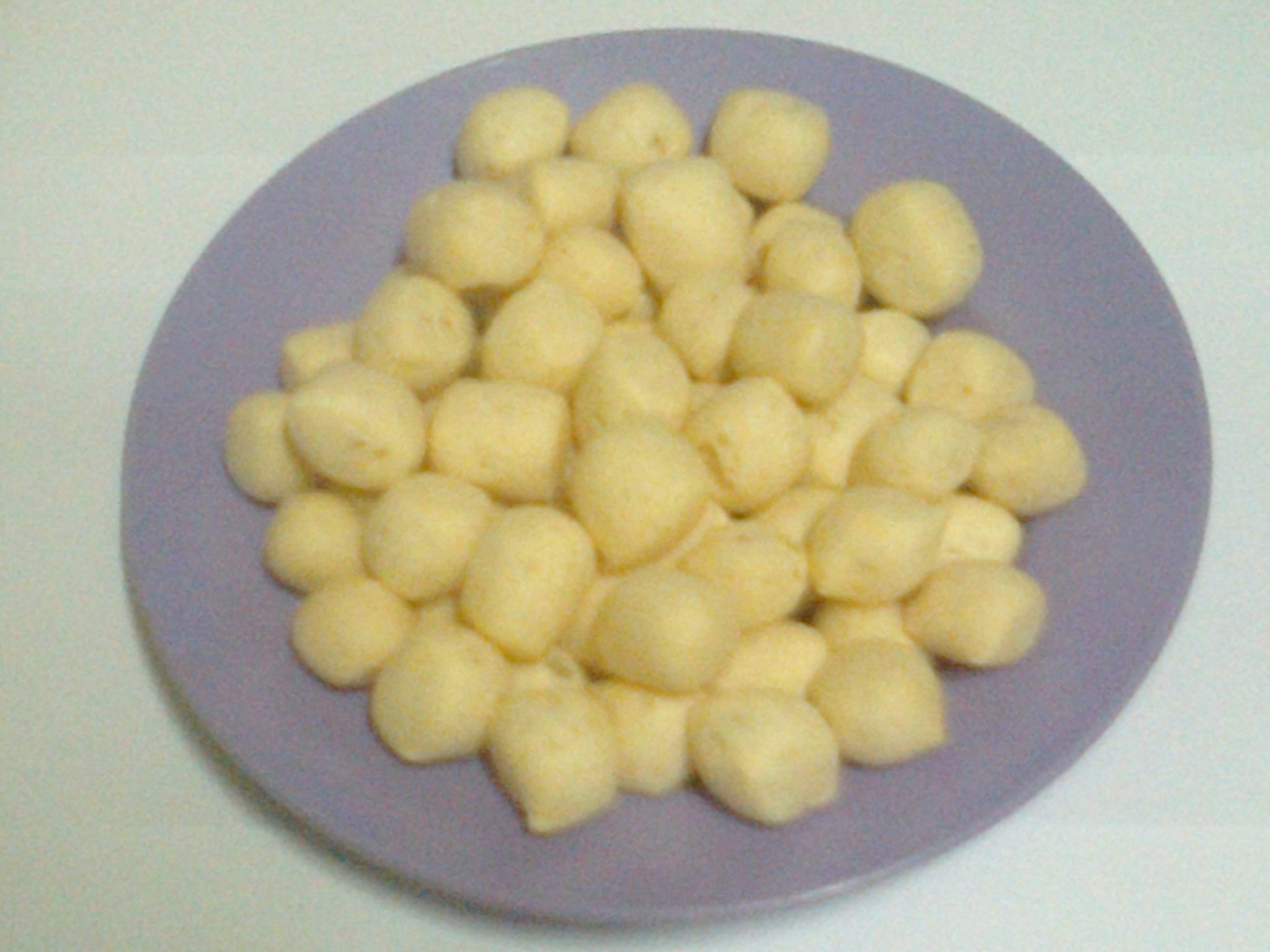
Amplang.

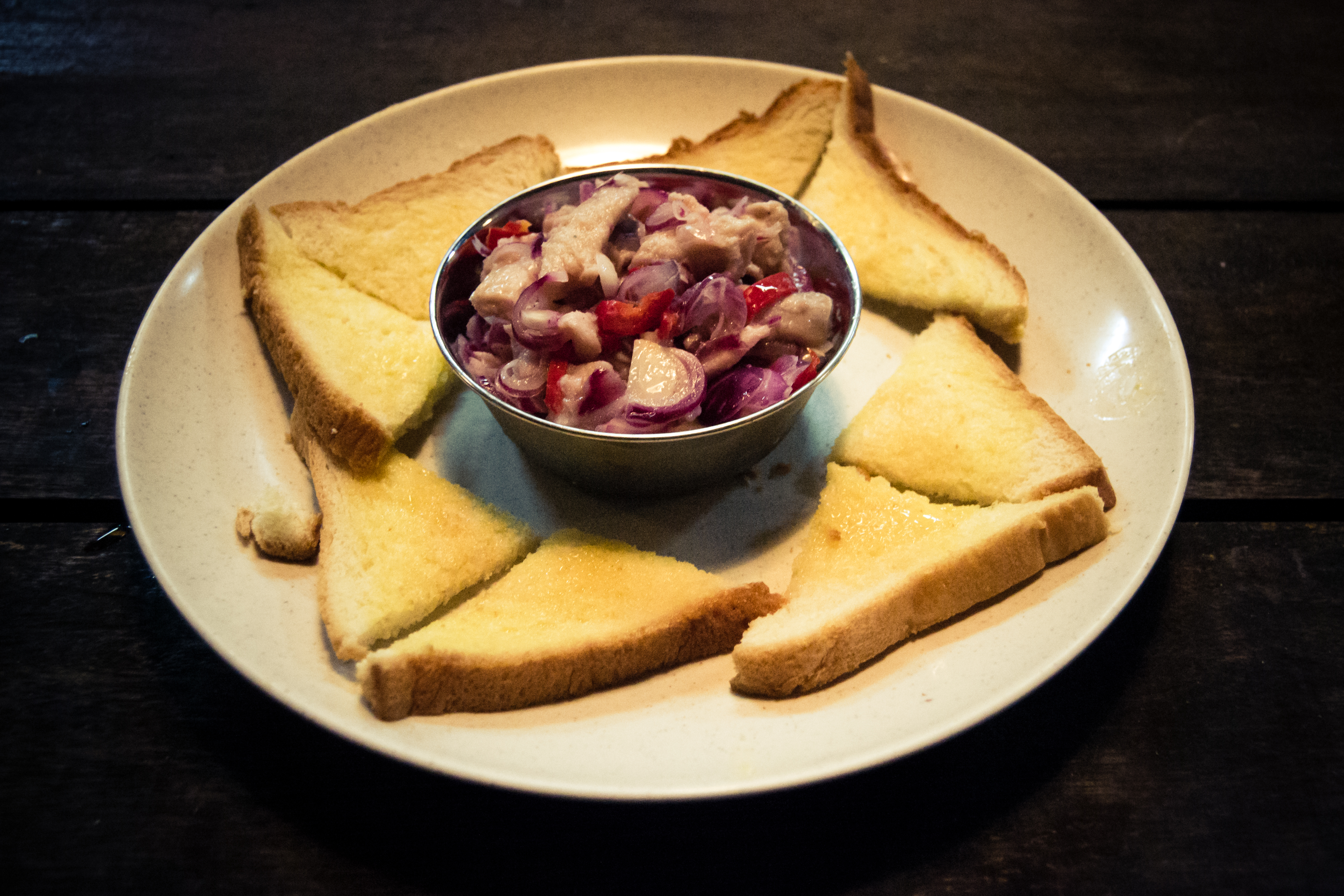
Swordfish hinava served with sandwich bread

Among the foods and beverages particular to Sabah are:

- Amplang is a type of cracker made from Spanish mackerel, tapioca starch and other seasonings, and then deep fried.
- Bahar or baa is the Kadazandusun variant of palm wine made with sap collected from the cut flower bud of a young coconut tree and a special type of tree bark called rosok, endemic to the Tuaran district. Pieces of the rosok is dipped into the coconut nectar during the fermentation process, which contributes a reddish hue to the final product.
- Beaufort Mee (Chinese: 保佛炒面) is a speciality of Beaufort town. Handmade noodles are smoked, then wok-tossed with meat (usually slices of char siu and marinated pork) or seafood and plenty of choy sum, and finished off with a thick viscous gravy.
- Bosou, also called noonsom or tonsom, is the Kadazandusun term for a traditional recipe of tangy fermented meat. Smoked and pulverised buah keluak (nuts from the Kepayang tree (Pangium edule) which grows in Malaysia's mangrove swamplands), or pangi is a key ingredient and acts as a preservative. Combined with rice, salt and fresh meat or fish, the mixture is then placed into a sealed jar or container for fermentation. Contemporary variants for bosou add bananas and pineapples to the mixture. Pinongian is a variant where rice is omitted to produce a final product which is much less tangy in taste; however, unlike bosou, "pinongian" must be cooked before serving.
- Hinava is a traditional Kadazandusun dish of raw fish cured in lime juice. Typically, firm fleshed white fish like mackerel (hinava sada tongii) is marinated with lime juice, sliced shallots, chopped chilli, julienned ginger and grated dried seed of the bambangan fruit. Optional additions may include sliced bitter gourd. Hinava may also be made with prawns (hinava gipan).
- Lihing is a rice wine made exclusively from glutinous rice and natural yeast called sasad. Bittersweet in taste profile, lihing is a speciality of the Kadazan Penampang community, where it is still commonly brewed at home. Lihing can be used to make chicken soup (Sup Manuk Lihing), used in marinades, or even as an ingredient for meat pastries and stir-fried dishes. Commercially produced lihing, much pricier than the homebrewed version but consistent in quality, is also available in select souvenir shops. Lihing and similar rice wine variants from other Kadazandusun communities may also be distilled to produce a hard liquor called montoku or talak.
- Linongot is a type of leaf parcel (usually irik or tarap leaves) filled with a combination of cooked rice and root vegetables like sweet potatoes and yam. Alternate names known by Kadazandusun communities in other districts include linopod and sinamazan.
- Nasi kombos is a rice dish from the Lotud community. Glutinous rice is first cooked with young coconut water, and then mixed with the grated tender flesh of a young coconut. The rice is traditionally served in a hollowed out coconut shell.
- Nonsoom bambangan is a pickle made from half ripe bambangan fruit mixed with grated dried bambangan seed and salt, sealed in a tightly covered jar and left to ferment for weeks.
- Ngiu chap (牛什) is a Chinese-influenced dish of beef or buffalo broth served with noodles, usually immersed in the soup with slices of poached beef or buffalo meat, meatballs, stewed brisket, tendon, liver and various offal parts. An iconic Sabahan dish, ngiu chap has many different variations, from the lighter Hainanese style to heartier Hakka-influenced flavours, and even village-style ngiu chap adapted for indigenous tastes.
- Piaren Ah Manuk is a chicken curry made from a sauteed rempah base and grated coconut, then braised in coconut milk. This dish is very popular in the Iranun community. Variants include fish (Piaren Ah Sada) and unripe jackfruit (Piaren Ah Badak).
- Nuba laya/Nuba tinga is an ordinary rice wrapped with banana leaf or nyrik leaf. This dishes is to ease the farmer and the traveller for them to carry for a long journey. Usually this dishes is very famous among the Lun Bawang/Lundayeh people and this dishes a bit similarity to the linongot. However, this Nuba Tinga/Nuba laya is different because the rice is very soft and can bitten easily by senior citizen.
- Pinasakan or Pinarasakan is a home-style Kadazandusun dish of fish simmered with takob-akob (dried skin of a mangosteen-like fruit which functions as a souring agent) or slices of unripe bambangan, as well as fresh turmeric leaves and rhizome.
- Pinjaram (or known as: Penyaram) is a Bajau and Bruneian Malay heritage. It is famous and popular almost everywhere in Sabah and can be found in night markets and tamu (Sabah weekly market).
- Sagol or sinagol is a Bajau speciality of fish which is first blanched and minced, then sauteed with turmeric, garlic, ginger, onions and crushed lemongrass. Traditionally the oil used is rendered fish liver oil, usually from the same fish used to prepare this dish. This dish may be prepared with shark, stingray and even puffer fish.
- Sang nyuk mian (Chinese : 生肉面) is a dish of noodles served with pork broth, originating from Tawau. Very popular with the non-Muslim communities of Sabah, it is named after the poached-to-order slices of tender marinated pork served in pork broth which is flavoured with fried lard bits. The noodles (usually thick yellow noodles) are either dressed in dark soy and lard, or dunked into the soup along with the aforementioned pork slices, vegetables, meatballs and offal.
- Sinalau refers to Kadazandusun style smoked meat, which is usually wild boar or bakas. Barbecued on a char grill and eaten with rice and dipping sauces, sinalau bakas can be found and purchased in rural areas and towns. Halal versions substitute wild boar for other game meats like deer.
- Sinamu Baka is a Lun Bawang/Lundayeh traditional food. This is a tangy fermented food same like a Bosou but the differences is sinamu baka only suitable for wild bear.
- Tinonggilan is a slightly sparkling alcoholic drink made from maize. Tinonggilan is a Rungus speciality and is usually served during festive occasions, or as refreshments for guests during the performance of a ritual dance called Mongigol Sumundai.
- Tompek is a Bajau food made from grated tapioca, eaten as an alternative starchy staple to rice. The grated tapioca is squeezed to dry out mixture and crumbled, then fried or toasted until golden brown. Grated tapioca may also be packed into cylindrical shapes and steamed until it forms into a chewy tubular cake called putu, another traditional Bajau staple.
- Tuaran mee (Chinese: 斗亚兰面) is a speciality of Tuaran town. This dish of wok fried fresh handmade noodles is well known in the nearby city of Kota Kinabalu as well as in neighbouring Tamparuli town, where the localised adaptation is called Tamparuli mee (Chinese: 担波罗利炒生面). The noodles must first be toasted with oil in the wok to prevent it from clumping together, then blanched to reduce the stiff crunchy texture from toasting. The final step involves stir frying the noodles to a dry finish with eggs, vegetables, and meat or seafood.
- Tuhau (Etlingera coccinea) is a type of wild ginger, specifically the stems of the same plant popularly served as a relish by the Kadazandusun community. The stems are typically chopped up and served fresh with lime juice, or mixed with local chives and chilli peppers then cured with salt and vinegar. A more recent recipe called serunding tuhau involves slicing tuhau stems into thin floss-like shreds, which is then sauteed until it becomes golden and crisp. It has a distinctive scent which is said to have a polarising effect even among indigenous Sabahans.

=== Sarawakian food ===
Sarawakian is quite distinct from the regional cuisines of the Peninsular. It is considered less spicy, lightly prepared and with more emphasis on subtle flavours. The most important spice in Sarawakian cuisine is pepper. Pepper is commercially produced on an industrial scale as a cash crop, and the preferred choice by local cooks when heat is wanted in a dish. Granted GI status by MyIPO, Sarawak black pepper is highly regarded by international culinary figures such as Alain Ducasse.

While the Iban constitute the largest Dayak subgroup as well as the most populous ethnic group in Sarawak, much of the ethnic Iban population is still concentrated away from Sarawak's main urban areas, congregating instead within longhouse communities scattered all over the interior regions of the state. The traditional cookery of the Iban is called pansoh or pansuh, which is the preparation and cooking of food in bamboo tubes. Ingredients like poultry, fish, pork, vegetables or rice are mixed with fragrant herbs like lemongrass, tapioca leaves and bungkang leaves (a species of myrtle from the Eugenia genus), then sealed within the bamboo tubes and placed directly over an open fire. Cooking food this way will infuse it with aroma and flavour from the bamboo tubes while keeping it moist.

During Dayak festivals or Gawai, the Iban would slaughter locally reared pigs. The pig would be cleaned thoroughly after the slaughter, have its head and stomach removed, and the rest of the pig would be cut into smaller pieces in preparation for barbecuing. The head and stomach of a pig are usually put aside and prepared separately as they are considered the choicest parts of the animal; hence pig's heads are a common edible gift brought by visitors to an Iban longhouse, and dishes such as pork stomach cooked with pineapples are a must for Gawai.

Sarawak is notable for its rice; currently three varieties grown in Sarawak has been granted GI status by MyIPO. Among the foods and beverages particular to Sarawak are:

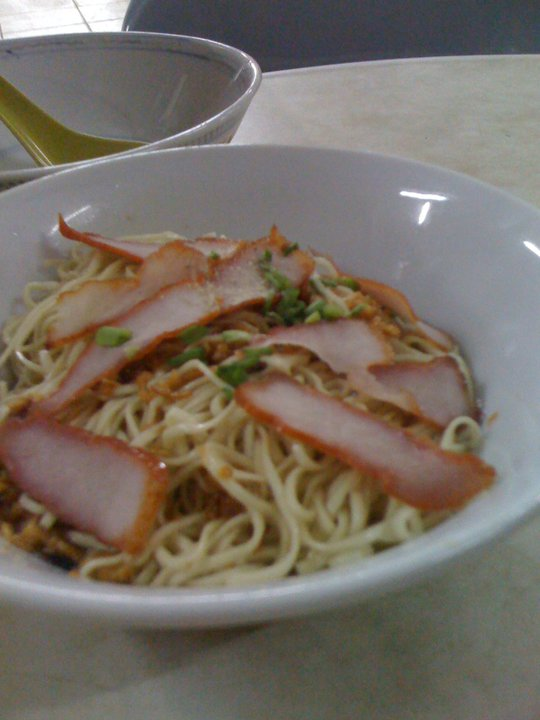
Kolo mee

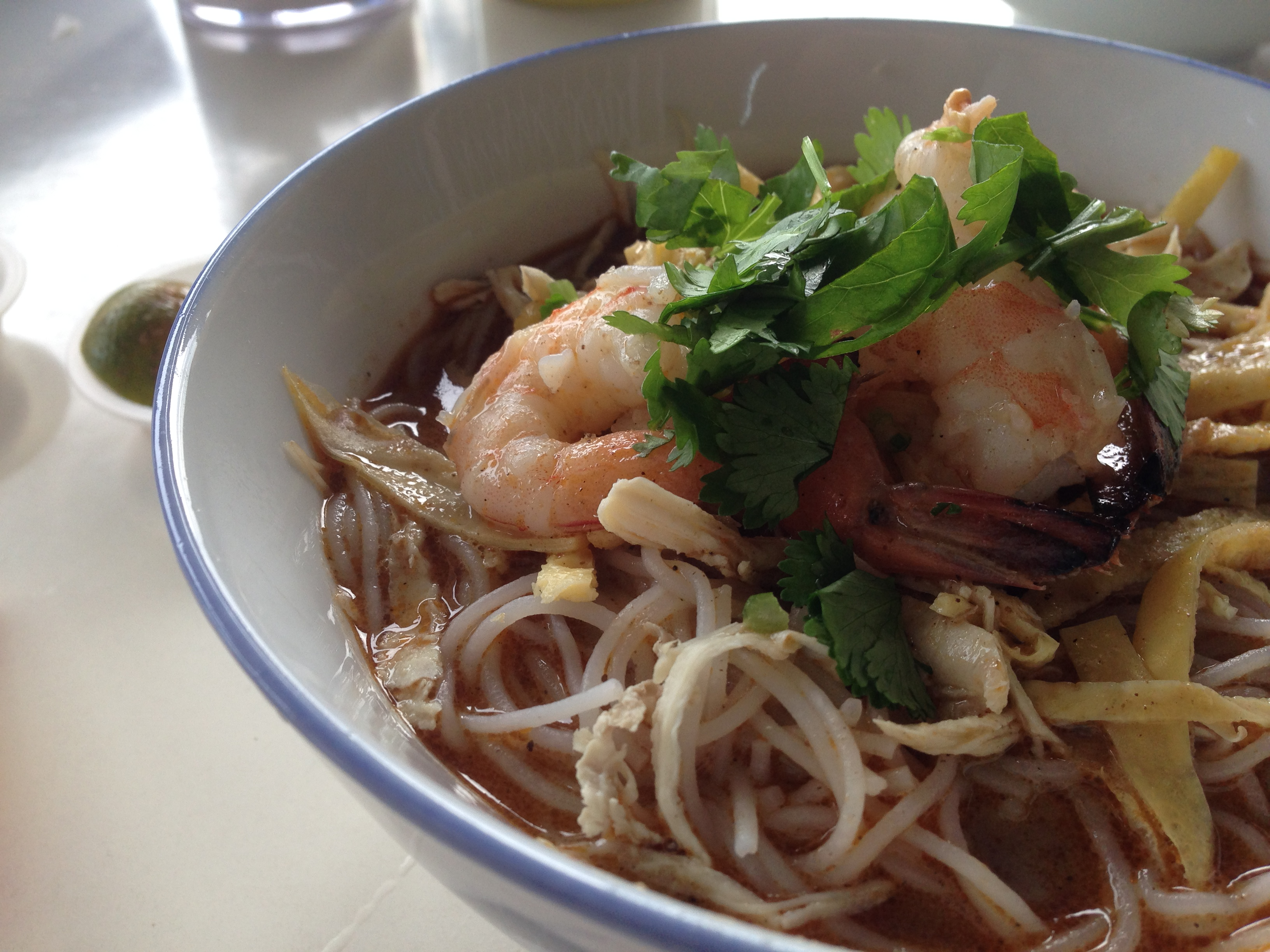
Laksa Sarawak

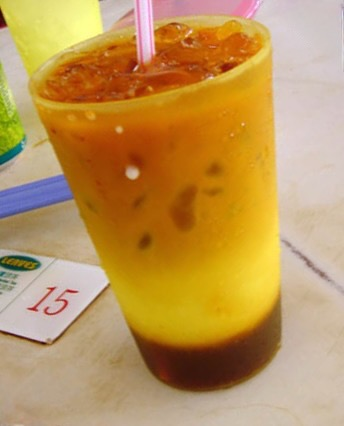
Teh C Peng Special

- Belacan bihun is rice vermicelli dressed in a gravy made from ground chillies, belacan, tamarind, and dried shrimp. It is garnished with cured cuttlefish, julienned cucumber, bean sprouts and century egg wedges.
- Bubur pedas is a type of rice congee cooked with a specially prepared spice paste, or rempah made from turmeric, lemon grass, galangal, chillies, ginger, coconut and shallots. A fairly complex and spicy dish compared to most typical congee preparations, Bubur Pedas is often prepared during the month of Ramadan and served during the breaking of fast.
- Daun ubi tumbuk or pucuk ubi tumbuk is a preparation of cassava leaves (known as empasak by the Iban) which has the consistency of pesto, and is widely eaten among Sarawak's native communities. The pounded leaves may be sauteed with seasonings like anchovies and chilli, stuffed into a bamboo tube and roasted over an open fire, or simply boiled with shallot, fat and salt.
- Ikan terubuk masin is salt-preserved toli shad, which is endemic to the coastal waters of Sarawak, stretching from Sematan to Lawas. It is considered an iconic delicacy in Sarawak, and thus a prized edible gift.
- Kasam ensabi is a fermented vegetable pickle made from an indigenous cultivar of mustard greens (ensabi) and is traditional to the Iban community.
- Kolo mee or mee kolok (Chinese: 干捞面) is a dish of springy egg noodles tossed in a sweet and savoury shallot, lard and vinegar dressing, and topped with seasoned minced pork and char siu. It is similar to Peninsular-style Hakka mee or wonton mee in concept, but differs significantly in taste profile. A popular variant uses rendered oil from cooking char siu to flavour kolo mee instead of plain lard, which gives the noodles a reddish hue. Halal versions of kolo mee replace the pork components with beef (earning the moniker of mee sapi) or chicken, and lard with peanut or vegetable oil. Additional toppings can include mushrooms, chicken and crab meat. Kampua mee (Chinese: 干盘面) is a similar dish from Sibu of Fuzhou origin.
- Laksa Sarawak or Kuching Laksa (Chinese : 古晉叻沙) is noodles (usually rice vermicelli) served in an aromatic spiced coconut milk soup, topped with shredded chicken, shredded omelette, bean sprouts, prawns, and garnished with coriander.
- Manok kacangma is a Chinese-influenced dish, traditionally taken by local women for confinement after giving birth. It consists of chicken pieces cooked with ginger and kacangma (Chinese: 益母草), often seasoned with some Chinese wine or tuak by non-Muslim cooks.
- Manok pansoh is the most typical Iban pansoh preparation of chicken seasoned with bungkang leaves, lemongrass, ginger, and tapioca leaves, then stuffed into a bamboo tube and roasted in the Uma Avok (traditional fireplace). A related Bidayuh dish is Asam Siok, with the addition of rice to the chicken mixture. These dishes are not commonly found in urban eateries and restaurants due to the practicality of roasting a bamboo tube over an open fire within a typical commercial kitchen.
- Nasi goreng dabai is rice stir-fried with dabai (Canarium odontophyllum), an indigenous fruit found only in Sarawak. It is often compared to an olive, due to their similarity in appearance as well as taste. As dabai is highly perishable and seasonal in nature, this dish is also prepared with preserved dabai paste.
- Nuba laya is cooked Bario rice which is mashed and wrapped in leaves of the phacelophrynium maximum plant. It is considered the centerpiece of a meal for the Lun Bawang and Kelabit people. Accompaniments may include a small bowl of porridge (kikid), shredded beef cooked with wild ginger and dried chilli (labo senutuq), deboned shredded fish (a'beng), wild jungle vegetables prepared in various ways, and so on.
- Sinamu Baka is a Lun Bawang/Lundayeh traditional food. This is a tangy fermented food same like Bosuo but the differences is Sinamu Baka only suitable for wild bear meat.
- Sup Terung Dayak is a popular soup dish made with a native cultivar of wild eggplant, which is spherical in shape and slightly larger than a navel orange. Also called terung asam due to its natural tart flavour, this eggplant species comes in bright hues ranging from yellow to orange. Other ingredients for the soup may include fish, prawns, or fish products (dried, salted or smoked fish).
- Tebaloi is a sago biscuit snack which is traditionally associated with the Melanau people of Sarawak.
- Three layer tea or Teh C Peng Special is an iced concoction of brewed tea, evaporated milk and gula apong (nirah palm sugar) syrup, carefully presented un-stirred in three or more layers. Originally from Kuching, its popularity has spread to other areas of Sarawak as well as neighbouring Sabah.
- Tuak is a type of liquor traditional to Sarawak's Dayak communities. It is most commonly made from fermented normal or glutinous rice, but there is no accepted convention or definition on what constitutes tuak. Tuak is essentially an alcoholic drink produced by fermenting anything that contains carbohydrates, as long as it is made in Sarawak by Sarawakians. with The Bidayuh in particular are known for their skill and expertise in brewing tuak: ingredients for tuak variants include sugarcane (tepui), tampoi (a wild fruit with a sweet and tart flavour), pineapples and apples. Tuak is normally served as a welcoming drink to guests, and as an important component for ritual events and festive occasions like Gawai and Christmas. Tuak may also be distilled to make a spirit called langkau.
- Umai is a traditional Melanau food, accompanied with a bowl of baked or toasted sago pearls. There are two different versions of umai – the traditional sambal campur and a more contemporary variation called sambal cecah jeb. The former is a raw seafood salad which consists of raw sliced seafood (anything from freshwater and seawater fish, prawns and even jellyfish) cured in calamansi lime juice, tossed with ground peanuts, sliced onions and chillies. For umai jeb, the raw sliced seafood is undressed, and is simply dipped into a spicy sauce for consumption.
- White Lady is a chilled drink made with milk, mango juice, longan and pineapple. Invented in 1975 by a Kuching hawker, multiple variations can be found in various hawker stalls throughout the city.

=== Peranakan food ===
Peranakan cuisine, also called Nyonya food, was developed by the Straits Chinese whose descendants reside in today's Malaysia and Singapore. The old Malay word nyonya (also spelled nonya), a term of respect and affection for women of prominent social standing (part "madame" and part "auntie"), has come to refer to the cuisine of the Peranakans. It uses mainly Chinese ingredients but blends them with Malay ingredients such as coconut milk, lemon grass, turmeric, tamarind, pandan leaves, chillies and sambal. It can be considered as a blend of Chinese and Malay cooking, with influences from Indonesian Chinese cuisine (for the Nyonya food of Malaccan and Singaporean) and Thai cuisine (for Penang Nyonya cuisine). Traditional Nyonya cooking is often very elaborate, labour-intensive and time-consuming, and the Peranakan community often consider the best Nyonya food is to be found in private homes.

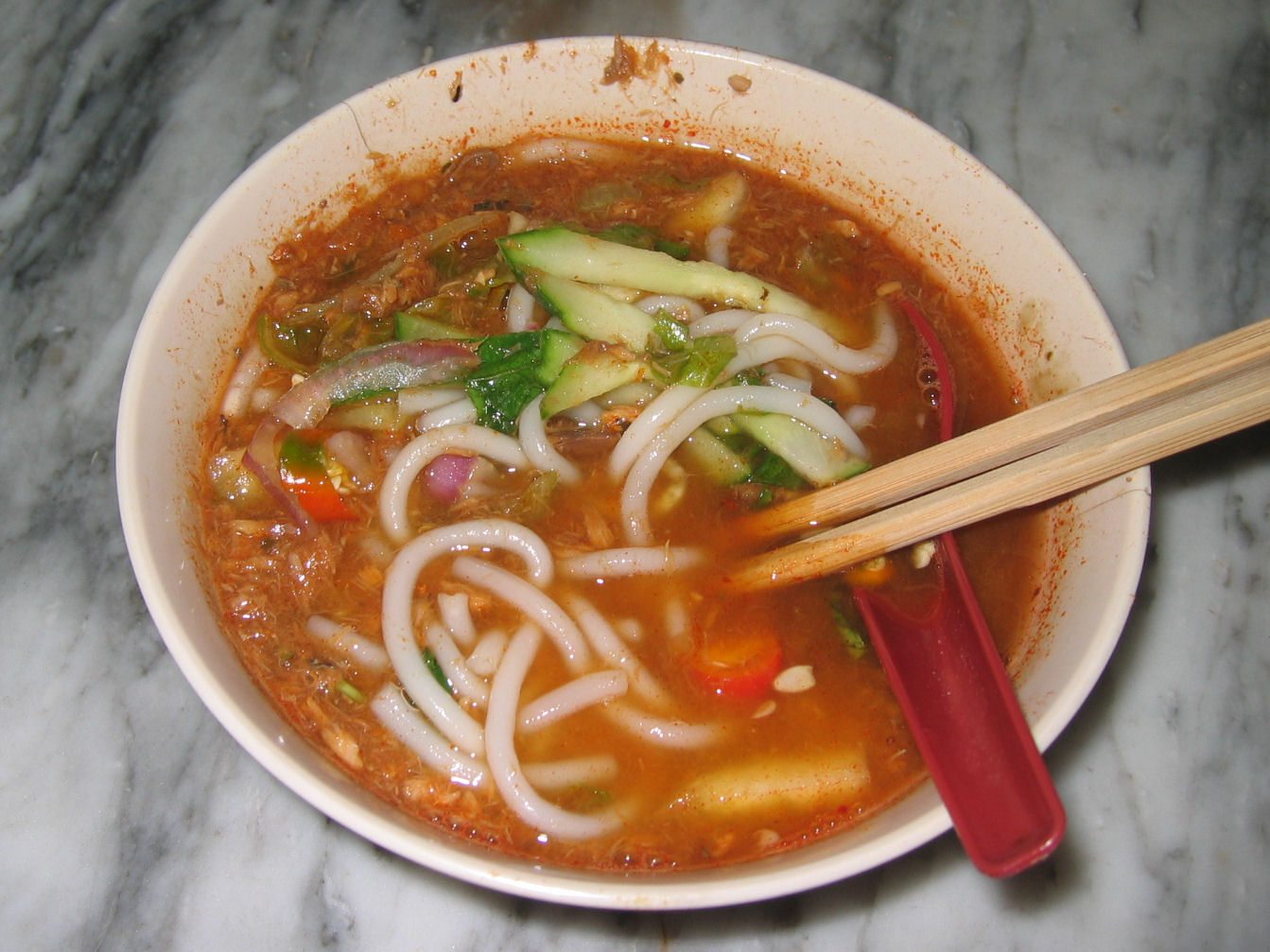
A bowl of Asam laksa

Examples of Nyonya dishes include:

- Acar, various pickled meats and vegetables like acar keat-lah (honey lime/calamansi), achar hu (fried fish), acar kiam hu (salt fish), acar timun (cucumber), acar awat (mixed vegetables).
- Asam Laksa (Mandarin: 亞三叻沙). Considered one of Penang's three signature dishes, Asam laksa is similar to the Malay laksa utara, which consists of a bowl of translucent al dente rice noodles served in a spicy soup made of fish (usually mackerel), tamarind (both asam jawa and asam gelugor), and daun kesum. Toppings differ considerably, and may include onion, mint, chopped torch ginger flower, and slices of pineapple and cucumber. A dollop of pungent, viscous sweet fermented shrimp paste (Petis udang or Hae Ko) is usually served on the side.
- Ayam buah keluak, a chicken stew cooked with the nuts from the Kepayang tree (Pangium edule). For this recipe, the contents of the buah keluak is dug out and sauteed with aromatics and seasonings, before it is stuffed back into the nuts and braised with the chicken pieces.
- Ayam/Babi Pongteh, a stew of chicken or pork cooked with tauchu or salted fermented soy beans, and gula melaka. It is usually saltish-sweet and can be substituted as a soup dish in Peranakan cuisine. Commonly use pork as this is a Peranakan version of Chinese braised pork belly.
- Babi assam, a pork stew cooked with tamarind juice. The Kristang community also cook a similar dish of pork in tamarind gravy.
- Enche Kabin, deep fried chicken pieces marinated in a paste of coconut milk and rempah (spices).
- Itik Tim or Kiam Chye Ark Th'ng is a soup of duck, preserved mustard greens and cabbage flavoured with nutmeg, Chinese mushrooms, tomatoes and peppercorns.
- Jiu Hu Char is a dish made up mainly of shredded vegetables like turnip or jicama, carrot, and cabbage and fried together with thinly shredded dried cuttlefish.
- Kari Kapitan is a Penang Nonya take on the ubiquitous chicken curry. Kaffir lime leaves and coconut milk are among the key ingredients for this mild curry.
- Kerabu Bee Hoon is a salad dish consisting of rice vermicelli mixed with sambal belacan, calamansi lime juice, and finely chopped herbs and spices. Other famous salad dishes are kerabu bok ni (cloud ear fungus/tikus telinga), kerabu ke (chicken), kerabu ke-kha (chicken feet), kerabu timun (cucumber), kerabu kobis (cabbage), kerabu kacang botol (four angled bean), kerabu bak pue (pork skin).
- Kiam Chye Boey is a mixture of leftovers from Kiam Chye Ark Th'ng, Jiu Hu Char, Tu Thor Th'ng and various other dishes. "Boey" literally means "end".
- Laksa lemak is a type of laksa served in a rich coconut gravy, served with prawns, cockles, lime and a dollop of sambal belacan.
- Masak titik is a style of vegetable soup that makes liberal use of white peppercorns. One version uses watermelon rind as the main ingredient. Another makes use of green or semi ripe papaya.
- Nasi kunyit, glutinous rice seasoned with turmeric powder, coconut milk and asam gelugur. It is usually served with a chicken curry, ang koo kueh, and pink-dyed hard-boiled eggs as gifts in celebration of a child of friends and family turning one month old.
- Nyonya Bak Chang, Nonya-style zongzi made in a similar manner as a typical southern Chinese zongzi. However, the filling is typically minced pork with candied winter melon, ground roasted peanuts, and a spice mix. The blue butterfly pea flower is used to colour the rice with a shade of blue, and pandan leaves are sometimes used as the wrapping instead.
- Nyonya chap chye, the Nyonya take of this Chinese Indonesian classic incorporates tauchu and dried or fresh prawns.
- Otak-otak, a dish involving fish pieces wrapped in banana leaves. Two very different variations exist: one consists of a mixture of fish pieces and spice paste wrapped in banana leaves and char grilled. This version is particularly associated with the state of Malacca and the town of Muar, Johor. Penang-style otak-otak takes the form of a delicate steamed parcel, and the robust red-hued spice paste is eschewed in favour of a base of a spiced custard as well as aromatic herbs like daun kaduk.
- Perut ikan, a spicy stew (similar to asam pedas in flavour profile) comprising mainly vegetables/herbs and getting its distinctive taste mainly from fish bellies preserved in brine and daun kaduk (The Wild Pepper leaf is from the Piper stylosum or the Piper sarmentosum). A classic Penang Nyonya dish.
- Pie Tee, A thin and crispy pastry tart shell filled with a spicy, sweet mixture of thinly sliced vegetables and prawns.
- Roti babi, a sandwich of spiced minced pork, dipped in its entirety in egg wash and deep fried. Roti babi is typically served with a dip of Worcestershire sauce and sliced red chillies.
- Seh Bak, a dish of pork marinated overnight with herbs and spices, then cooked over a slow fire and simmered to tenderness. Seh Bak is also traditional to Malacca's Eurasian community.
- Ter Thor T'ng, this soup of pig stomach requires a skilled cook to prepare and deodorise the ingredients thoroughly before cooking. Its main ingredients are pig stomach and white peppercorns.

=== Eurasian food ===
- Ambilla, a tangy dish of meat cooked with long beans (kacang), brinjals (terung) or pumpkin (labu).
- Caldu Pescator, A seafood soup traditionally prepared by fishermen, as well as during the Feast of St Peter ("Festa San Pedro", in the local Cristang dialect, usually observed on 29 June), the Patron Saint of Fishermen.
- Curry Debal, a quintessential Kristang dish, usually cooked during Christmas season to make use of the left-over meats from feasting. It is a very spicy curry flavoured with candlenuts, galangal and vinegar.
- Curry Seku, a very dry curry prepared in a wok. Seku means "bottom" in Papia Kristang, and the wok was probably so-named because of the roundness of its shape that resembled the human bottom.
- Chicken chop, also known as Hainanese chicken chop, invented by the Hainanese migrant workers during the Malaya period. The cuisine is similar with the American chicken fried steak but different on sides; the gravy is made with the black pepper sauce or sometimes Worcestershire sauce, and the dish comes with a side of fries and vegetables.
- Chicken pie, this meat pie, known as empada de galinha or galinha pia, is usually served during Christmas season and other special occasions.
- Feng, a curried dish of pig offal, traditionally served for Christmas.
- Pang Susi, a savoury meat bun with a dough that is bread-like and sweet in texture, made for auspicious and festive occasions such as Easter.
- Pesce Assa or commonly known as Ikan Bakar or Sambal stingray, Portuguese baked/grilled fish is one of the Kristang community's most famous specialties, now found in major urban areas throughout Malaysia. The fish is smothered with diced lady's fingers and a robust sambal, before it is wrapped in banana leaves as well as a layer of metal foil, and then cooked on a grill. In spite of its name, this dish has little in common with modern Portuguese fish recipes.
- Semur or Smoore, a fragrant beef stew. Versions of this dish are found wherever the Dutch have settled in Asia, including Malacca.
- Soy Limang, a braised dish of fried brinjals, with soy sauce and lime juice as the primary seasonings.

== Kuih (delicacy) and snack ==
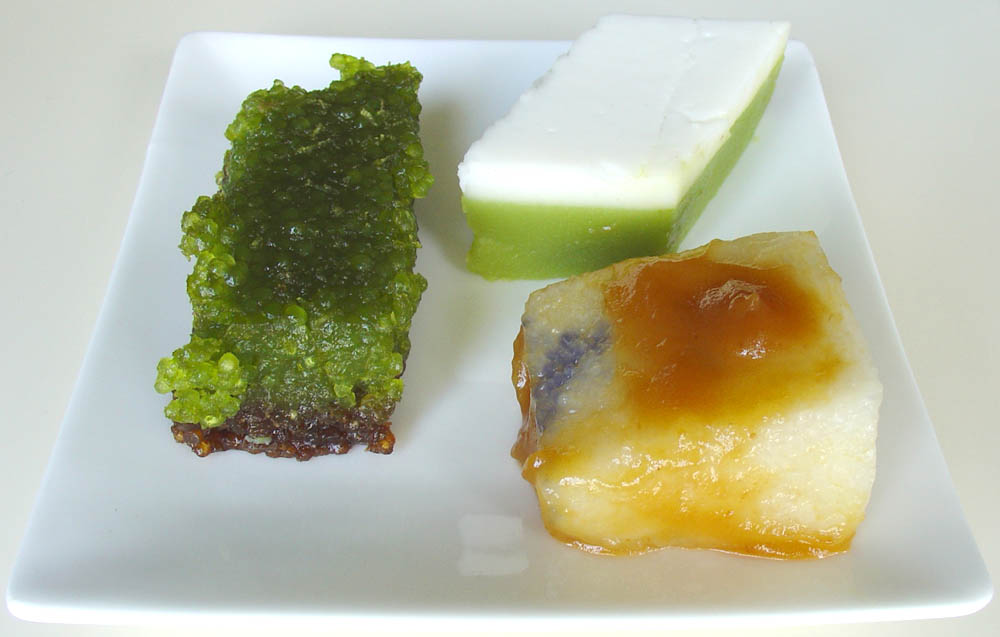
A selection of Nyonya kuih

Kuih (plural: kuih-muih) are usually, but not always, bite-sized foods associated with the Malay and Min-speaking Chinese communities of Malaysia. In the context of the term being cultural as opposed to being physically descriptive, the concept of kuih may refer to a selection of cakes, cookies, confections, pastries and sweetmeats. Kuih may be eaten throughout the day for light breakfast, afternoon tea (a tradition adopted from the British), as a snack and increasingly as an after-meal course.

More often steamed or fried and based on rice or glutinous rice, kuih items are very different in texture, flavour and appearance from Western oven-baked cakes or puff pastries. Most kuih items are sweet, and may be classified and eaten as desserts, but some are also savoury. Kuih is an important feature of festive occasions and is traditionally made at home, but is now available for purchase from home caterers, street vendors, market stallholders and specialist cafes, shops and restaurants. It is difficult to distinguish between kuih of Malay or Peranakan (also known as "Straits Chinese") origin because the histories of traditional kuih recipes have not been well-documented, and cross-cultural influences over the centuries were commonplace. Even the word kuih itself is derived from the Hokkien/Teochew word 粿 (pronounced kueh or kway).

Examples of notable kuih-muih include:

- Ang koo kueh (Chinese: 紅龜粿), a small round or oval-shaped Chinese pastry with red-coloured soft sticky glutinous rice flour skin wrapped around a sweet filling in the centre.
- Apam balik, a turnover pancake with a texture similar to a crumpet with crisp edges, made from a thin flour-based batter with raising agent. It is typically cooked on a griddle and topped with caster sugar, ground peanut, creamed corn, and grated coconut in the middle, and then turned over. Many different takes on this dish exist as part of the culinary repertoire of the Malay, Chinese, Peranakan, Indonesian, and ethnic Bornean communities, all under different names.
- Bahulu, tiny crusty sponge cakes which come in distinctive shapes like buttons and goldfish, acquired from being baked in moulded pans. Bahulu is usually baked and served for festive occasions.
- Cek Mek Molek is a sweet snack popular in Kelantan and Terengganu, which is made from mashed sweet potatoes mixed with flour, shaped into small ovals, and filled with sugar.
- Cucur, deep-fried fritters, sometimes known as jemput-jemput. Typical varieties include cucur udang (fritters studded with a whole unshelled prawn), cucur badak (sweet potato fritters), and cucur kodok (banana fritters).
- Curry puff, a small pie filled with a curried filling, usually chicken or potatoes, in a deep-fried or baked pastry shell.
- Cincin, a deep fried dough pastry-based snack popular with East Malaysia's Muslim communities.
- Dadar/ketayap, a rolled crepe (usually flavoured with pandan juice) and filled with grated sweet coconut filling (flavoured with palm sugar).
- Jelurut, also known as kuih selorot in Sarawak, this kuih is made from a mixture of gula apong and rice flour, then rolled with palm leaves into cones and steamed.
- Jongkong, a traditional treat from Perak. It is a soft, steamed kuih made from a combination of rice flour, green pandan custard, and a sweet palm sugar (gula Melaka) filling. The layers typically consist of a green pandan layer on top, a rich coconut milk layer in the middle, and melted palm sugar at the bottom.
- Kapit, sapit or sepi, crispy folded coconut-flavoured wafer biscuits, colloquially known as "love letters".
- Kochi, glutinous rice dumplings filled with a sweet paste, shaped into pyramids and wrapped with banana leaves.
- Niangao (Chinese : 年糕) or kuih bakul, a brown sticky and sweet rice cake customarily associated with Chinese New Year festivities. It is also available year-round as a popular street food, made with pieces of niangao sandwiched between slices of taro and sweet potato, dipped in batter and deep-fried.
- Pie tee, this Nyonya speciality is a thin and crispy pastry tart shell filled with a spicy, sweet mixture of thinly sliced vegetables and prawns.
- Onde onde, small round balls made from glutinous rice flour coloured and flavoured with pandan, filled with palm sugar syrup and rolled in freshly grated coconut.
- Or kuih (Chinese : 芋粿), a steamed savoury cake made from pieces of taro (commonly known as "yam" in Malaysia), dried prawns and rice flour. It is then topped with deep fried shallots, spring onions, sliced chilli and dried prawns, and usually served with a chilli dipping sauce.
- Pineapple tart, flaky pastries filled with or topped with pineapple jam.
- Pinjaram or penyaram, a saucer-shaped deep fried fritter with crisp edges and a dense, chewy texture towards the centre. It is widely sold by street food vendors in the open air markets of East Malaysia.
- Putu piring, a round steamed cake made of rice flour dough with a palm sugar-sweetened filling.
- Seri muka, a two-layered kuih with steamed glutinous rice forming the bottom half and a green custard layer made with pandan juice.
- Tahi Itik, a traditional Malay dessert that originates from the east coast of Malaysia, particularly in Kelantan. Despite its rather unappealing name—which translates literally to “duck droppings”—the kuih is actually a sweet and cherished delicacy. It is made primarily from egg whites, sugar, and rice flour, and sometimes flavored with fragrant pandan. The dessert has a soft, sticky, and slightly chewy texture, and is usually served with a rich syrup made from coconut milk and palm sugar. The name “tahi itik” comes from its lumpy, irregular appearance, which is said to resemble duck droppings.
- Wajid or wajik, a compressed Malay confection made of glutinous rice cooked with coconut milk and gula melaka.

Mee siput muar

Examples include:

- Lekor, a keropok fish cracker snack.
- Mee siput muar, a deep-fried circular dried noodle snack, made from flour with other ingredients, eaten with sambal.
- Rempeyek, a deep-fried savoury cracker, made from flour with other ingredients, bound or coated by crispy flour batter.

== Desserts and sweets ==
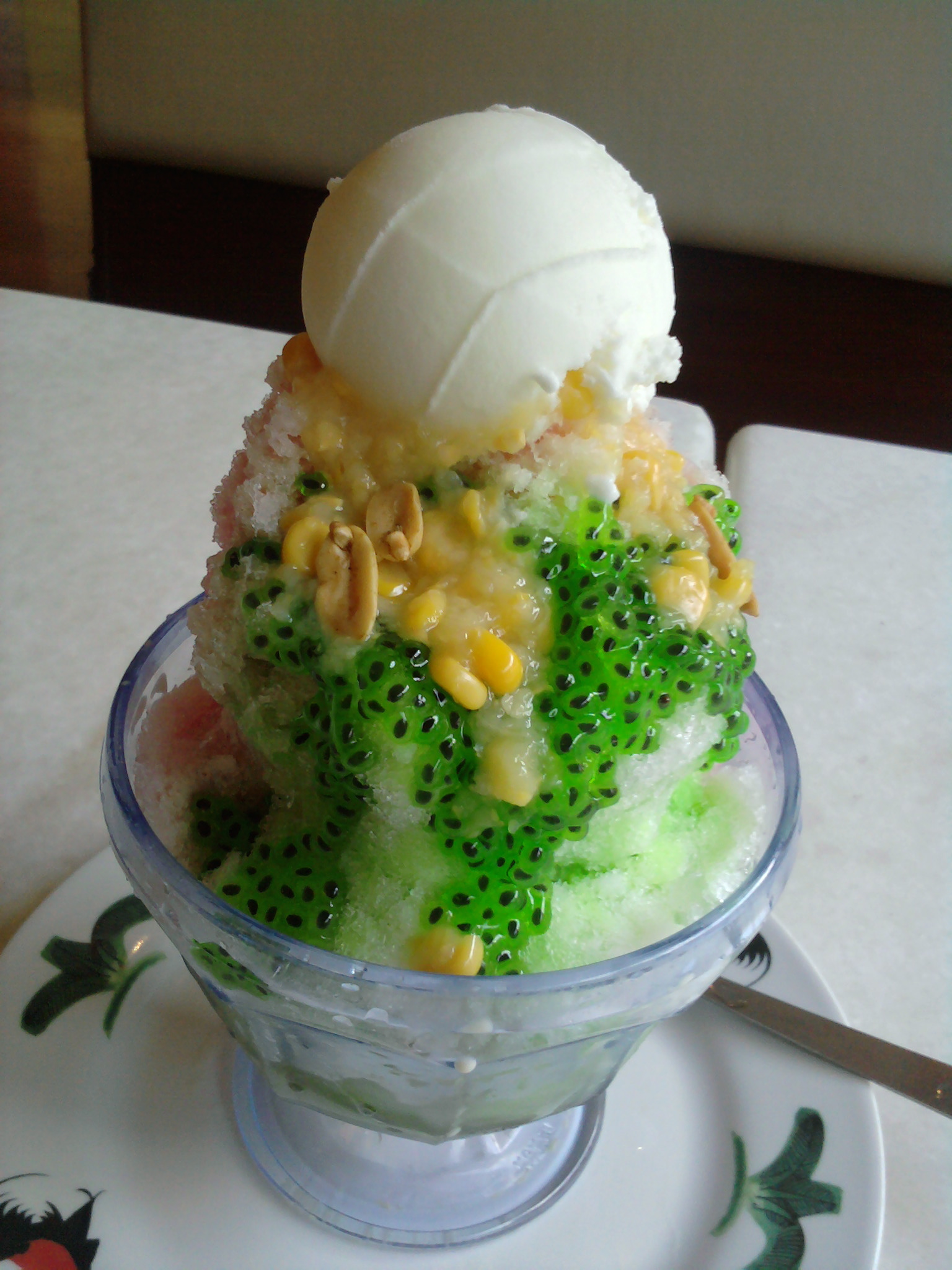
Ais kacang

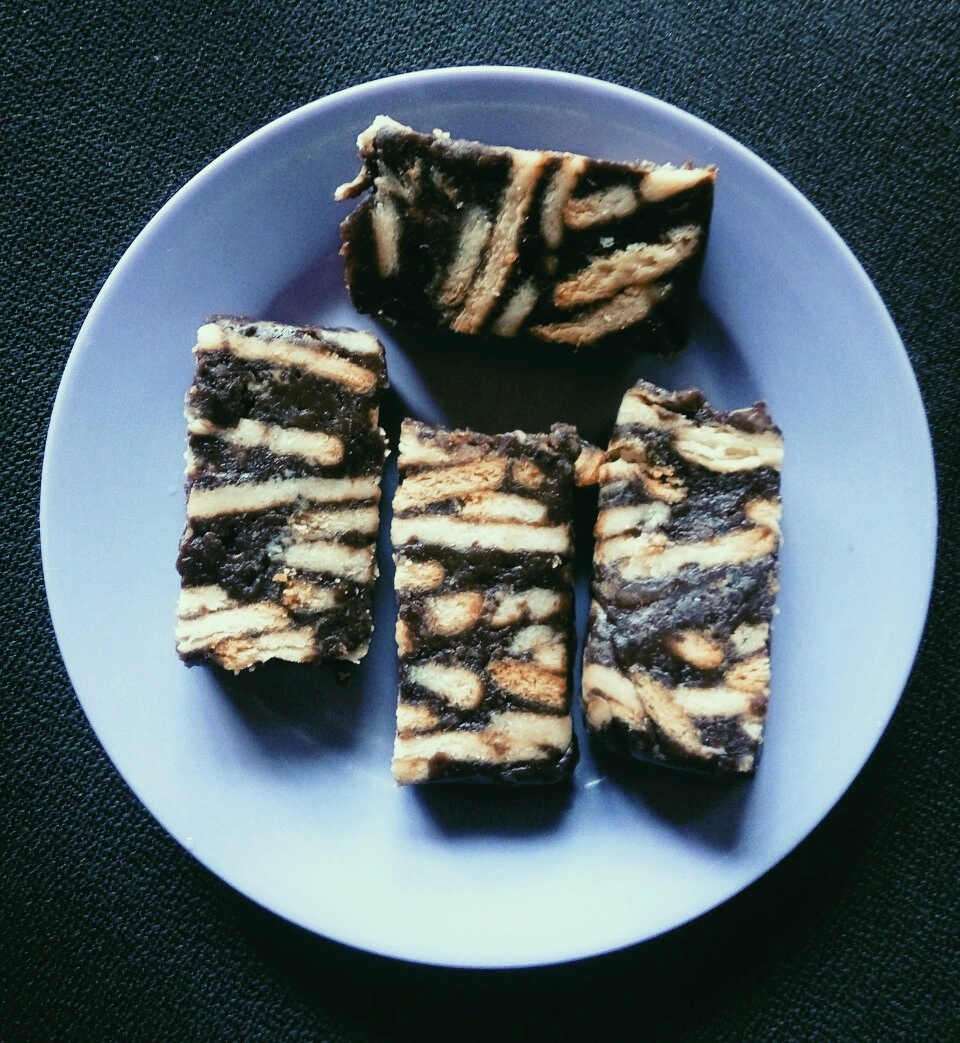
Batik cake

Desserts and sweets in Malaysia are diverse, due to the multi-ethnic and multicultural characteristics of its society. Traditional Malay and Nyonya desserts tend to share a common feature however: generous amounts of coconut milk are used, and the finished product usually flavoured with gula melaka (palm sugar) and pandan leaves. Some notable desserts include:

- Agar agar, the Malay word for a species of red algae. A natural vegetarian gelatin counterpart, agar-agar is used to make puddings and flavoured jellies like almond tofu, as well as fruit aspics.
- Ais kacang, also known as air batu campur or abbreviated as ABC, this dessert consists of a base of shaved ice, coloured syrup, and evaporated or condensed milk with a variety of toppings. These may include sweet corn kernels, red beans, kidney beans, cincau (grass jelly), cendol, buah atap (fruit of the nipa palm), soaked basil seeds, peanuts, and ice cream.
- Aiskrim potong, an ice cream popsicle made from coconut milk or milk, flavoured with localised ingredients like red beans, rose syrup, durian, pandan, creamed corn and jackfruit. Its texture is different from Western ice cream; aiskrim potong is less creamy and has a slightly starchy taste when it begins to melt.
- Batik cake, a type of chocolate cake similar to the hedgehog slice made using Marie biscuit.
- Bolu cocu, a traditional Kristang cake topped with liberal amounts of shredded coconut and served with a custard sauce.
- Bubur cha cha, a Nyonya dessert of bananas, sweet potatoes, taro, black eyed beans and sago pearls cooked in pandan-flavoured coconut milk. May be served hot or cold.
- Bubur kacang hijau, mung bean porridge cooked with coconut milk and sweetened with palm or cane sugar. It is called canje mungoo by the Kristang community, and is usually served in conjunction with the feast day of St John the Baptist (Festa da San Juang).

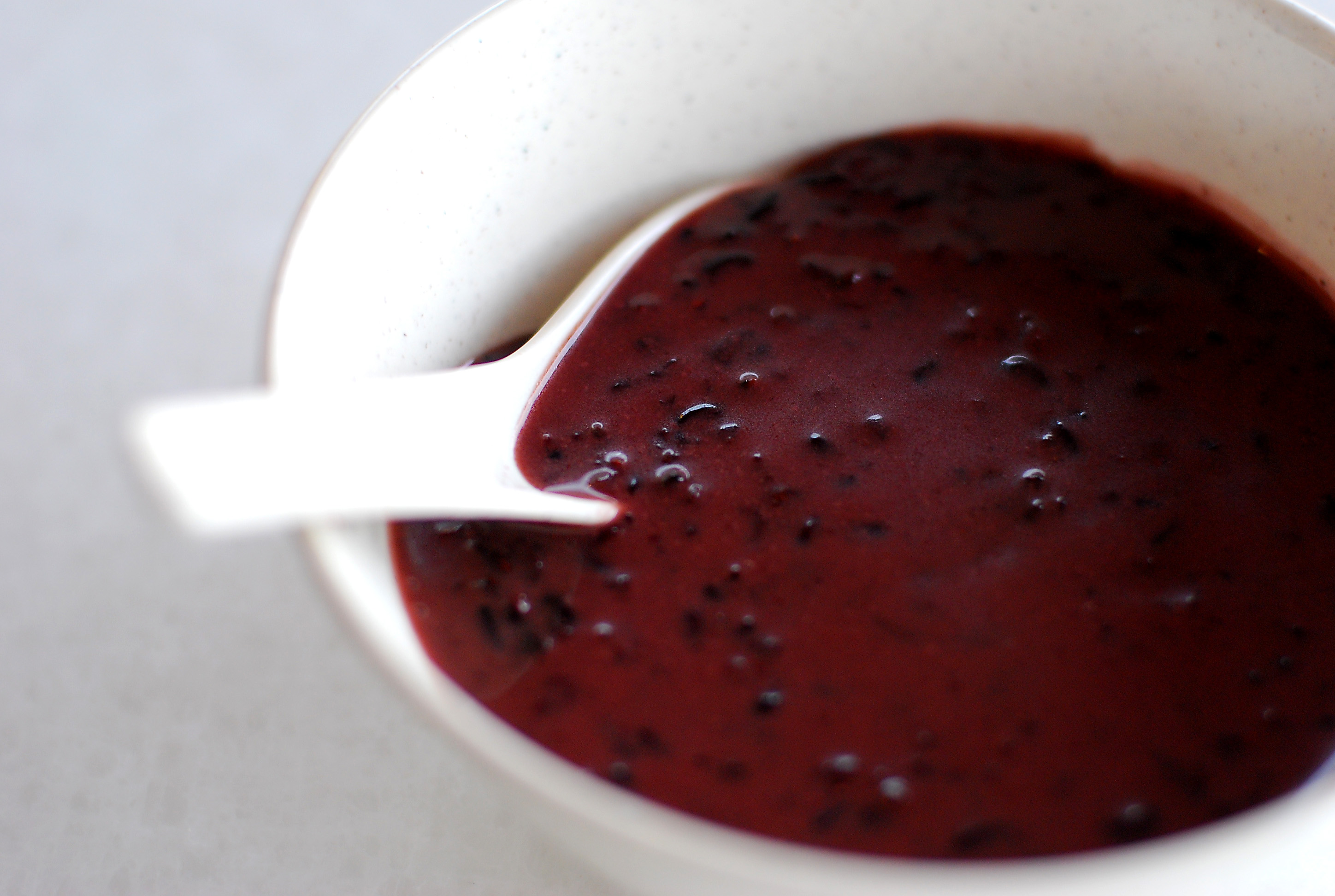
Bubur pulut hitam, without coconut milk.

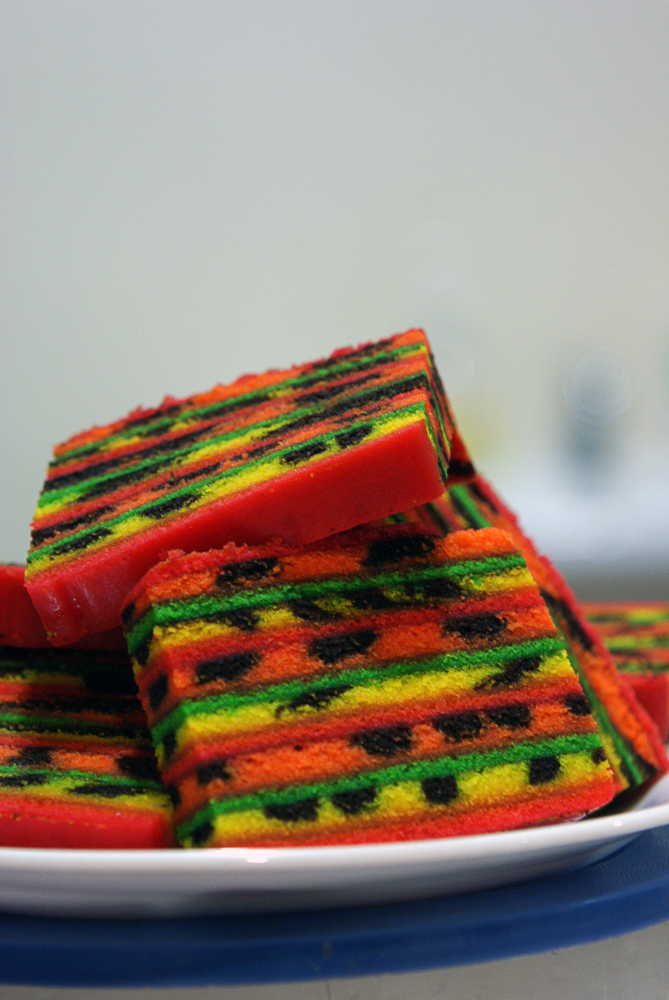
Sarawak layered cake.

- Bubur pulut hitam, black glutinous rice porridge cooked with palm sugar and pandan leaves, served hot with coconut milk.
- Cendol, smooth green-coloured droplets made from mung bean or rice flour, usually served by itself in chilled coconut milk and gula melaka, or as a topping for ABC. In Malacca, mashed durian is a popular topping for cendol.
- Coconut candy, a confection of grated coconut, sugar, condensed milk, flavouring and colouring, coconut candies are a popular sweet served at homes during festive occasions and available at restaurants specialising in Indian sweets.
- Dadih, a Malay dairy-based dessert made from milk, sugar and salt which has been acidified with whey (obtained by fermenting milk overnight with asam gelugur) and steamed to form a custard like texture. Although popular in contemporary recipes, agar agar is not used as a gelling agent for authentic dadih.
- Dodol, a sweet, sticky, and thick toffee-like confection, made with heavily reduced coconut milk, jaggery, and rice flour. Commonly served during festivals such as Eid ul-Fitr and Eid al-Adha as sweet treats for children.
- Halva or Halwa, the term refers to a range of dense and sweet confections in Malaysia bearing similar names, though they may have little in common in terms of ingredients and texture. Various types of fudge-like flour and nut-based halva cooked with ghee, which are based on traditional recipes brought over from India, are commonly available at specialist sweet shops and regularly prepared by the Indian communities for festive occasions. The Malay community have different recipes for a range of confectionery bearing similar names, which includes candied fruit and Halwa Maskat, a gelatinous jelly made from flour, ghee and pieces of fruit or nut which is similar in texture to Turkish delight.
- Hinompuka, a native Sabahan steamed confection traditionally wrapped in banana or irik (phacelophrynium maximum) leaves. Sold in local markets and is also an essential food item for celebrating weddings, birthdays and festivals, hinompuka is made with a moistened blend of pounded white glutinous rice and purplish-black glutinous rice (tadung) sweetened with brown or palm sugar. Kadazandusun communities beyond Sabah's West Coast Division make similar desserts but are known under different names, including but not limited to bintanok, lompuka, tinapung, and pais. Variations include the substitution of rice flour batter with grated tapioca or mashed corn kernels; banana leaves or coconut husks as alternative wrappers; and the addition of ripe bananas or freshly grated coconut to the starchy mixture.
- Keria Gula Melaka, is a type of doughnuts that made of sweet potato and slicked with smoky gula Melaka, Malaysian palm sugar.
- Ladoo, the most popular of all Indian sweetmeats in Malaysia, particularly during Diwali/Deepavali season, ladoo comes in many different flavours. A typical ladoo recipe involves cooking chickpea flour, semolina and ground coconut in ghee.
- Leng chee kang (Chinese: 莲子羹; Jyutping: lin4 zi2 gang1, erroneously named lai chi kang or lai chee kang), a mixture of cooked ingredients immersed in a sweet soup. Ingredients vary greatly depending on the cook, but lotus seed is always the primary ingredient, and the soup may include dried longan, white fungus, barley, kembang semangkuk jelly and rock sugar as secondary ingredients. Leng Chee Kang may be served warm or cold.
- Matterhorn, crushed ice with pineapples, longan, cendol, grass jelly and lemon slices. The Kuching hawker who came up with this popular dessert as well as the original White Lady drink was inspired by the Matterhorn, an ice-capped mountain on the Swiss-Italian border.
- Mooncake (Chinese : 月饼), round or rectangular pastries with a rich thick filling, traditionally eaten during the Mid-Autumn Festival and accompanied with Chinese tea. Both the traditional baked mooncake and the snow skin version are popular and widely available in Malaysia during the festival season.
- Nanggiu, a Kadazandusun dessert, which consists of jelly noodles made from fresh sago flour cooked in a coconut milk soup sweetened with palm sugar.
- Pandan cake, coloured and flavoured with pandan juice, this light and fluffy cake is also known as pandan chiffon.
- Payasam, a sweet spiced pudding made from starchy staples like rice or vermicelli, payasam is an integral part of traditional South Indian culture.
- Pengat, a soupy dessert cooked with gula melaka and coconut milk. Also known as serawa, pengat is made with pieces of fruit like banana, jackfruit and durian, or root vegetables like sweet potatoes and tapioca. It may be reduced further into a thick dipping sauce and served with glutinous rice, roti jala, or pancakes (lempeng).
- Pisang goreng, a common snack sold by street vendors, battered fried bananas are also served in a more elaborate manner at some cafes and restaurants as a dessert. Cempedak and various tuber vegetables are also battered and fried in the same manner as variations.
- Puding Diraja, also known as Royal Pudding, this dessert was developed and served to the royal family of Pahang state. Its basic ingredients are pisang lemak manis (a local cultivar of banana), evaporated milk, prunes, candied cherries and cashew nuts. The pudding is garnished with jala emas, and served with a cold sauce made from milk and cornflour. Nowadays it is popularly served during Ramadan, as well as a special afternoon tea treat for the family on weekends.
- Pulut tai tai, also known as pulut tekan and pulut tetal, a Nyonya glutinous rice dessert.
- Sago pudding, a dessert of cooked translucent sago pearls, which may be served as a liquid dessert with coconut milk and palm sugar, or allowed to set as a pudding (sagu gula melaka) and drizzled with thickened coconut milk and gula melaka syrup.
- Sarawak layer cake, these famously intricate layer cakes are essential for festive occasions celebrated throughout Sarawak, like Hari Raya, Chinese New Year, Gawai and Christmas.
- Sugee cake, a baked speciality of the Eurasian community, made with semolina flour and a high concentration of egg yolks.
- Tangyuan (Chinese : 汤圆 or 湯圓), plain white or coloured sweet dumplings made from glutinous rice flour. Traditionally homemade and eaten during Yuanxiao (Chinese : 元宵) as well as the Dongzhi Festival (Chinese : 冬至), tangyuan is now available year around sold as dessert. Tangyuan dumplings with filling are usually served in a lightly sweetened clear syrup, while unfilled ones are served as part of a sweet dessert soup.
- Tapai, a popular dessert at Malay homes throughout Peninsular Malaysia during Hari Raya, made from fermented glutinous rice or tapioca. Tapai may be eaten on its own, or served with contemporary toppings like ice cream, chocolate and fruit. Not to be confused with the alcoholic beverage from Sabah, also known as tapai, which is made from the same ingredients and with similar methods but have undergone advanced stages of fermentation to produce alcoholic content.
- Tau foo fah or Dau Huay (Chinese : 豆腐花 or 豆花), a velvety pudding of very soft silken tofu, traditionally flavoured with a brown sugar syrup.
- UFO tart (Chinese : 牛屎堆), this consists of a flat, thin base of baked mini butter sponge cake topped with a creamy egg custard, which is in turn crowned with a meringue slurry. Its name in Chinese literally means "cow pile dung", which alludes to the piped shape of the cake base's toppings and the meringue's darker shade as a result of caramelisation. Popularized by a Hainanese bakery in Sandakan in the 1950s, the popularity of these treats has spread to Kota Kinabalu and several other towns in Sabah.

== See also ==
- Alcohol in Malaysia
- Chinese cuisine
- Cuisine of Singapore
- Indian cuisine
- Ipoh cuisine
- List of Malaysian dishes
- List of Michelin starred restaurants in Malaysia
- Malay cuisine
- Penang cuisine
- Chef Wan, celebrity chef
- Zamzani Abdul Wahab, celebrity chef
- Christmas Island cuisine
- Cocos (Keeling) Islands cuisine
