= Rendang =

Southeast Asian dish

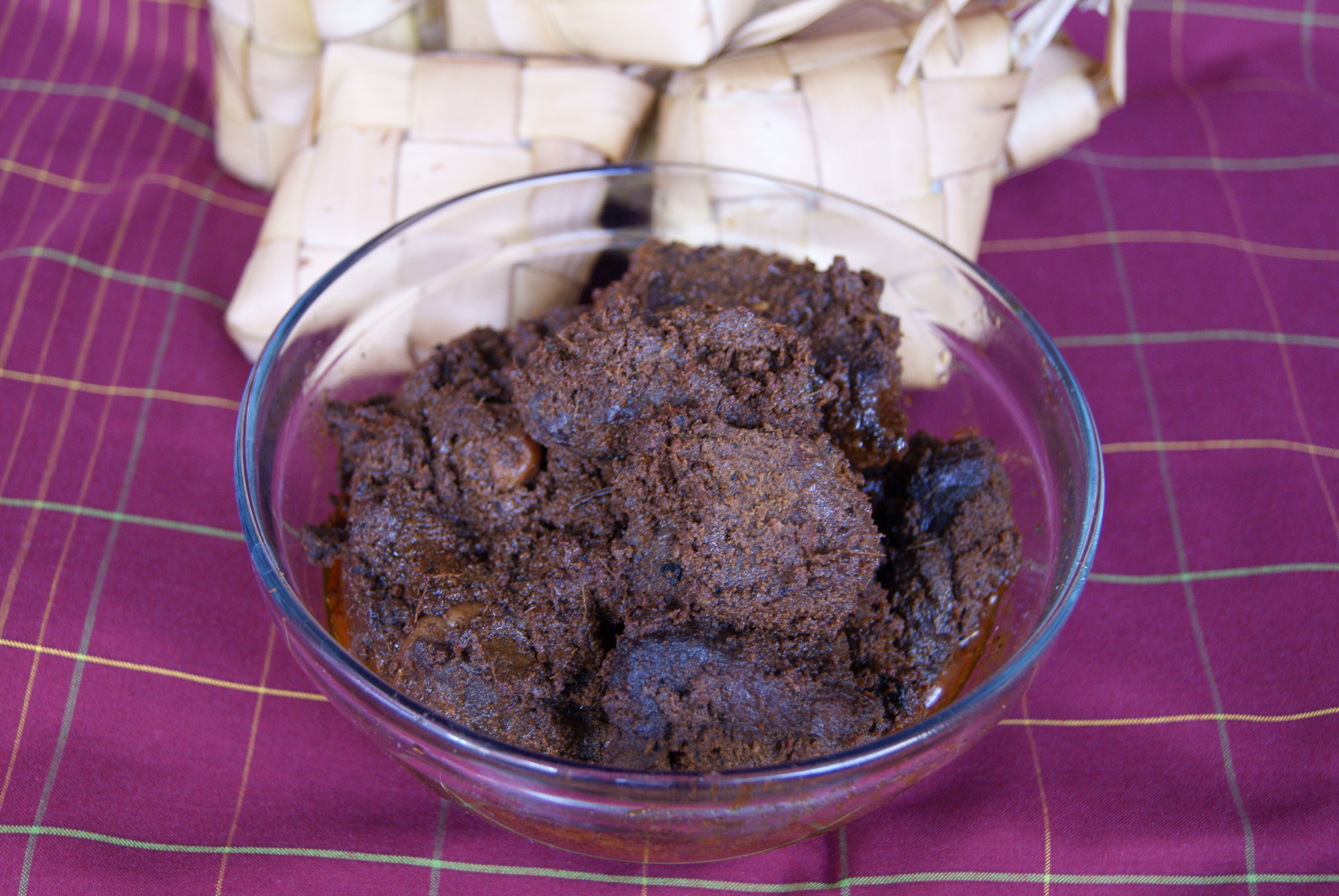
- Minangkabau randang from Padang
- Alternative names: samba randang, riyandang
- Course: Main course
- Place of origin: Attributed to multiple regions. See the perspectives here
- Region or state: Southeast Asia
- Associated cuisine: Indonesia, Malaysia, Singapore
- Serving temperature: Hot
- Main ingredients: beef or chicken, chili pepper, turmeric, and coconut milk
- Variations: rendang santan, rendang pedas, rendang kuning, rendang hitam, rendang tok, randang darek, randang pasisia
- Similar dishes: basmah, kerutuk, kalio, beef fry, bafad

Rendang (Note: Jawi script: رندڠ. In Za'aba spelling: rěndang. Malay pronunciation: [rənˈdaŋ]) is a stir-fried meat dish or dry curry made of meat stewed in coconut milk and spices, widely popular across Indonesia, Malaysia, Singapore, Brunei, and the southern parts of the Philippines, where each version is considered local cuisine. It refers to both a cooking method of frying and the dish cooked in that way. The process involves slowly cooking meat in spiced coconut milk in an uncovered pot or pan until the oil separates, allowing the dish to fry in its own sauce, coating the meat in a rich, flavorful glaze.

Rooted in Malay and Minangkabau, rendang developed at the cultural crossroads of the Malacca Strait. The dish carries strong Indian influences, as many of its key ingredients are staples in Indian cooking. The introduction of chili peppers by the Portuguese through the Columbian exchange after the capture of Malacca in 1511, played a key role in the evolution of rendang. Malay and Minangkabau traders frequently carried rendang as provisions, allowing the dish to travel naturally through cultural exchange between the Sumatra and Malay Peninsula. In 20th century, the deeply rooted migratory tradition of the Minangkabau people further maintained and contributed to the dish's spread, as they introduced Minang-style rendang to the various places they settled.

As a signature dish in Southeast Asian Muslim cuisines—Malay, Minangkabau (as samba randang), and Moro (as riyandang)—rendang is traditionally served at ceremonial occasions and festive gatherings, such as wedding feasts and Hari Raya (Eid al-Fitr and Eid al-Adha). Nowadays, it is commonly served at food stalls and restaurants as a side dish with rice. In 2009, Malaysia recognized rendang as a heritage food. Indonesia granted rendang cultural heritage status in 2013 and officially declared it one of its national dishes in 2018.

== Etymology and definitions ==
Both the Kamus Besar Bahasa Indonesia and Kamus Dewan define rendang as meat cooked with spices and coconut milk until completely dry; rendang is also a verb for the action of frying in a pan with or without oil (only in Kamus Dewan). Food historian Khir Johari explains that rendang had a broader meaning for frying in general before the prevalence of goreng. For instance, Munshi Abdullah in his 1838 travelogue to Kelantan described the people of Terengganu enjoying rendang pisang (fried banana fritters) — what the Malays now called goreng pisang or pisang goreng.

A 1960 article from Azizah Ja'afar in Berita Harian's Dewan Wanita section (Note: Azizah Ja'afar was head of the Rural Industrial Development Authority's Taman Asuhan Wanita who compiled terms that according to her were used at the Sekolah Mentadbir Rumah Tangga in Johor Bahru and at the Taman Asuhan Wanita in Kuala Lumpur.) lists rendang as "frying with a generous amount of oil", similar to merendang pisang or jemput-jemput (fried fritters), where the things being fried would float in the hot oil. This distinguishes rendang from goreng, which involves little to no oil, as seen in dishes like nasi goreng or mi goreng. Additionally, "rendang" is also the name of a traditional Malay dish known for its rich, spicy flavors, such as rendang santan (meat cooked in coconut milk), and rendang pedas (spiced meat).

The meanings of rendang from 17th-century Malay wordlists.
Year	Author	Description
1623	C. Wiltens, and S. Danckaerts	to fry in butter or oil, to fry, to fricassee
1677	F. Gueynier	to fry in a pan, to fricassee, to sauté

Linguist Tom G. Hoogervorst's etymological research traces rendang back to the 17th-century Malay wordlists. The name rendang comes from the frying process; by the late 19th century, rendang was associated more specifically with a type of dry curry by British colonial officials in Malaya, where it is noted that Malays distinguished rendang as a dry curry and gulai as a wet curry. In olden times, rendang was often translated to English as "fried meat" or "dry curry".

Rendang entered Oxford English Dictionary through Malay and Indonesian rendang which also cognates with Minangkabau randang. Gusti Asnan notes that the earliest recorded mention of randang in the Minangkabau context appears in J.L. van der Toorn's Minangkabau-Malay-Dutch dictionary published in 1891. This word in turn comes from marandang, which means cooking food slowly until the food becomes dry. The Minangkabau people brought rendang as a provision because of its ability to last a long time when moving to other regions.

== History ==
=== Timeline of documentation ===
==== The first known use of the word ====
Food historian Fadly Rahman traces the earliest reference to rendang to the early 16th-century Malay manuscript Hikayat Amir Hamzah associated with the Malacca Sultanate (Note: In the 15th and 16th centuries, at the height of the Malacca Sultanate's power, its capital became a key Asian port, controlling much of the region along the Malacca Straits (Malay Peninsula and Sumatra).) (1400–1528). Written during the spread of Islam in the Malay world, this adaptation of the Persian Hamzanama was later compiled into Malay and intended to inspire Malacca's soldiers in their fight against the Portuguese in 1511. In Malay version, there mentioned the words "rendang" and "merendang" (roasting) which is quoted as follows:

...Khoja Buzurjumhur Hakim pun pergi pula ke kedai orang merendang daging kambing, lalu ia berkata ‘beri apalah daging kambing rendang ini barang segumpal...

Translation:

...Khoja Buzurjumhur Hakim went to the stall where people were merendang (roasting) goat meat and said, 'give me just a piece of this goat meat rendang...'

This passage suggests that merendang refers to a cooking technique, while rendang describes the resulting dish have been part of the Malay vocabulary since the 16th century.

==== Earliest references in European texts ====
The Dutch-Malay dictionary from 1650 lists rendang as the translation for the Dutch word fricasseren, an archaic Dutch spelling of fricassee. (Note: The Vocabularium, ofte Woorden-boek, in 't Duytsch en Maleysch was first compiled and published by Caspar Wiltens and Sebastiaan Danckaerts in 1623. In 1650, it was significantly expanded in Amsterdam by Justus Heurnius, with contributions from Jan van Hasel and Albert Ruyl. Further revisions were made by Frederik Gueynier in Batavia in 1677, and it was updated again by Petrus van der Vorm in 1708, also in Batavia.)

Hoogervorst's research, traces the modern term rendang back to the Malay-Dutch dictionary first compiled in Ambon and published by Caspar Wiltens and Sebastiaan Danckaert in 1623, where it was defined as "to fry in butter or oil, to fry, to fricassee". The dictionary was expanded and updated multiple times. According to Fadly Rahman, the author of the dictionary attempted to translate rendang using a European dish, something that his readers would be familiar with — fricassee, a French cooking method that involves cutting meat into pieces and braising it.

==== As a tradition in royal Malay banquets ====
Khir Johari notes that rendang tumis is mentioned in the Hikayat Hang Tuah, a classic Malay literary masterpiece from around the 17th-century. Another manuscript, Hikayat Awang Sulung Merah Muda, reflects 18th-century life and cooking traditions. In the narration, a prince hunts and captures a pelanduk (mouse deer), which is then prepared in various styles — tumis, rendang, and gulai. Tumis refers to a dish that is more like soup, while rendang resembles the slow-cooked dish we know today. These manuscripts offer a glimpse into the Malay cuisine of the 17th and 18th centuries.

Historical records from the 19th century, including newspaper reports and travelogues, often described the key ingredients of rempah (spice paste) used in rendang, as well as its regional variations. Renowned for his refined taste and hospitality, Sultan Abu Bakar of Johor frequently hosted lavish banquets at his Istana Besar in Johor Bahru. (Note: By the 19th century, much of the Malay Peninsula was under British control. However, Johor remained independent under Sultan Abu Bakar, who maintained the state's autonomy through strategic ties with European aristocrats.) In 1873, J.F.A. McNair described a royal Malay banquet featuring dishes such as rendang tenggiri and rendang chinchang Plentong. In 1881, when King David Kalākaua of Hawaii visited Johor, Sultan Abu Bakar served rendang tenggiri as part of the royal reception.

==== Made popular through cookbooks and newspapers ====
By the early 20th century, rendang recipes began appearing in published cookbooks and newspapers across British Malaya and the Dutch East Indies. On 2 February 1917, Soenting Melajoe featured an article by Datoek Soetan Maharadja, noting that Europeans residing in Palembang, Batavia, and Kupang had written to Minangkabau women, sending money through the magazine's editor to request the preparation and delivery of “rendang Alam Minangkabau”. The "Mem's" Own Cookery Book: 420 Tried and Economical Recipes for Malaya (1920) by Mrs. Kinsey, published in Singapore, included a recipe for "rundang" that used curry powder and could be served with spaghetti. (Note: The "Mem's" Own Cookery Book was first published in 1920 by Mrs. Kinsey, wife of British colonial official William Edward Kinsey, who was based in Malaya. In the preface, she notes that she tested the recipes in Seremban, Negeri Sembilan between 1915 and 1919. The cookbook features dishes like rendang, reflecting the flavors that were familiar to the British colonial palate.) In 1936, R.A. Kardinah's Cooking Guide for Ladies, published in Batavia, featured a chicken rendang recipe that emphasized slow cooking, though it adapted traditional ingredients.

==== Contemporary era ====
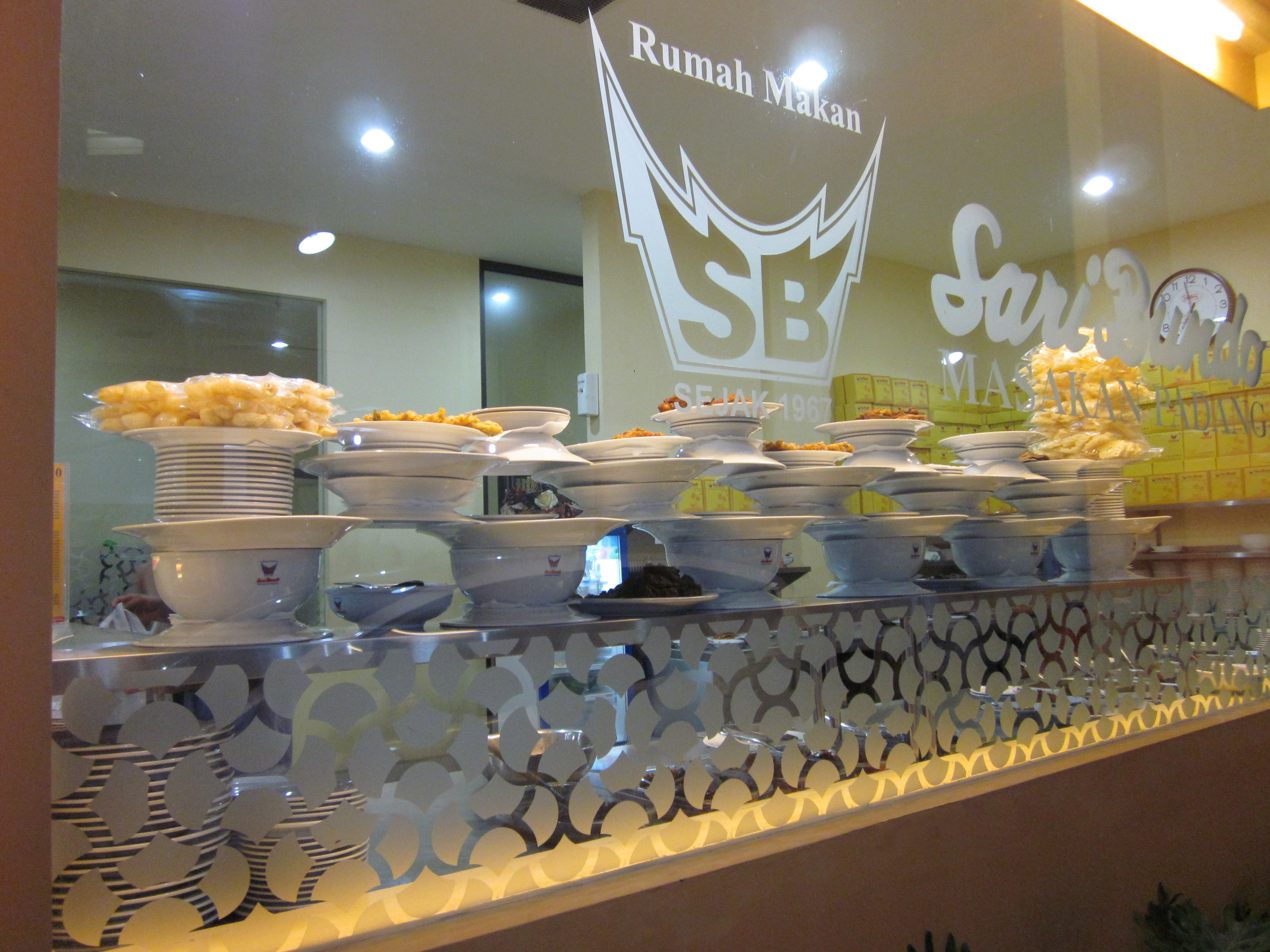
"Padang restaurant" in Surakarta

In Indonesia, rendang is mainly associated with Minangkabau. The popularity of rendang grew with the presence of Minangkabau-style lepau (food stalls) in areas where Minangkabau migrants settled. Their presence in new areas played a significant role in popularizing rendang as a signature dish of West Sumatra. Today, rendang stands as the iconic menu item in Minangkabau restaurants, often accompanied by other meat-based dishes.

In Malaysia and Singapore, rendang is often paired with iconic dishes such as nasi lemak — a national favorite — or lemang, Malay glutinous rice cooked in bamboo, particularly during festivals like Hari Raya. However, rendang has also become a staple in Malay eateries. It even features on the menus of international restaurants, showcasing its enduring appeal and cultural significance.

=== Theories on origin ===
==== From India ====
Rendang, often regarded as an exclusive Malay, Minangkabau dish, is heavily influenced by Indian cuisine. Many of its ingredients, such as cardamom, coriander, garlic, shallots, chili, ginger, galangal, lemongrass, bay leaves, tamarind, and turmeric, are staples in Indian cooking. Winarno and Agustinah believe rendang may have been inspired by curry, a dish combining meat and spices in North India. Indian traders who traveled to West Sumatra brought their culinary traditions with them, possibly influencing the development of rendang. It likely traces its roots to Indian merchants, though it has undergone multiple layers of evolution over time. During this period, Malaysia and Indonesia had yet to emerge as distinct geographical entities, resulting in a deep shared culinary and cultural history.

==== From West Sumatra ====
Gusti Asnan notes that the earliest mention of randang in Minangkabau culture appears in J.L. van der Toorn's dictionary from 1891. However, he believes that it had been familiar to the Minangkabau people long before this record.

Reconstruction of randang history by Gusti Asnan (Note: Gusti Asnan acknowledges that his claims about the history of rendang are interpretative, where it is a normal part of historical reconstruction and an essential aspect of historical research methods.)
Randang has been known to Minang	Argumentation
since the 16th century (or earlier)	based on the migration of Minang people to Peninsular Malaysia
since the 1830s	based on the information in H.J.J.L. Ridder de Stuers' report (Note: However, Fadly Rahman’s analysis of de Stuers' book found no explicit mention of rendang. The Dutch record describes a "blackened, charred dish".)

Fadly Rahman inferred that rendang is closely associated with the Islamic tradition, the migratory culture, and the commercial ethics of the Minangkabau people. An early reference to “Rendang Minang”, a dish renowned for its ability to last for months and favored by migrants and traders, dates to 1917.

=== Possible Portuguese influences ===
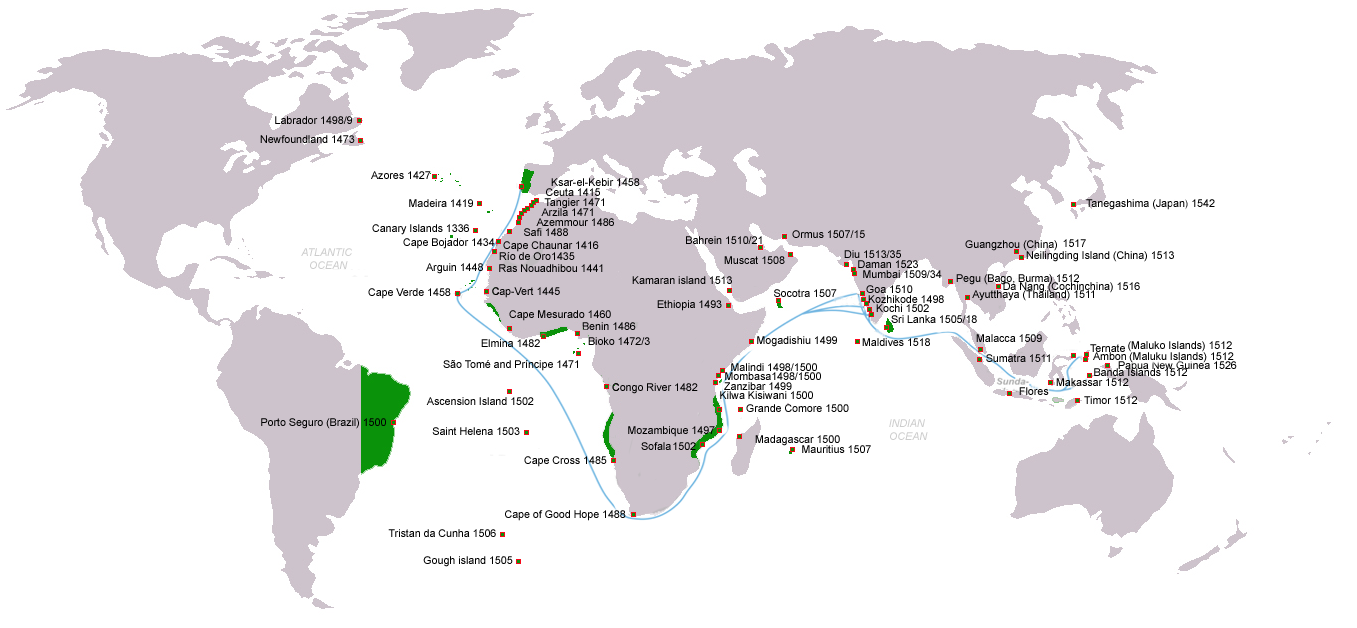
Goa, Malacca, and Macau were key stops along the Portuguese spice trade routes (in blue) in the 16th and 17th centuries. The Portuguese also introduced chili to Asia, and these quickly became integral to local cuisines.

According to culinary historian Janet P. Boileau, Portuguese cooks had a unique method of frying meat after braising, unlike the Arab technique of frying before boiling. This approach, adopted by Luso-Asian cooks, may have influenced local culinary practices including rendang. When the Portuguese ruled Malacca (1511–1641), they brought various cultural and culinary influences to the Malay Peninsula and neighboring Sumatra. Portuguese cuisine introduced preservation techniques and terms like acar, belacan, baulu, and mentega.

After Malacca fell to the Dutch, the Kristang community — descendants of Malaccan Portuguese settlers — faced economic challenges and sought cost-effective ways to prepare food. They adopted techniques similar to those used by their counterparts in Portuguese Macau, such as frying meat with minimal water until it blackened, resembling bafado. (Bafado is derived from the term abafado, which means "a dish of stew".) This method led to the creation of the Kristang version of dry beef curry and then spread to the Malay people and reached the Minangkabau.

In the early 16th century, the arrival of Tomé Pires and the writings of João de Barros marked the beginning of Portuguese influence in West Sumatra during the Portuguese control of Malacca. This contact likely introduced culinary elements such as Abafado, meaning “a dish of stew,” which evolved into bafado and was later adapted as balado in Minangkabau, which has since become a widely recognized culinary term in Minangkabau cuisine. With both bafado and balado serving food preservation purposes, and considering the movement of Minangkabau traders across the Malacca Strait from Sumatra to Peninsula Malaysia, it reflects Luso's culinary influence may be spread due to human traffic activities between two regions.

== Cultural significance ==
Rendang was officially recognized by Malaysia as a National Heritage food in 2009, celebrated for its rich diversity across the country. Rendang campur was declared in 2012. Randang from West Sumatra was granted cultural heritage status in 2013 by the Indonesian government. Rendang holds a special place in Malay and Minangkabau society, celebrated for its deep cultural significance and often reserved for special occasions such as Eid, weddings, and important gatherings. In villages, making rendang is a communal effort, with large amounts of meat being cooked in a giant cast-iron cauldron. During the final stage, people work together, stirring with a wooden oar-like spatula for hours to ensure even cooking. This slow frying removes moisture, allowing the meat to absorb the spices while preventing burning or breaking.

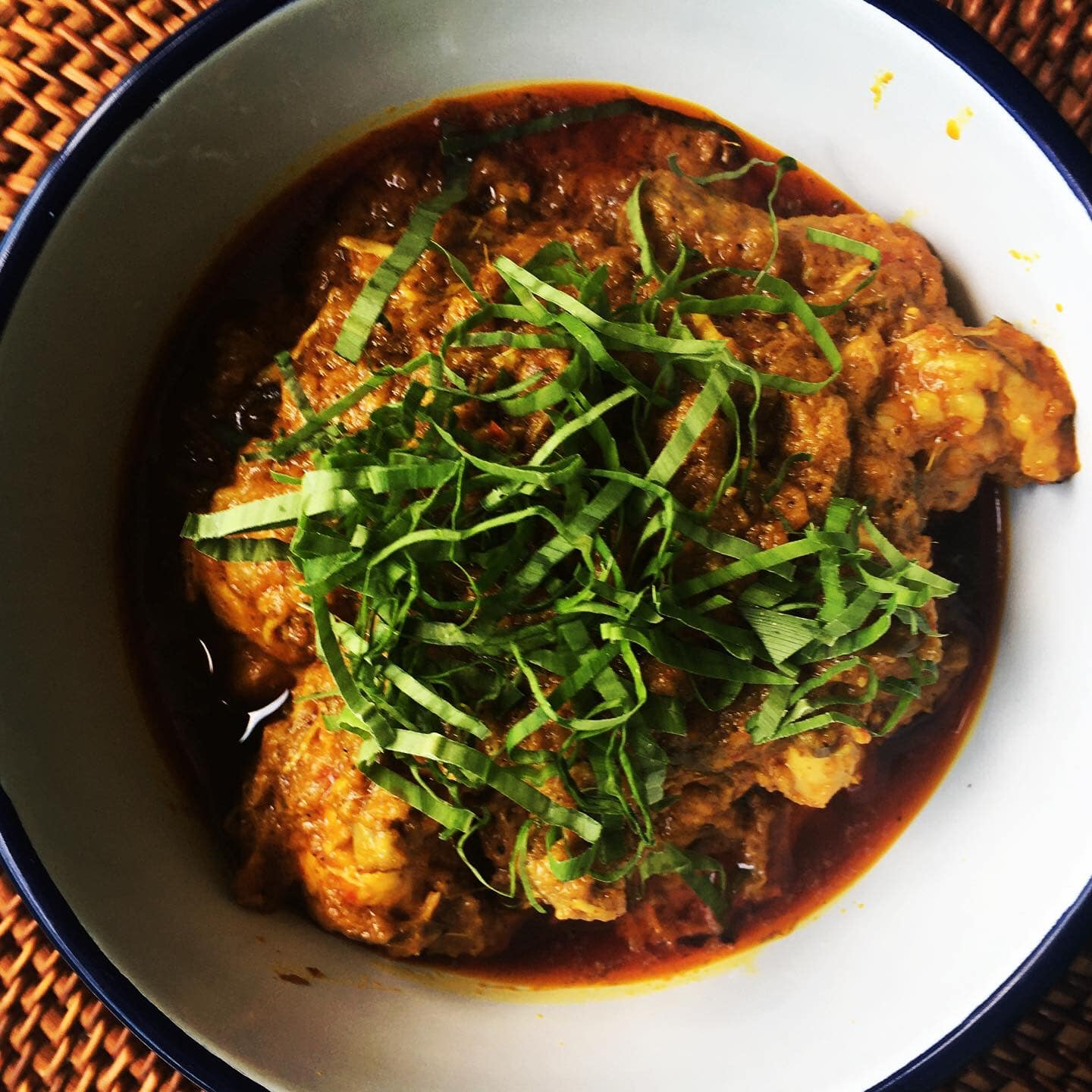
Oil gives rendang its signature glossy finish. Turmeric leaves are sliced as garnishes.

The essence of rendang lies in its meticulous cooking process, where meat or chicken is slow-cooked with fresh coconut milk, aromatic spices, and herbs. This harmonious blend of ingredients represents unity and balance within the Malay community. Beyond its exquisite taste, rendang embodies hospitality, cultural pride, and a connection to heritage. Malay food traditions make the most of coconuts, knowing that the best coconut milk comes from mature coconuts. People with coconut palms could easily choose the right coconut for rendang the next day. Oil plays an important role in the dish's presentation, adding a glossy finish whether used for sautéing or naturally released during cooking.

Rendang is traditionally associated with festive occasions and ceremonial meals. For example, it took center stage in the royal celebration during the Santapan Nasi Berastakona at Istana Iskandariah following the Perak Sultan's coronation. Various styles of rendang were served alongside layers of yellow, white, and black glutinous rice in an intricately carved silver octagonal vessel called the Astakona, symbolizing sustenance and harmony. Notable Perak variations of rendang such as rendang tok, rendang ayam, and rendang udang, were thoughtfully prepared and arranged around the rice centerpiece, showcasing the dish's ceremonial importance.

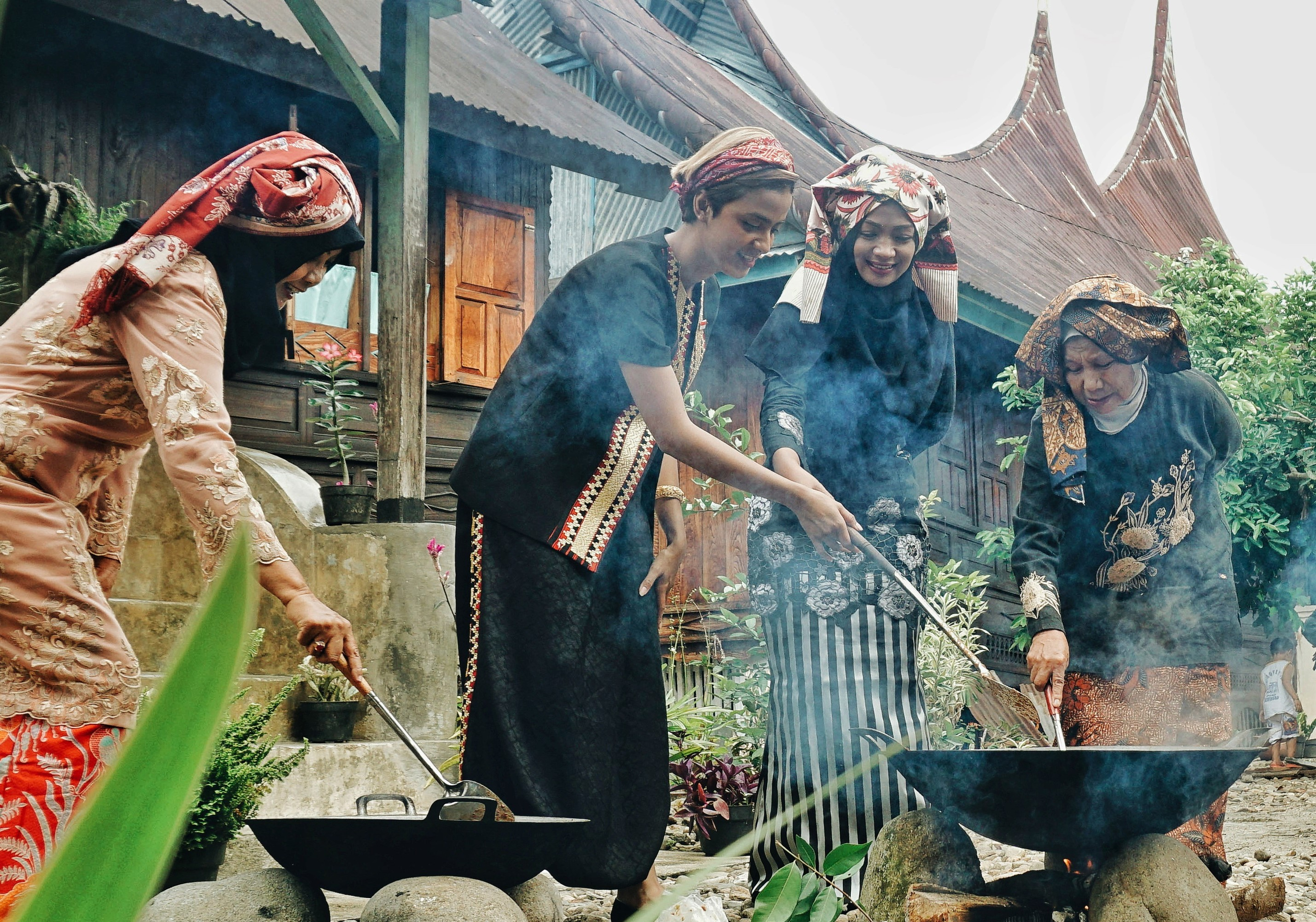
A group of women preparing randang in West Sumatra.

In Minangkabau culture, there are three types of food: makanan adat (traditional ceremonial food), samba adat (ceremonial dishes), and makan beradat (formal dining traditions). Rendang belongs to the category of samba adat, which is essential for traditional ceremonies. One key example is rendang daging kerbau (buffalo meat rendang), which symbolizes legitimacy in cultural rituals. Buffalo meat is particularly significant and cannot be substituted, as it is tied to the recognition of a tribal leader's title.

Rendang, a celebrated dish from the Minangkabau region, is tied to a folk tale about Princess Puti Ranti, a humble and skilled cook. In a royal cooking competition, jealous rivals sabotaged her gulai, causing it to blacken. Despite this, the dish turned out delicious, and Puti Ranti won the contest. The delighted king named the dish rendang, combining her name and that of her future fiancé, Danggala. This story reflects Rendang's significance as a symbol of heritage and pride in Minangkabau culture.

Each ingredient in rendang is reported to carry philosophical symbolism in Minangkabau culture and represents its key values and principles that reflect the way of life and social structure of the people.

Rendang has a special position in the culture of the Minangkabau people. The Minangkabau people are famous for their Merantau culture, which is to leave their hometowns in West Sumatra. Minang people in the land area used to travel to the Strait of Malacca to Singapore which took about a month through the river, because along the way there were no villages, the nomads prepared a long-lasting food supply, namely Rendang.

CNN International conducted a worldwide poll in 2011; it named rendang as the world's most delicious dish, ranking first among 50 dishes. Just prior to that ranking, the staff had put rendang at number eleven. The published article called rendang an "Indonesian dish". According to Fadly Rahman, many Indonesians don't just see this ranking as proof of rendang's exceptional taste; rather, it has been widely used by the government and culinary communities to reinforce that rendang is an Indonesian dish, not Malaysian. However, what often goes unnoticed is how this claim transforms rendang from a symbol of culinary excellence into a dish laden with political significance.

In 2018, a judge on MasterChef UK sparked controversy by criticizing a contestant's rendang for not being "crispy enough". The remark drew strong reactions from Malaysians, Singaporeans, and Indonesians, leading to widespread debate. In response, some local eateries even created their own crispy versions of rendang.

=== Philosophy ===
Rendang holds deep philosophical significance for the Minang people of West Sumatra, embodying the values of deliberation and consensus (musyawarah dan mufakat). It is rooted in four key ingredients, each symbolizing an essential pillar of Minangkabau society. Dagiang (beef) represents the niniak mamak (traditional tribal leaders), karambia (coconut) symbolizes the cadiak pandai (intellectuals), lado (chili) stands for the alim ulama (religious scholars who strictly uphold teachings), and cook (spices) represents the broader Minangkabau community.

Symbolism behind randang ingredients in Minangkabau culture
Ingredient	Symbolism	Description
meat (dagiang)	niniak mamak, datuak, or pangulu	all three terms refer to tribal or community leaders who are believed to bring prosperity to future generations. They are also seen as unifying figures for all members of the community.
coconut milk (karambia)	cadiak pandai	These intellectuals foster unity among groups and individuals, resolve conflicts, and act as protectors. They also serve as lawmakers for Minangkabau tribes.
chili (lado)	alim ulama	Religious scholars symbolize firmness and dedication in teaching and upholding religious values.
spice mixture (pemasak)	dubalang, manti, or bundo kanduang	In Minangkabau society, every individual has a distinct role, each contributing to the promotion and preservation of Minangkabau culture. This collective participation is a cornerstone of social life.

The Minangkabau philosophy in cooking rendang includes three main values: patience, wisdom, and perseverance. The cooking process that requires careful selection of ingredients reflects the good values of the human being.

== Composition and cooking method ==
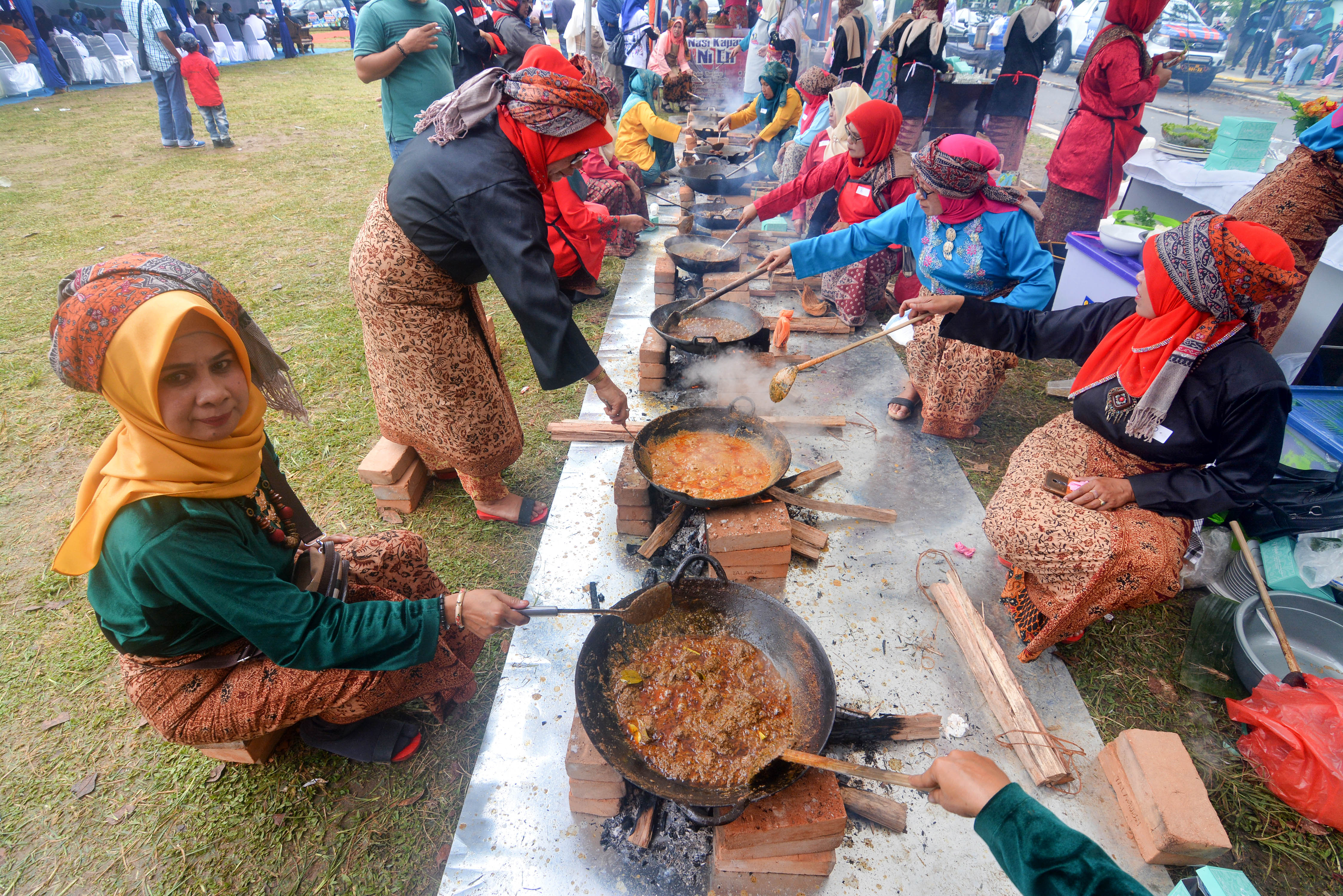
A rendang cooking festival in West Sumatra

Rendang is most often described as meat slow-cooked in coconut milk and spices until it becomes tender. If cooked properly, dry rendang can last for as long as four weeks. Prior to refrigeration technology, this style of cooking enabled preservation of large amounts of meat in the tropical climate, and therefore became a popular cooking technique. Its durability is one of the reasons that today, prepackaged rendang is sent as food aid relief for natural disaster survivors in Indonesia. The preferred cut of beef for rendang is lean meat of the rear leg; i.e. topside or round beef, which is considered perfect for slow cooking.

Rendang is rich in spices. Along with the main meat ingredient, rendang uses coconut milk and a paste of mixed ground spices, including ginger, galangal, turmeric leaves, lemongrass, garlic, shallots, chillis and other spices. This spice mixture is called pemasak in Minangkabau. The spices, garlic, shallot, ginger and galangal used in rendang have antimicrobial properties and serve as natural organic preservatives. Although some culinary experts describe rendang as a curry, the dish is usually not considered as such in Indonesia or Malaysia since it is richer and contains less liquid than is normal for curries.

Traditionally the term rendang does not refer to a certain type of dish. The verb merendang actually refers to a method of slow cooking; continuously churning the ingredients in a pot or frying pan, on a small fire, until all of the liquids evaporate and the meat is well done. Traditional Padang rendang takes hours to cook. Cooking rendang involves pounding and grinding ingredients as well as slow cooking, and so is time-consuming and requires patience. The meat pieces are slowly cooked in coconut milk and spices until almost all the liquid is gone, allowing the meat to become tender and absorb the condiments. The cooking process changes from boiling to frying, as the liquid evaporates and the coconut milk turns to coconut oil. Cooking the meat until tender with almost all the liquid evaporated requires great care, keeping it from getting burnt. Because of its generous use of numerous spices, rendang has a complex and unique taste.

Rendang is often served with steamed rice, ketupat (a compressed rice cake) or lemang (glutinous rice cooked in bamboo tubes), accompanied with vegetable side dishes such as boiled cassava leaf, cubadak (young jackfruit gulai), cabbage gulai and lado (red or green chilli pepper sambal).

=== Cooking process - merendang ===
Azizah Ja'afar describes the cooking process of rendang (merendang) as involves simmering the meat in spiced coconut milk in an uncovered pot or pan until the coconut milk's oil separates and coats the meat, giving it a rich, glossy finish. With a slow fire and constant stirring, it takes around three hours for five kilograms of meat to reduce from a broth (when all the ingredients come together in a wok). From there, it requires an additional two hours before reaching the traditional rendang consistency.

Three stages of merendang cooking
Stages	Description
First stage	The meat slowly simmers in a rich blend of coconut milk and spices, starting with a gentle boil in the creamy broth.
Second stage	As the liquid gradually reduces, the coconut milk releases its natural oils, causing the cooking process to shift from simmering to slow frying.
Third stage	Over time, the meat deepens in color, frying in its own thickened sauce until it's coated in a dark, flavorful paste.

== Types ==
=== Types of rendang in Malay Peninsula and Singapore ===
Betty Yew's cookbook Rasa Malaysia, published in 1982, features 16 rendang recipes that highlight regional nuances. Rendang can be made with a variety of proteins, including buffalo, chicken, duck, mutton, venison, shellfish, birds, and grasshoppers. Popular regional variations include rendang kerbau (buffalo rendang) from Rembau and rendang udang galah (giant freshwater prawn rendang) from Lenggong. Vegetable ingredients like jackfruit, pucuk teh, pucuk lampin, and pucuk maman (Cleome gynandra) are often added, reflecting the ingenuity of Malay communities in utilizing local resources.

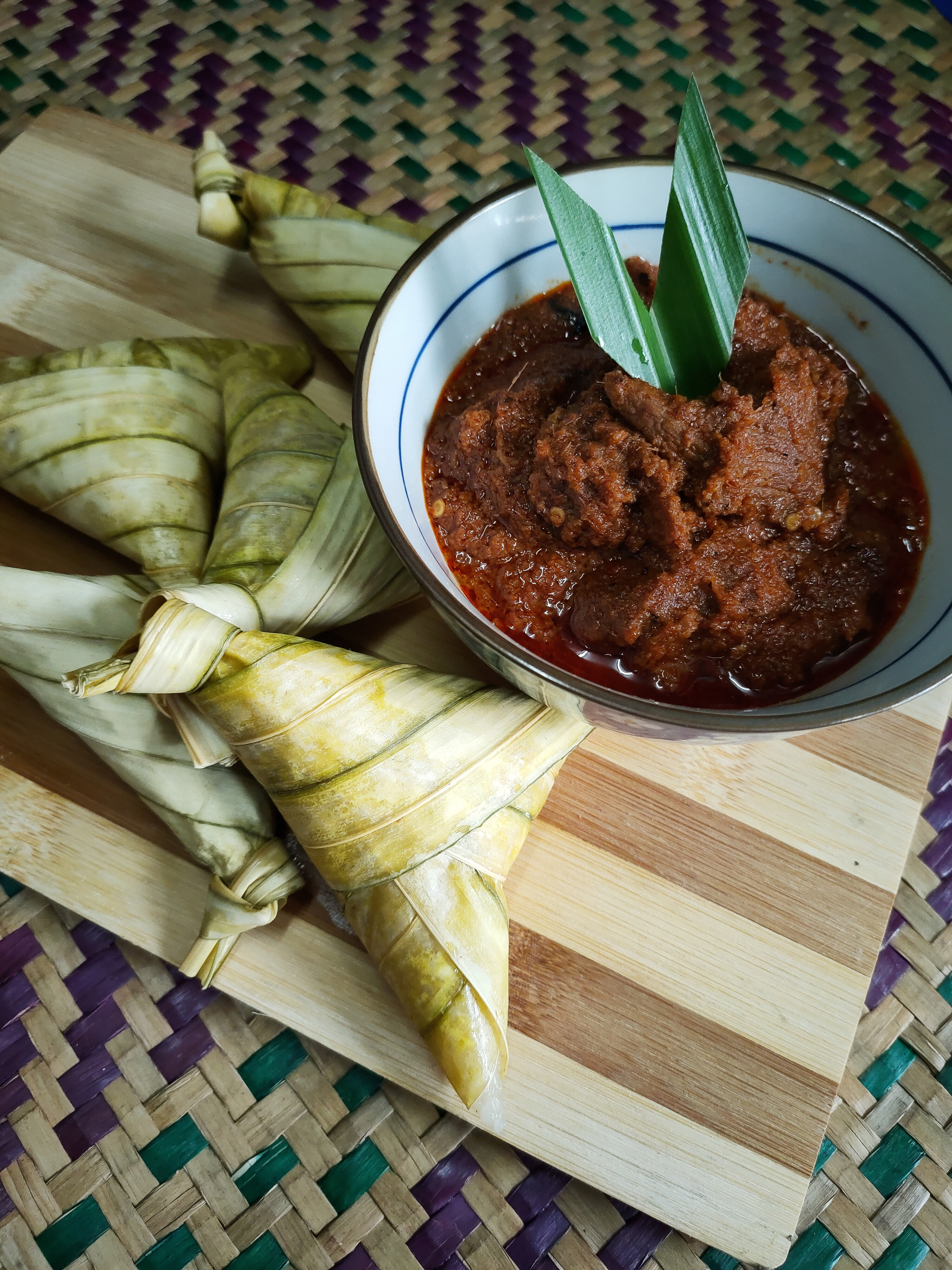
Rendang tok served with ketupat palas.

In Perak, rendang is deeply rooted in royal culinary traditions. Notable varieties include rendang tok, rendang ayam (chicken rendang), and rendang udang (shrimp rendang). Rendang tok, a specialty from Bukit Chandan, is a dry curry made with cubed beef, coconut milk, and a rich blend of spices such as cloves, star anise, cumin, cinnamon, chilies, and turmeric. It is enhanced with pan-toasted desiccated coconut and thin strips of coconut flesh, giving it a unique texture and aroma. The final dish is dark and intensely flavorful. Perak's rendang recipes also incorporate unique ingredients like forest fruits, including kelepong (a seasonal plant from the fig family). In Lenggong, popular rendang varieties include rendang dendeng, and rendang pedas daging dengan lambuk (spicy beef with lambuk yam rendang). There is also rendang daging masak hitam that is commonly served at Malay weddings. This version stands out from other rendang dishes in the region because it's made without coconut milk, giving it a distinct flavor and appearance.

Negeri Sembilan is known for two main types of rendang: rendang kuning (yellow rendang) and rendang hitam (black rendang). Both are cooked until completely dry. Rendang kuning shares ingredients with the region's signature dish, gulai kuning, such as cili api, turmeric, and coconut milk. In Negeri Sembilan, beef is less commonly used due to its higher water content, which makes it harder to achieve the desired dryness. A traditional recipe also features pucuk ubi (young tapioca leaves), cooked until the mixture is dry and the leaves turn a deep brown color. Rendang daun puding is a type of rendang kuning that incorporates daun puding while rendang kacang includes chicken organs and long beans for added flavor and texture. In Tebing Tinggi, Bintong, Perlis, there's a unique dish called rendang serai, where the main ingredient is thinly sliced lemongrass. It's cooked with a blend of ingredients like belimbing buluh (a sour local fruit), coconut milk, kurma spices, onions, and either fresh or dried prawns.

In Malacca, a fiery version called rendang cili api, made with bird's eye chilies, coconut milk, and spices, often features unique ingredients like cockles (rendang kerang). In Johor, the traditional rendang asli includes bird's eye chilies and thick soy sauce for a distinctive flavor profile. Basmah, a dish popular in Penang and Kedah, closely resembles rendang as it also uses coconut milk and toasted coconut gratings. However, it stands out for its use of a greater variety of fresh spices. In Terengganu and Kelantan, a dish called kerutuk is made from meat mixed with spices and cooked until thick, also said to resemble rendang. The Kristang also has their version of dry beef curry.

Among older generations of Singapore Malays, rendang wasn't limited to just the classic meat version either. Variations included cattle liver rendang, pigeon rendang, eel rendang, shellfish rendang, jackfruit rendang (prized for its fibrous, meat-like texture), and banana blossom rendang. Some recipes even incorporated petite potatoes to add a carbohydrate element to balance the dish's rich protein and fat content. For extra depth of flavor, a few tablespoons of kerisik (toasted, grated coconut) could be mixed in. Rendang hijau (green rendang), once a prized dish among the Riau-Singapore nobility, can still be found in the homes of some descendants, though it is becoming increasingly rare.

=== Types of rendang in West Sumatra ===
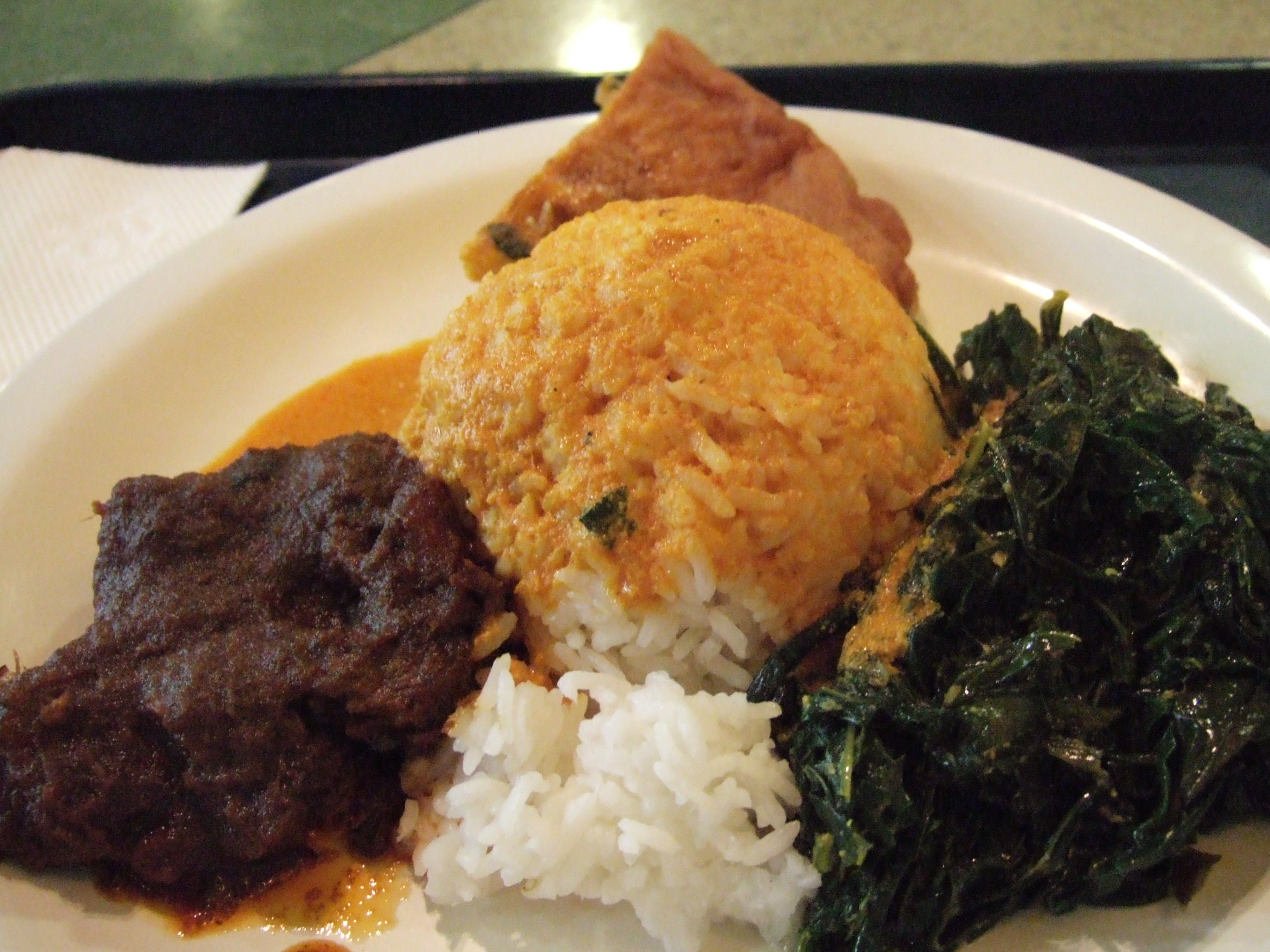
Nasi ramas served with rendang, and other side dishes.

Today, rendang is widely enjoyed beyond ceremonial settings and has become a popular souvenir in Padang. While traditionally made with buffalo meat or beef, rendang now features a variety of ingredients. These include chicken, which cooks faster and is more economical; duck, common in areas like Payakumbuh; goat meat, often enjoyed in Agam; and seafood options like shellfish and salted fish. Other creative versions include randang talua, made with tapioca flour and eggs, and shredded beef or chicken rendang, which resembles meat floss but with thicker fibers.

In Minangkabau, randang is broadly categorized into two styles based on regional influences: randang darek and randang pasisia. These variations reflect the geographical and cultural diversity of the highland (darek) and coastal (pasisia) areas of West Sumatra. Each variation of Rendang highlights the versatility of its signature spices, adapting to the availability of ingredients across different regions.

Two types of Minangkabau randang
Characteristics	Randang Darek	Randang Pasisia
Shape	cut into smaller pieces	cut into larger pieces
Color	long cooking process gives a darker, blackish-brown color	has a lighter brown color due to shorter cooking times
Aroma	smoky, fragrant aroma	aroma of spices, which are more abundant and prominent
Texture	tender, and its bran (caramelized coconut) is crunchy	more tender, with the bran being crunchier and oilier
Flavor	natural ingredients, resulting in a slightly sweet flavor	richer in herbs and spices, creating an aromatic taste

Randang darek focuses on long cooking times, smaller pieces, and a smoky flavor, while randang pasisia highlights spice richness, tenderness, and suitability as a daily dish. Both offer unique qualities that reflect their regional culinary traditions.

== Variations ==
=== Indonesia ===
Variations of Rendang

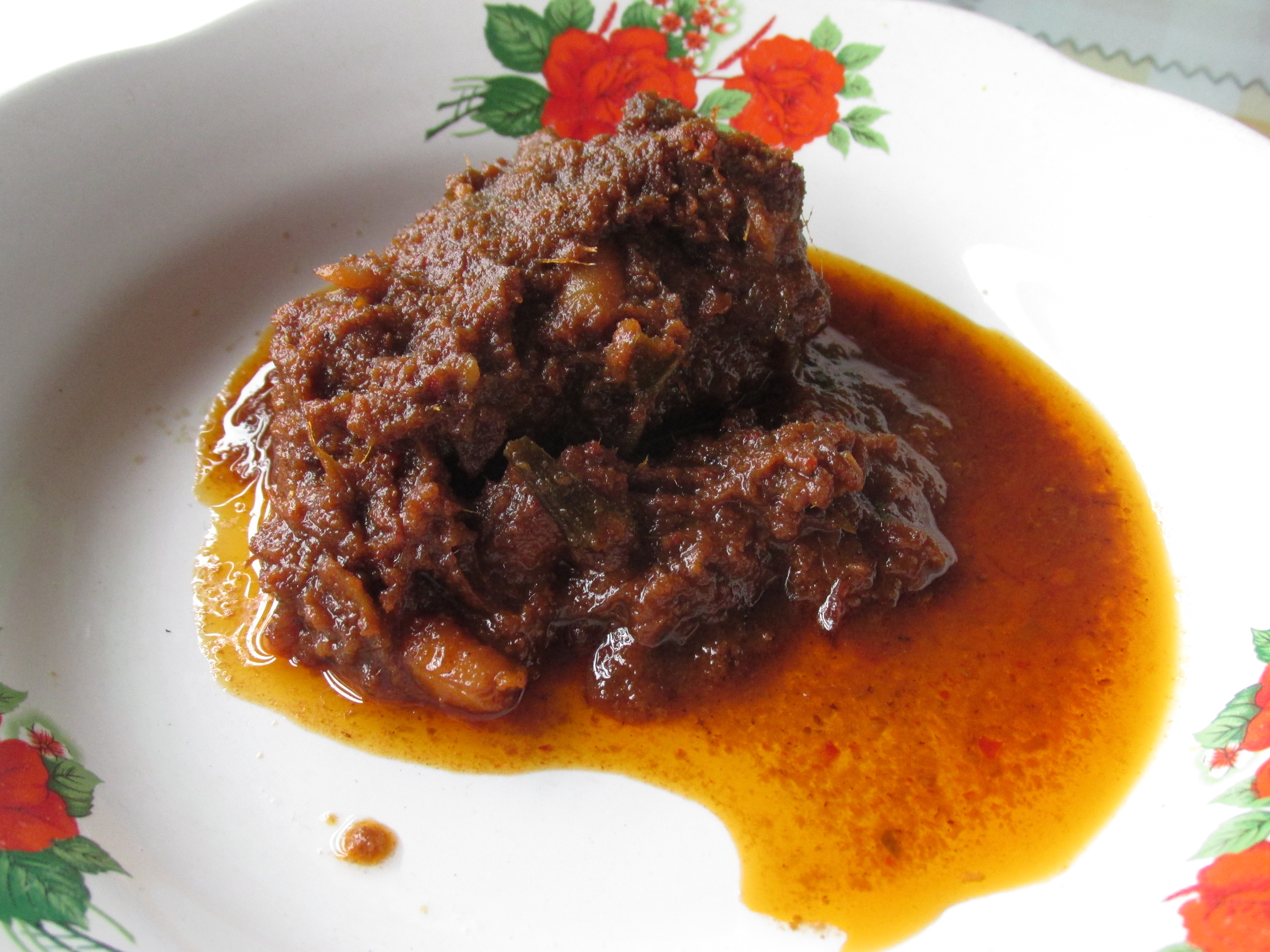
Randang daging or beef rendang

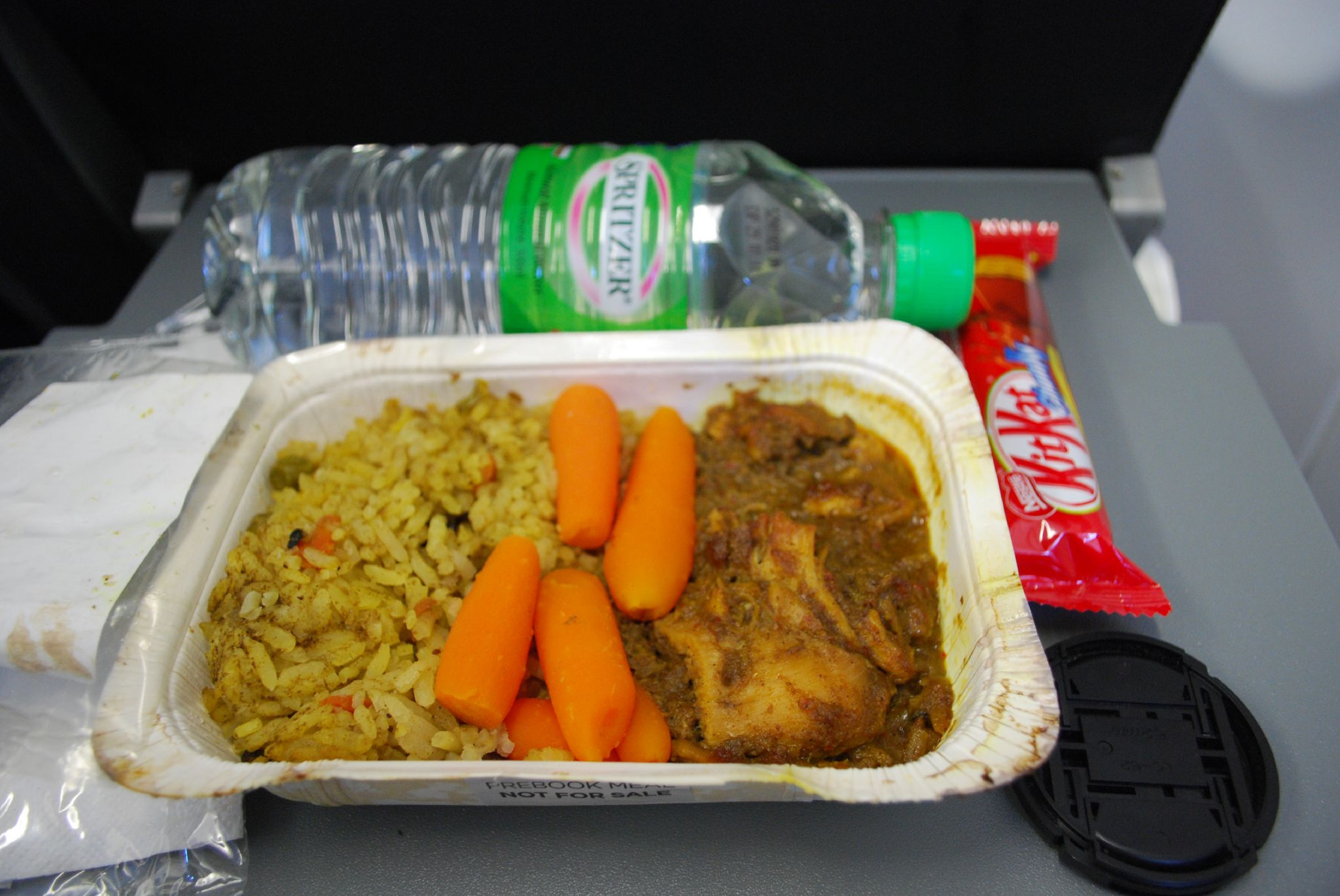
Chicken rendang

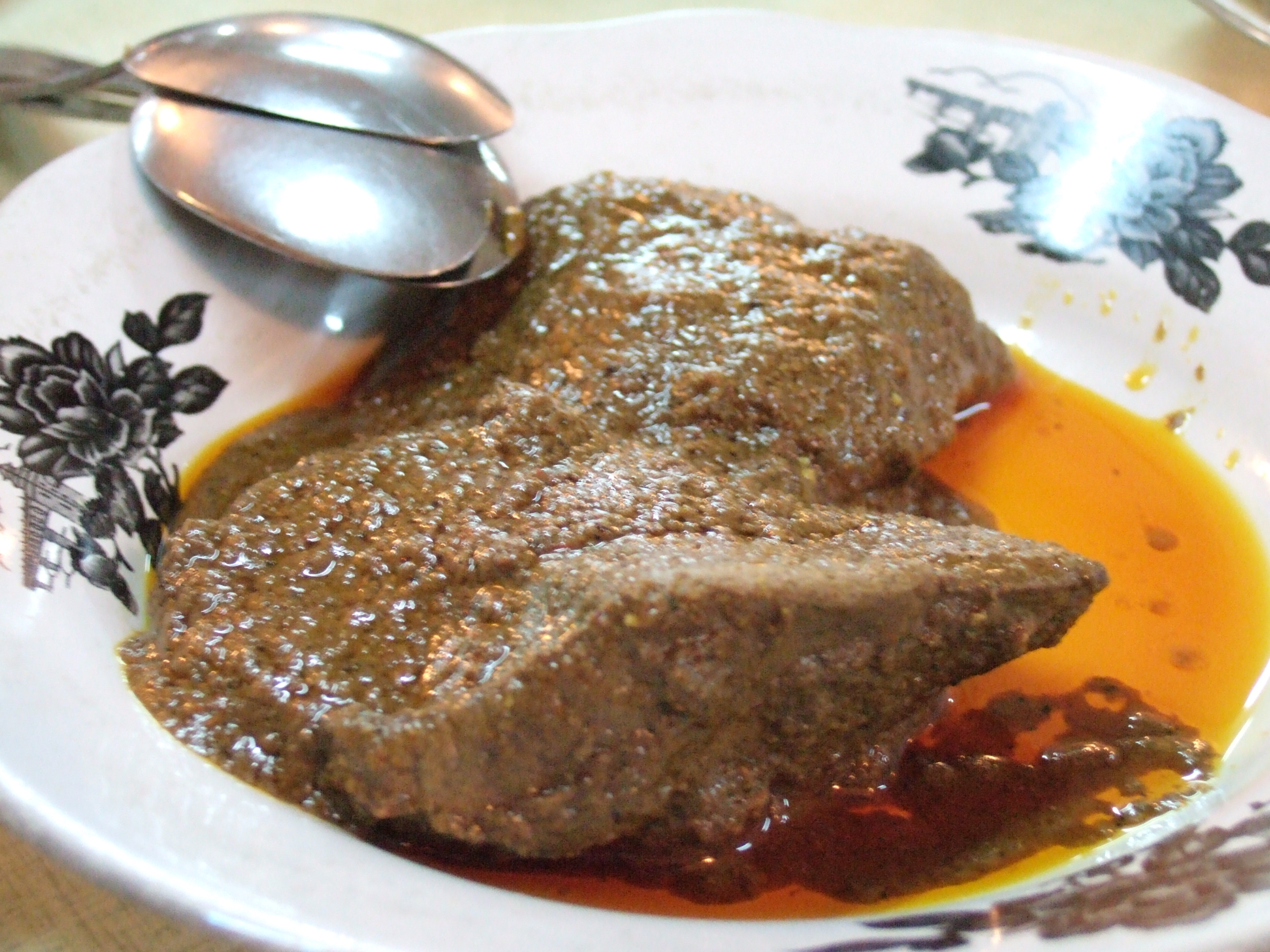
Randang hati or beef liver rendang

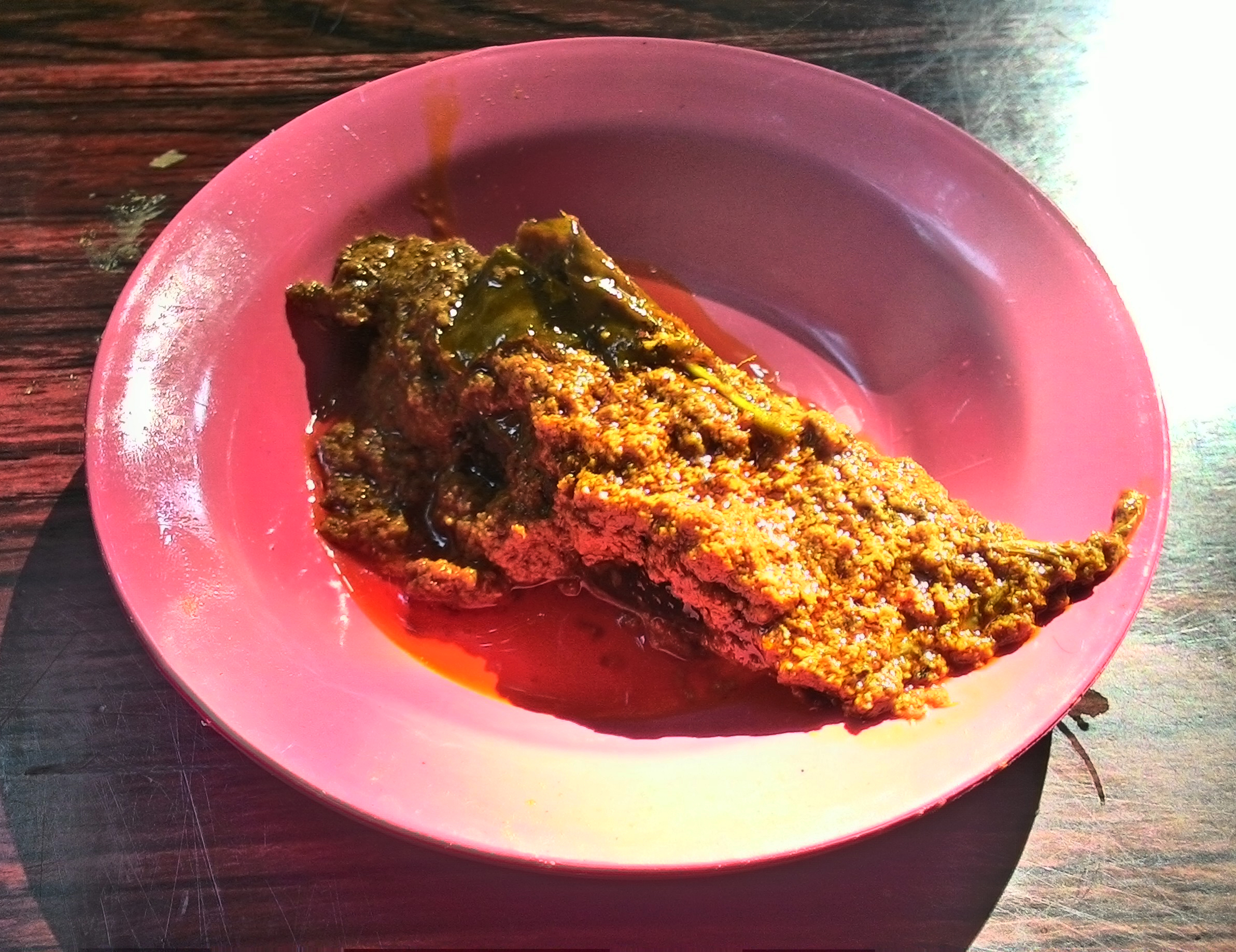
Randang limpo or beef spleen rendang

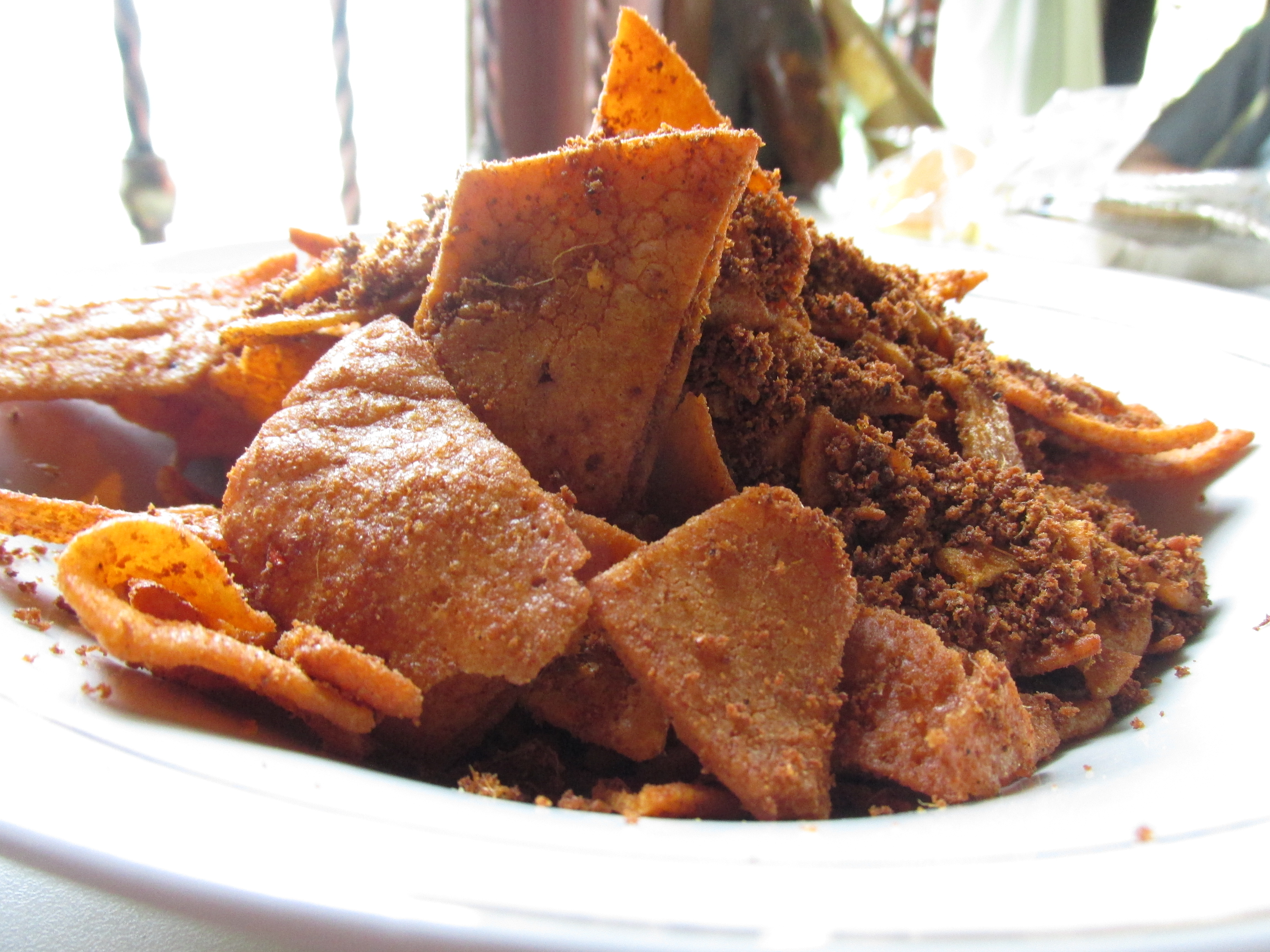
Randang talua kariang or dry egg rendang

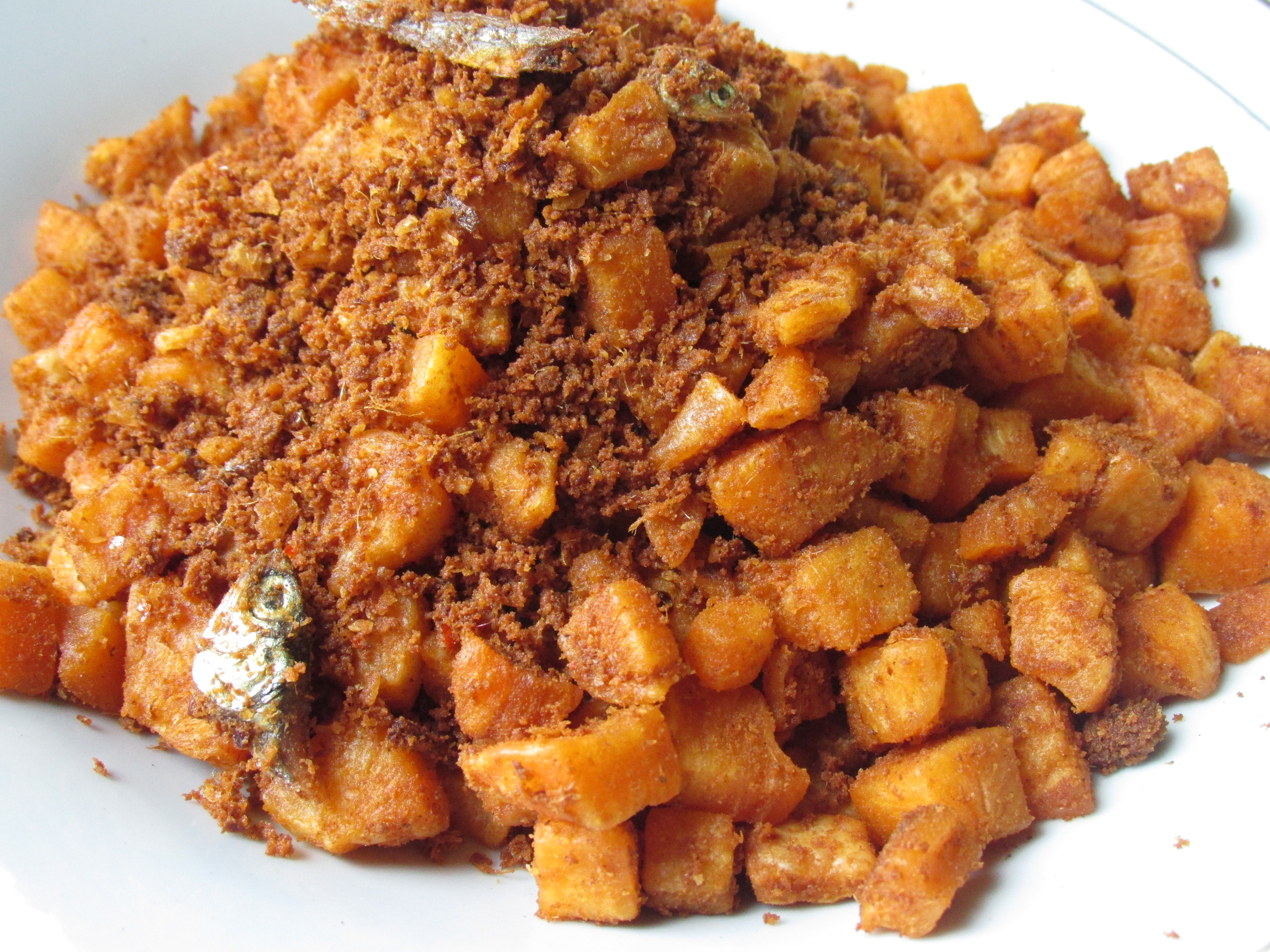
Randang maco or salted fish with diced cassava rendang

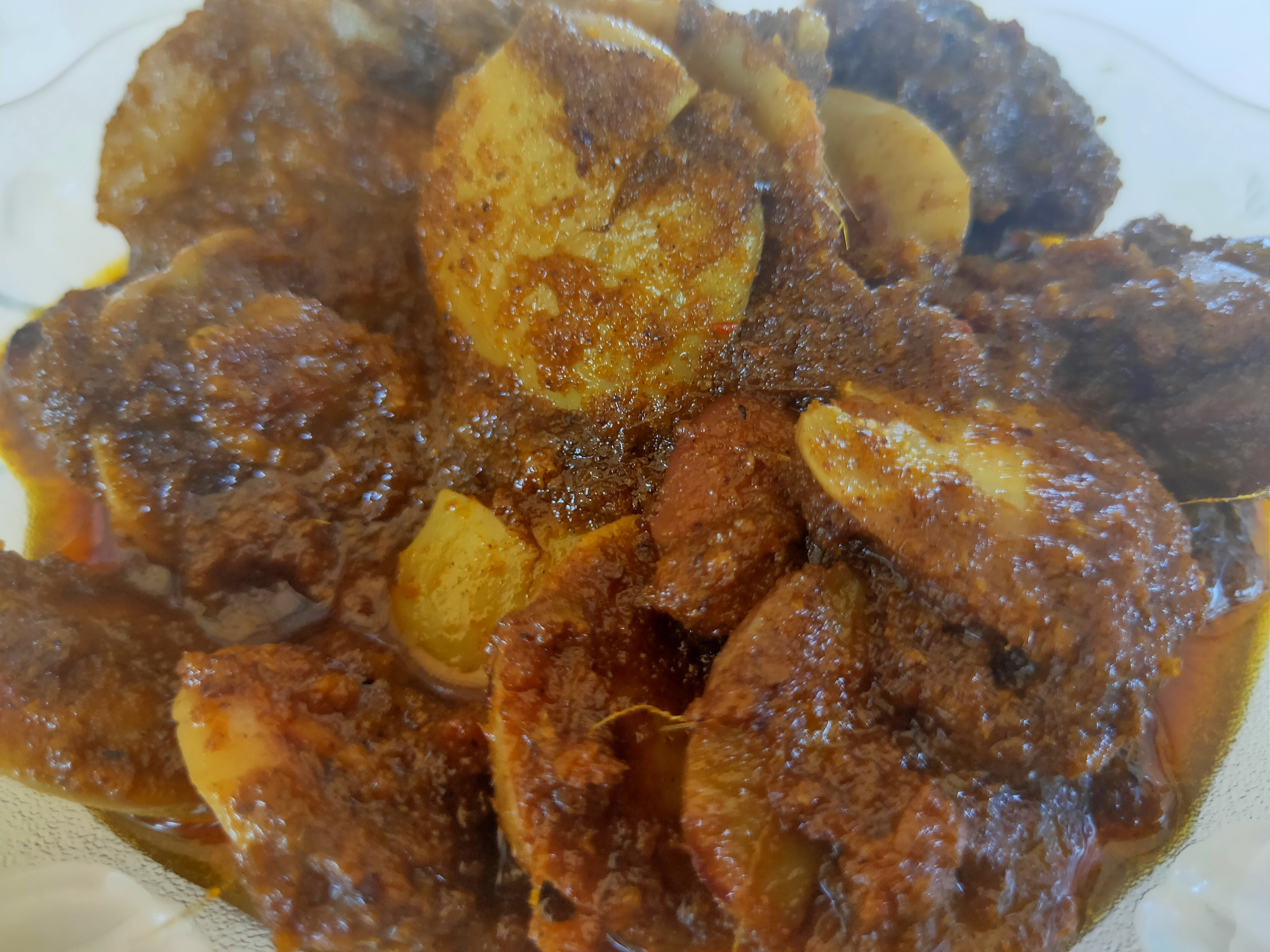
Randang jariang or jengkol rendang

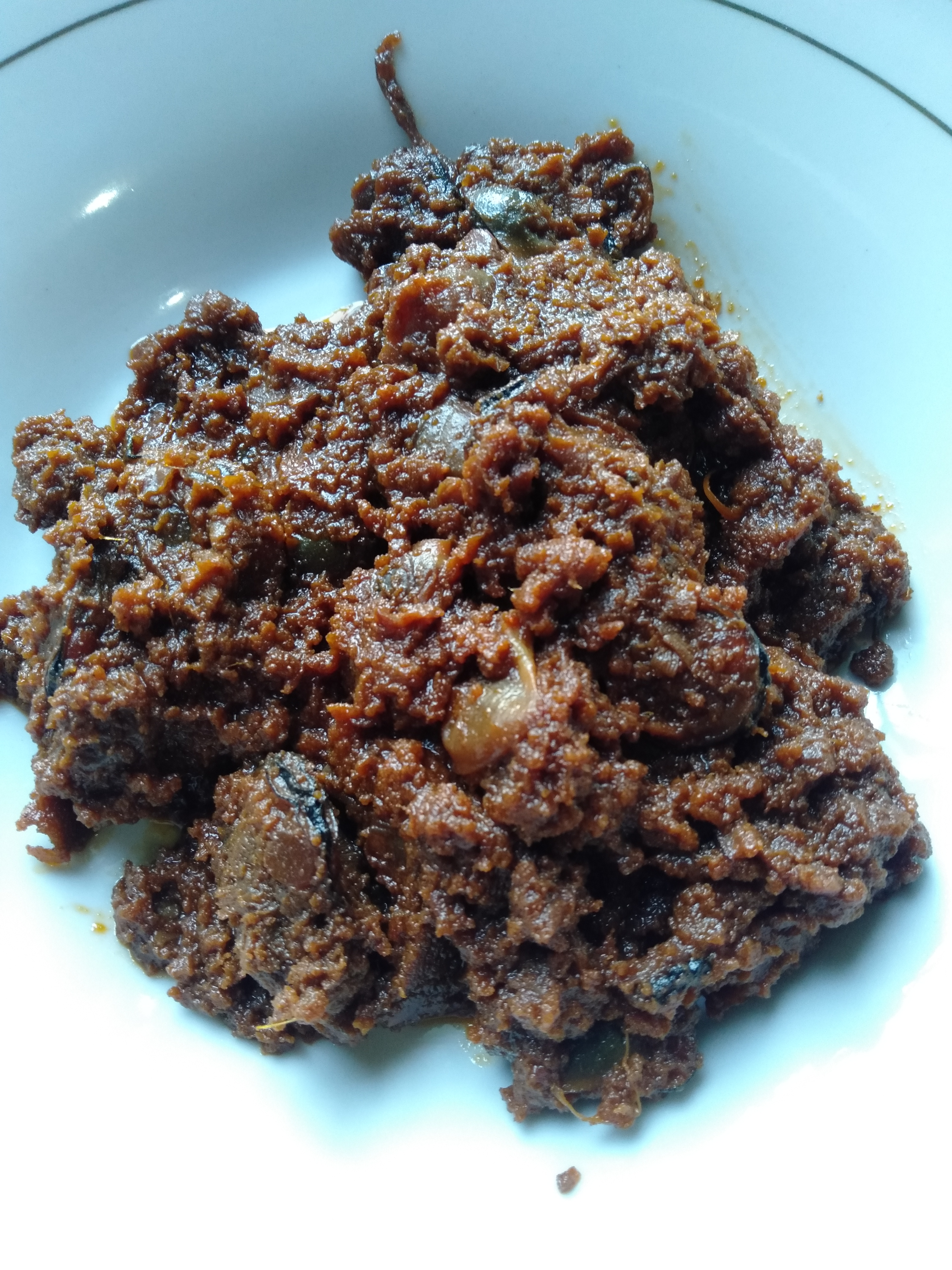
Randang lokan or clam rendang

Rendang is made from beef (or occasionally beef liver, chicken, duck, mutton, water buffalo, or vegetables like jackfruit or cassava). Chicken or duck rendang also contains tamarind and is usually not cooked for as long as beef rendang.

The original Minangkabau rendang has two categories, rendang darek and rendang pesisir. Rendang darek (‘land rendang’) is an umbrella term for dishes from old regions in mountainous areas of the Minangkabau Highlands such as Batusangkar, Agam, Lima Puluh Kota, Payakumbuh, Padang Panjang and Bukittinggi. It mainly consists of beef, offal, poultry products, jackfruit, and many other vegetables and animal products that are found in these places. Rendang pesisir ('coastal rendang') is from the coastal regions of Minangkabau such as Pariaman, Padang, Painan and Pasaman. It mainly consists of seafood, although it is not unusual for it to include beef or water buffalo meat.

Minangkabau Rendang variations:

- Rendang ayam: chicken rendang, speciality of Batusangkar and Bukittinggi.
- Rendang ati ampela: rendang made of chicken innards; liver and gizzard.
- Rendang babat: tripe rendang, made of tripes of cattle.
- Rendang baluik (rendang belut): eel rendang, speciality of Solok. In the Solok dialect, it is also called ‘randang baluk’.
- Rendang bilih (bilis): bilis fish rendang, specialty of Padang Panjang. In Sumatra, ikan bilis refers distinctly to Mystacoleucus padangensis, a small freshwater fish endemic to Sumatra. In other places, bilis might refer to sea anchovy instead.
- Rendang cubadak (rendang nangka): unripe jackfruit rendang, speciality of Payakumbuh.
- Rendang cumi: squid rendang, a seafood variant of rendang usually consumed in coastal area.
- Rendang daging: meat rendang. The most common rendang is made from beef, but may also be from water buffalo, goat, mutton or lamb, speciality of Padang.
- Rendang datuk (rendang kering): dried beef rendang, that instead of using fresh beef cuts, the pieces of meat are dried for four days prior of cooking. Specialty of Muara Enim in South Sumatra.
- Rendang daun kayu (samba buruk): rendang made of various edible leaves, usually leaves of ubi kayu, jirak, mali, rambai, daun arbai, mixed with ikan haruan (snakehead fish), specialty of Payakumbuh.
- Rendang daun pepaya: young papaya leaf rendang.
- Rendang dendeng: Dendeng rendang, thinly sliced dried and fried beef cooked in rendang spice. Also can be made from readily available processed beef jerky.
- Rendang gabus (rendang ikan haruan): Snakehead fish rendang, popular in Payakumbuh.
- Rendang gadih, rendang tumbuk or rendang payakumbuh: Minced beef rendang, tumbuk or pounded beef shaped into balls mixed with coconut, specialty of Payakumbuh, West Sumatra.
- Rendang hati: cow liver rendang, speciality of Minangkabau.
- Rendang ikan asap (rendang ikan salai): smoked fish rendang, usually made of smoked ikan pari or ray fish, specialty of Minangkabau.
- Rendang itiak (rendang bebek): duck rendang, speciality of Bukittinggi and Payakumbuh.
- Rendang jamur: mushroom rendang.
- Rendang jantung pisang: banana blossom rendang, speciality of Minangkabau.
- Rendang jariang (rendang jengkol): jengkol rendang, commonly popular in West Sumatran towns, especially Bukittinggi, Payakumbuh, Pasaman and Lubuk Basung.
- Rendang kambing: goat meat redang.
- Rendang jo kantang: beef rendang with baby potatoes, speciality of Kapau.
- Rendang kepiting (rendang ketam): crab rendang, which is crab cooked in rendang spices with sweet soy sauce.
- Rendang lele: Catfish rendang.
- Rendang lidah: beef tongue cooked as rendang.
- Rendang limpa: offal rendang made of cattle spleen.
- Rendang lokan (rendang tiram): marsh clam rendang, speciality of coastal Minangkabau regions such as Pariaman, Painan and Pesisir Selatan.
- Rendang maco: rendang that uses a type of salted fish, specialty of Limapuluh Koto.
- Rendang medan: rendang variant from Medan in North Sumatra, slightly different to Minangkabau rendang. It is more fatty and wet akin to kalio and usually less hot and spicy.
- Rendang padang: Padang rendang commonly sold in Padang restaurants nationwide, dry rendang that uses lean fatless meat.
- Rendang pakis (rendang pucuk paku): vegetable rendang made from pakis or fern leaf, specialty of Pasaman.
- Rendang paru: cow's lung rendang, speciality of Payakumbuh.
- Rendang patin: Pangasius catfish rendang.
- Rendang petai: stir fried petai and common green beans in rendang spices.
- Rendang pucuak ubi (rendang daun singkong): cassava leaf rendang, speciality of Minangkabau.
- Rendang punai (rendang burung dara): rendang made of burung punai or green pigeon.
- Rendang puyuh: rendang made of burung puyuh or quail.
- Rendang rawit: an extra hot and spicy dried rendang spices mixed with dried cabai rawit (bird's eye chili). Not exactly a dish, but more a condiment akin to serundeng, bawang goreng or chili powder that sprinkled upon steamed rice or noodle.
- Rendang rebung: rendang made of bamboo shoot.
- Rendang runtiah (rendang suir): (lit: "shredded rendang") shredded beef or poultry rendang, speciality of Payakumbuh.
- Rendang sapuluik itam (rendang pulut hitam): dough made of ground black sticky rice cooked and served in rendang spice, specialty of Simalanggang.
- Rendang selais: rendang made of selais (Kryptopterus) fish, a genus of catfish found in rivers of Sumatra, popular in Pekanbaru, Riau.
- Rendang tahu: tofu rendang, a vegetarian variant that uses tofu beancurd instead of meat.
- Rendang talua (rendang telur): egg rendang, speciality of Payakumbuh.
- Rendang tempe: tempe rendang, a vegetarian variant that uses tempeh soybean cake instead of meat.
- Rendang teri: anchovy rendang.
- Rendang tongkol: mackerel tuna rendang, speciality of coastal Minangkabau regions.
- Rendang tuna: tuna rendang.
- Rendang tunjang (rendang kikil): rendang made of cartilage and tendons of cow's trotters.
- Rendang ubi: made of ubi kayu or singkong (cassava).
- Rendang udang: shrimp rendang.
- Rendang usus: intestine rendang, made of offals; the intestines of either poultry or cattle. The cattle intestine rendang is quite similar to gulai tambusu, gulai iso or gulai usus.

==== Rendang outside West Sumatra ====
Today, rendang is quite widespread in Indonesia, mainly because of the proliferation of Padang restaurants, which caused rendang to become popular in Indonesian households of various ethnic backgrounds. This has led to the development of variants to accommodate regional preferences. For example, in Java, the rendang—aside from the Padang variety sold in Padang restaurants—tends to be wetter, slightly sweeter, and less spicy to accommodate Javanese tastes.

Rendang variations outside by the Minangkabau:

- Rendang kelinci: rabbit meat rendang, popular in Aceh.
- Rendang babi: pork rendang, the adaptation of rendang by non-Muslim population of Indonesia. Usually consumed in Christian-majority Batak region of North Sumatra and Hindu-majority island of Bali. In Bali, the popularity of rendang has led to this adaptation, since some Balinese Hindus do not consume beef.
- Rendang jawa: Javanese adoption of Minang rendang, which is more soft and moist suited to Javanese taste, usually rather sweet and less spicy compared to Sumatran rendang.

Outside of Indonesia, rendang is also known in Malaysia, Singapore, Brunei, southern Thailand, and the southern Philippines as well as in the Netherlands, Australia, Taiwan, Belgium, and New Zealand.

=== In Malaysia ===
Rendang has a long history in Malaysia with distinct versions unique to individual Malaysian states. The different versions of rendang use different ingredients for the spice mix, resulting in differing flavors to the meat.

- Rendang ayam: chicken rendang.
- Rendang ayam goreng: fried chicken rendang. The popularity of this rendang skyrocketed mainly due to the "rendangate" controversy in 2018.
- Rendang daging or Rendang Rembau: dark, woody coloured meat rendang. Traditionally made using water buffalo meat. These days, beef is commonly used instead.
- Rendang daging hitam: Kicap manis-based black-coloured beef rendang, a specialty of Sarawak.
- Rendang dendeng: thinly sliced dried meat rendang.
- Rendang ikan: fish rendang.
- Rendang ikan pari: stingray rendang, a specialty of Perak.
- Rendang itik: duck rendang, a specialty of Negeri Sembilan and Sarawak. In Sarawak, the duck is roasted first so that the meat is soft and not sticky. In Negeri Sembilan, the duck is preferred to be smoked first.
- Rendang puyuh: quail rendang.
- Rendang kupang: mussels rendang.
- Rendang rusa: venison rendang.
- Rendang udang: prawn rendang, a specialty of Perak.
- Rendang kambing: goat rendang.
- Rendang kerang: cockle rendang. Commonly served as a side dish for nasi lemak.
- Rendang ketam: crab rendang.
- Rendang kijing: kijing, a type of shellfish, cooked with rendang spices.
- Rendang hati: beef liver rendang, a specialty of Johor.
- Rendang telur: boiled egg rendang.
- Rendang kunyit or rendang Kuala Pilah or rendang kuning: yellow-hued rendang, uses fresh turmeric, lemongrass, and coconut milk but with no onion added at all.
- Rendang landak: porcupine rendang, an exotic meat rendang, a specialty of Sekinchan, Selangor.
- Rendang babi: pork rendang. Non-halal rendang that is eaten only by the Chinese and Peranakan community in Malaysia.
- Rendang lengkuas or nasu likku: galangal-based rendang, a specialty of Bugis people in Sabah. Two versions exist in Sabah, wet and dry; both are considered rendang in Malaysia.
- Rendang lokan: lokan rendang, a specialty of Sungai Petani, Kedah.
- Rendang berempah: spice rendang. Emphasizes the abundance of spices in the rendang.
- Rendang paru: beef lung rendang.
- Rendang daun maman: vegetable rendang made from braised Cleome gynandra (maman) leaves, specialty of Gemencheh, Negeri Sembilan,
- Rendang daun pegaga: vegetable rendang made from pegaga leaf.
- Rendang daun puding: vegetable rendang made from the edible leaves of the garden croton, a speciality of Negeri Sembilan.
- Rendang daun ubi kayu: vegetable rendang made from cassava leaf.
- Rendang jantung pisang: banana blossom rendang.
- Rendang serundeng: dry meat floss, derived from rendang. It has a long shelf-life and needs no refrigeration, a specialty of Kelantan.
- Rendang Minang: originated from the Minangkabau people who settled in Negeri Sembilan during the 16th century, but has since evolved from the Sumatran rendang version of the recipe.
- Rendang cili api or Rendang Negeri Sembilan or Rendang hijau: greenish-hued rendang, uses cili api instead of red chili that is normally used in other rendang versions, a specialty of Negeri Sembilan.
- Rendang Tok: dry beef rendang created by the royal cooks of Perak, incorporates spices that were typically inaccessible to the general population.
- Rendang Pahang or opor daging: dark red meat stew cooked with rich spice mix.
- Rendang Perak: simpler version of Rendang Tok, a specialty of Perak.
- Rendang Rawa: Rawa version of rendang, less complicated in terms of ingredients.
- Rendang Kedah: reddish-hued rendang, incorporates the use of red sugar, turmeric leaves, kaffir lime leaves due to the Thai influence on the state cuisine, a specialty of Kedah.
- Rendang Kelantan/Terengganu or kerutuk daging: slow-cooked meat mixed with a unique spice known as kerutub, coconut milk, kerisik and some palm sugar.
- Rendang Nyonya: Peranakan version of rendang, a specialty of Peranakan.
- Rendang Sabah: uses white cumin to replace cinnamon and cloves, a specialty of Sabah.
- Rendang Sarawak: incorporates the use of turmeric leaves, a specialty of Sarawak.
- Rendang Siam: Malay-Siamese version of rendang, incorporates the use of Thai inspired ingredients.

=== Others ===
==== In the Netherlands ====
The Dutch are familiar with rendang through colonial ties and often serve the wet kalio version in the Netherlands—usually as part of a rijsttafel. Indonesian dishes, including rendang, are served in numbers of Indonesian restaurants in Dutch cities, especially The Hague, Utrecht, Rotterdam and Amsterdam.

==== In the Philippines ====
In the Philippines, rendang is most commonly associated with the cuisine of the Muslim Maranao people of Mindanao. It differs from the Indonesian versions in the use of the native spice mix palapa as well as the addition of muscovado sugar.

=== Fusion rendang ===
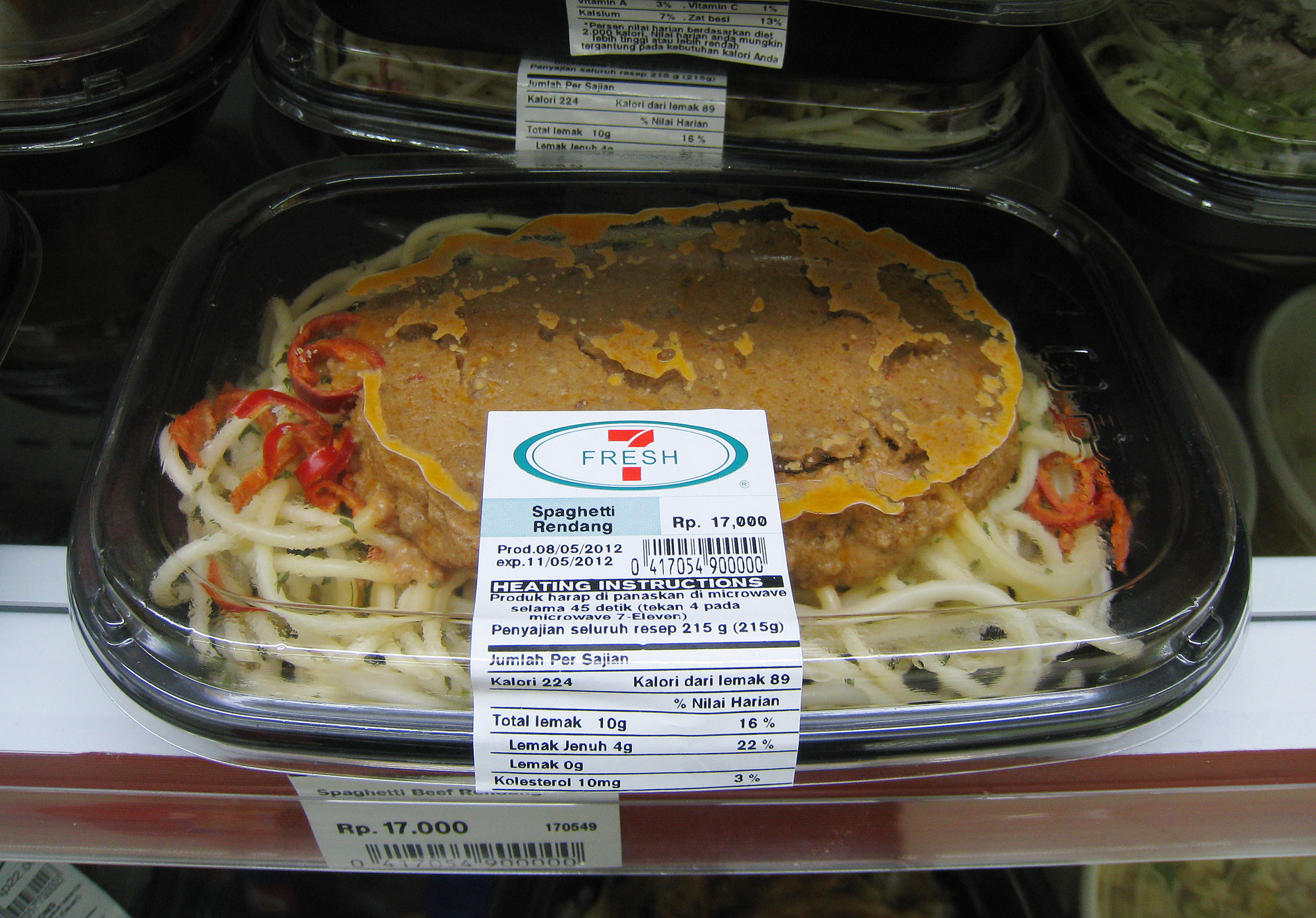
Spaghetti rendang sold in a 7-Eleven convenience store in Jakarta

Rendang bumbu is sometimes used as the base of other fusion dishes. Some chefs in Indonesian sushi establishments, for example, have developed a Japanese-Indonesian fusion cuisine with recipes for krakatau roll, gado-gado roll, rendang roll and gulai ramen. Several chefs and food industries have experimented with fusing rendang with sandwiches, burgers and spaghetti. Burger King at one time served a rendang-flavoured burger in their Singapore and Indonesia chains for a limited promotion period. Spaghetti with rendang could also be found in 7-Eleven convenience stores across Indonesia.

Rendang is also a popular flavour in Indonesian instant noodle variants, such as Indomie Goreng Rendang.

Most recently, there were Taiwanese baozis with rendang fillings sold at Neo Soho Mall in West Jakarta.

== See also ==
- Rendang at the Wikibooks Cookbook subproject
- Cuisine of Indonesia
- Minangkabau cuisine
- Kalio, Indonesian dish
- Similar dishes:
  - Kala bhuna
  - Saksang
  - Dinuguan
  - Svartsoppa
  - Sarapatel
