= Mystacoleucus atridorsalis =

Conservation status
- Least Concern (IUCN 3.1)

Scientific classification
- Kingdom: Animalia
- Phylum: Chordata
- Class: Actinopterygii
- Order: Cypriniformes
- Family: Cyprinidae
- Genus: Mystacoleucus
- Species: M. atridorsalis

Binomial name
- Mystacoleucus atridorsalis Fowler, 1937

Species of fish

Mystacoleucus atridorsalis is a species of cyprinid in the genus Mystacoleucus. It inhabits the Mekong river and has a maximum length of 8.0 centimetres (3.1 in).
