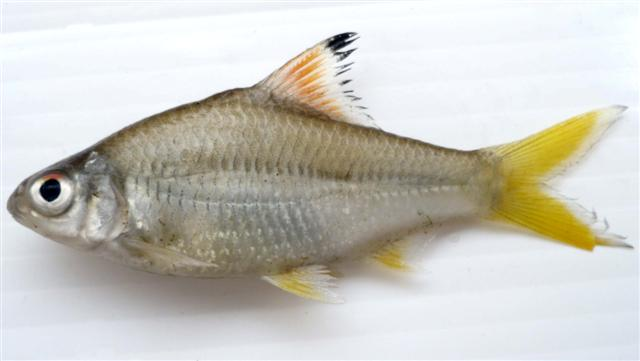

Conservation status
- Least Concern (IUCN 3.1)

Scientific classification
- Kingdom: Animalia
- Phylum: Chordata
- Class: Actinopterygii
- Order: Cypriniformes
- Family: Cyprinidae
- Genus: Mystacoleucus
- Species: M. argenteus

Binomial name
- Mystacoleucus argenteus (Day, 1888)

Synonyms
- Acanthonotus argenteus Day, 1888; Matsya argentea (Day, 1888)

= Mystacoleucus argenteus =

Species of fish

Mystacoleucus argenteus is a species of freshwater ray-finned fish belonging to the family Cyprinidae, the family which includes the carps, barbs, minnows and related fishes. This fish is found in Thailand and Myanmar in the drainage system of the Salween River.
