= Kerisik =

Traditional Malay condiment

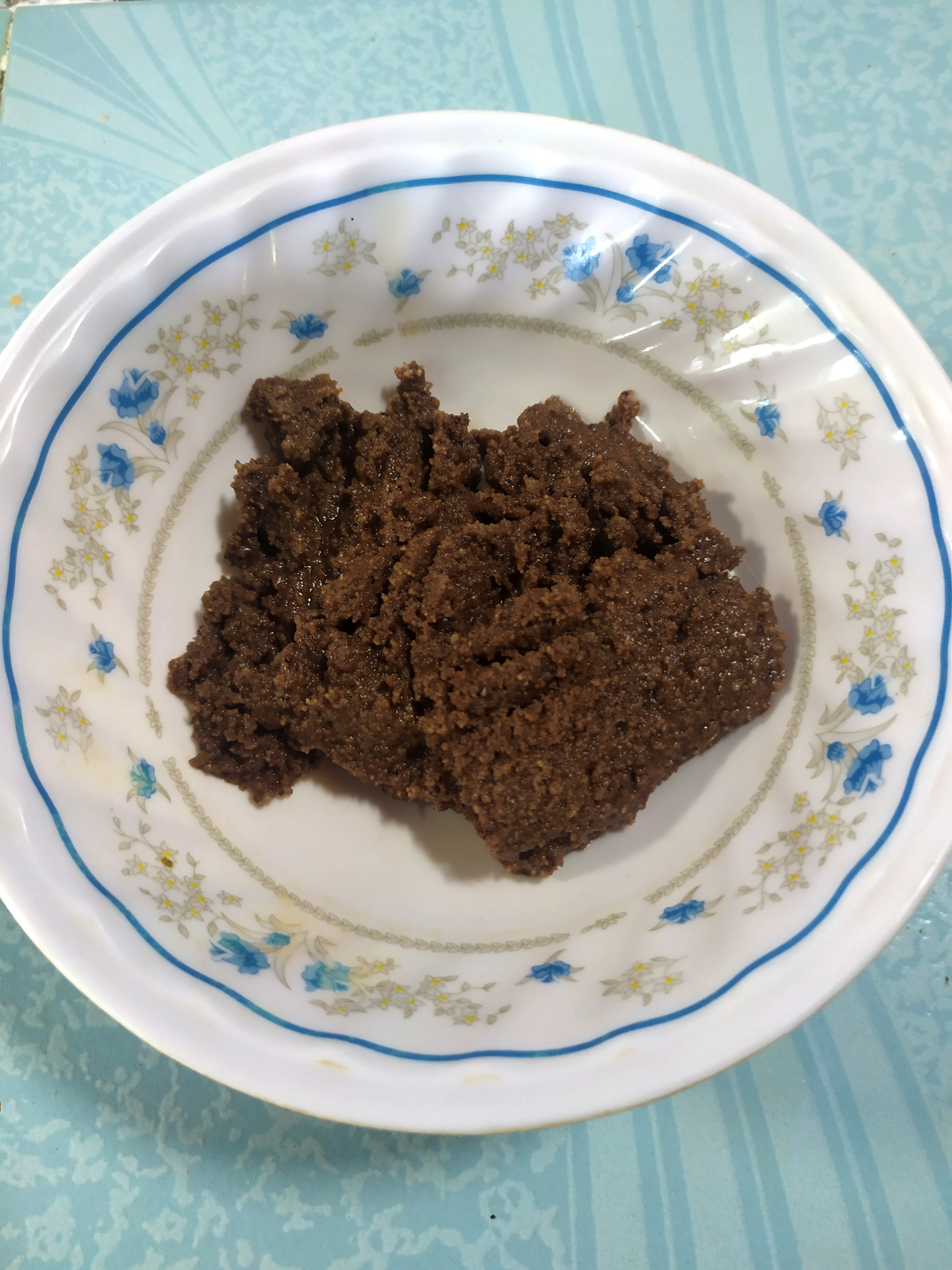
- A bowl of homemade kerisik
- Alternative names: Minangkabau: ambu-ambu, Indonesian: kelapa gongseng
- Type: Ingredient
- Region or state: Sumatra, Singapore, and Malay Peninsula

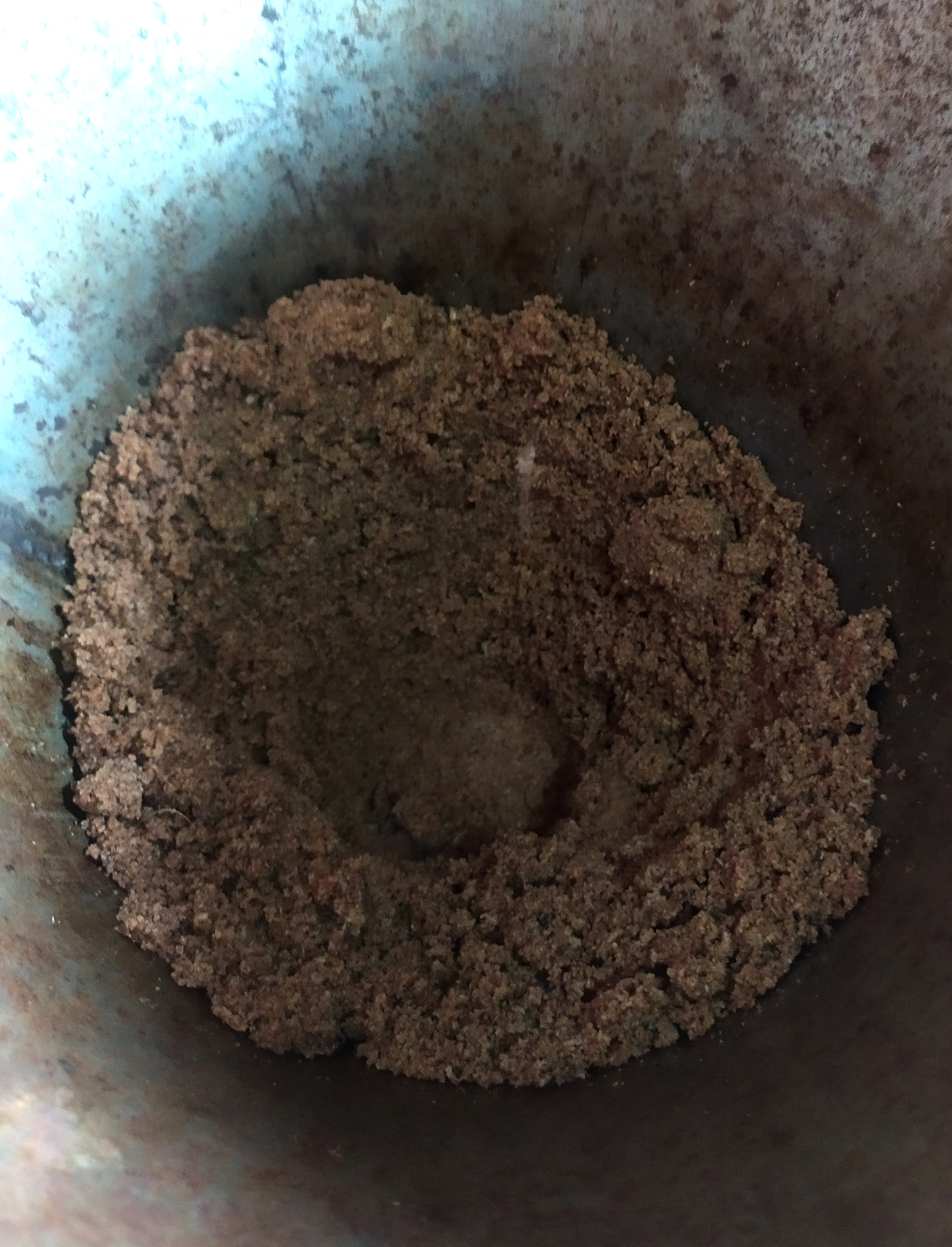
Toasted coconut flesh is pounded to an oily paste to make kerisik.

Kerisik (Jawi: كريسيق), also known as ambu-ambu in Minangkabau and kelapa gongseng in Indonesian, is a condiment made from toasting and grinding grated coconut, used in cooking among the Malay and Minangkabau communities of Malaysia, Indonesia (especially West Sumatra), and Singapore It is sometimes referred to as coconut butter. It can be made at home as a byproduct of extracting coconut milk or bought ready made. Kerisik is used in dishes such as kerabu salads, nasi ulam, gulai and especially rendang as a gravy thickener and to improve seasoning.

Fresh kerisik can be easily made from fresh coconut which is grated and sautéed on low heat, then ground in a mortar and pestle. Dried grated coconut can also be used, however, the resulting paste is not as fragrant. Pre-made kerisik can develop an unpleasant smell.

It is not easily found outside Indonesia, Malaysia and Singapore, and will most likely only be found in Asian specialty food shops outside of these countries.

== Etymology ==
Kerisik means "dry leaves" in both Malaysian and Indonesian. In Malaysian but not Indonesian, it has a broader meaning of "dry and flaky", including dry grated coconut.

== Grading ==
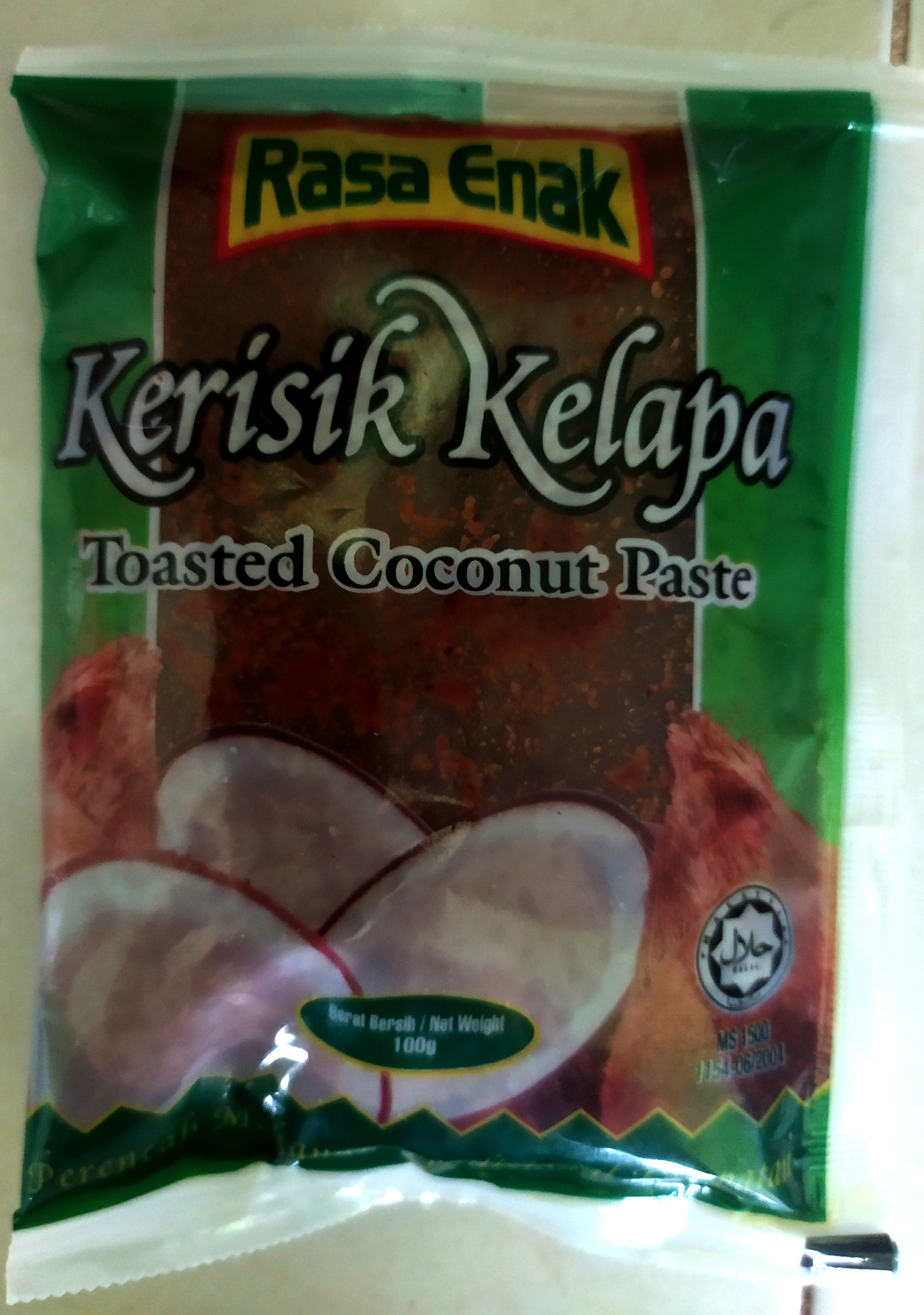
Prepackaged kerisik

Kerisik is divided into grade 'A', for kerisik that is fragrant and creamy, tastes sweet and has a nutty aftertaste, and grade 'B', which tends to have fewer of the fragrant notes which are the key point in choosing a good kerisik. As for the last grade, grade 'C', manufacturers tend to use coconut leftovers from the production of coconut milk. This leaves the kerisik with only the nutty taste and with a bland and husky aftertaste. This 'C' grade kerisik floods the market, confusing customers.

== See also ==
- Malay cuisine
- Serundeng
