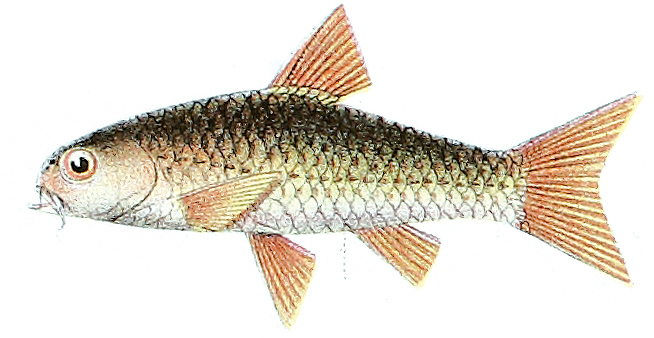
- Mystacoleucus obtusirostris

Scientific classification
- Kingdom: Animalia
- Phylum: Chordata
- Class: Actinopterygii
- Order: Cypriniformes
- Family: Cyprinidae
- Subfamily: Cyprininae
- Genus: Mystacoleucus; Günther, 1868

Type species
- Capoeta padangensis Bleeker, 1852

Synonyms
- Acanthonotus Tickell in Day 1888; Matsya Day, 1889

= Mystacoleucus =

Genus of fishes

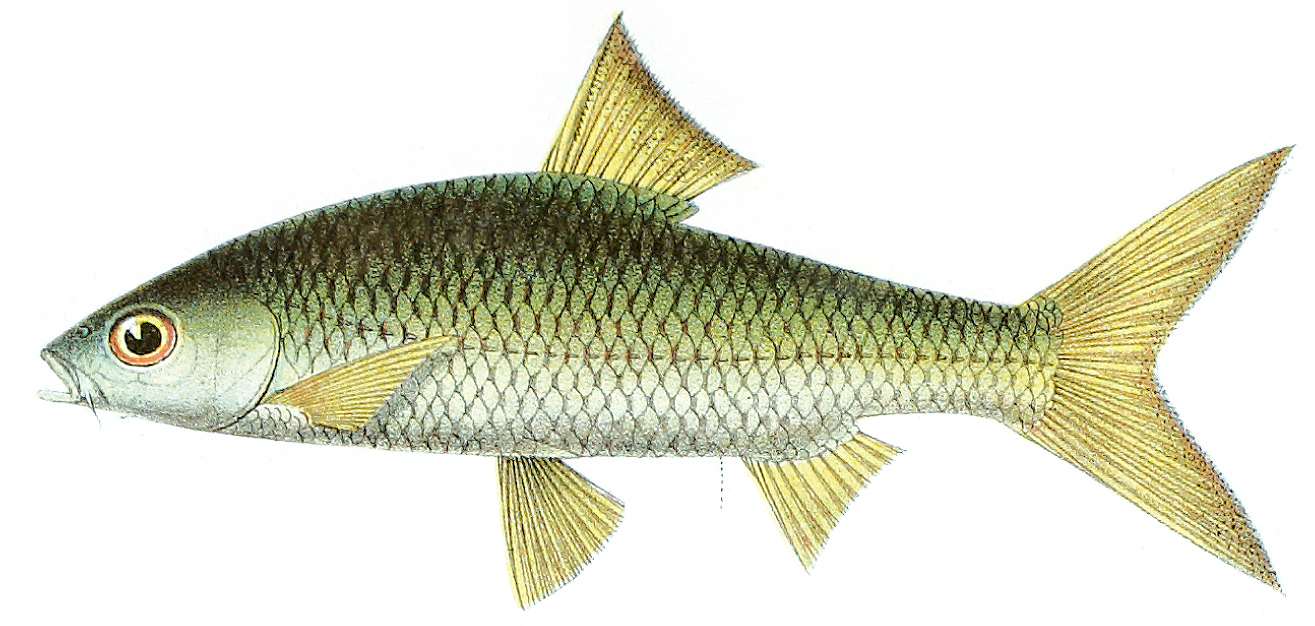
Mystacoleucus padangensis

Mystacoleucus is a genus of freshwater ray-finned fish belonging to the family Cyprinidae, the family which includes the carps, barbs, minnows and related fishes. The fishes in this genus are found in Southeast Asia.

== Species ==
Mystacoleucus contains the following species:

- Mystacoleucus argenteus (F. Day, 1888)
- Mystacoleucus atridorsalis Fowler, 1937
- Mystacoleucus chilopterus Fowler, 1935
- Mystacoleucus ectypus Kottelat 2000
- Mystacoleucus greenwayi Pellegrin & P. W. Fang, 1940
- Mystacoleucus lepturus S. Y. Huang, 1979
- Mystacoleucus obtusirostris (Valenciennes, 1842)
- Mystacoleucus padangensis (Bleeker, 1852)
