= Mystacoleucus greenwayi =

Conservation status
- Least Concern (IUCN 3.1)

Scientific classification
- Kingdom: Animalia
- Phylum: Chordata
- Class: Actinopterygii
- Order: Cypriniformes
- Family: Cyprinidae
- Genus: Mystacoleucus
- Species: M. greenwayi

Binomial name
- Mystacoleucus greenwayi Pellegrin & P. W. Fang, 1940

Species of fish

Mystacoleucus greenwayi is a species of cyprinid fish.

== Common Name ==
Greenway barb

== Habitat ==
Freshwater

== Dispersion ==
Mekong River and Chao Phraya River
