= Mystacoleucus obtusirostris =

Conservation status
- Least Concern (IUCN 3.1)

Scientific classification
- Kingdom: Animalia
- Phylum: Chordata
- Class: Actinopterygii
- Order: Cypriniformes
- Family: Cyprinidae
- Genus: Mystacoleucus
- Species: M. obtusirostris

Binomial name
- Mystacoleucus obtusirostris (Valenciennes, 1842)

Synonyms
- Barbus marginatus Valenciennes, 1842; Systomus marginatus (Valenciennes, 1842); Barbus obtusirostris Kuhl & van Hasselt, 1823; Barbus obtusirostris Valenciennes, 1842; Mystacoleucus marginatus Valenciennes, 1842; Puntius siamensis Sauvage, 1883

Species of fish

Mystacoleucus obtusirostris is a species of ray-finned fish, found in freshwater habitats in Southeast Asia, notably in Thailand in the Mekong River, Chao Phraya River, and Mae Klong River. It is exploited in subsistence fishing.
