= Mystacoleucus ectypus =

Conservation status
- Least Concern (IUCN 3.1)

Scientific classification
- Kingdom: Animalia
- Phylum: Chordata
- Class: Actinopterygii
- Order: Cypriniformes
- Family: Cyprinidae
- Genus: Mystacoleucus
- Species: M. ectypus

Binomial name
- Mystacoleucus ectypus Kottelat, 2000

Species of fish

Mystacoleucus ectypus is a species of cyprinid fish.

== Habitat ==
M. ectypus inhabits freshwater, including riverine habitats.

== Dispersion ==
M. ectypus is known to inhabit the Mekong River Basin.
