= Mystacoleucus lepturus =

Conservation status
- Vulnerable (IUCN 3.1)

Scientific classification
- Kingdom: Animalia
- Phylum: Chordata
- Class: Actinopterygii
- Order: Cypriniformes
- Family: Cyprinidae
- Genus: Mystacoleucus
- Species: M. lepturus

Binomial name
- Mystacoleucus lepturus S. Y. Huang, 1979

Species of fish

Mystacoleucus lepturus is a species of freshwater ray-finned fish belonging to the family Cyprinidae, the family which includes the carps, barbs, minnows and related fishes. It inhabits the Mekong and has a maximum length of 9.2 centimetres (3.6 in).
