= Kalio =

Spicy Indonesian meat dish

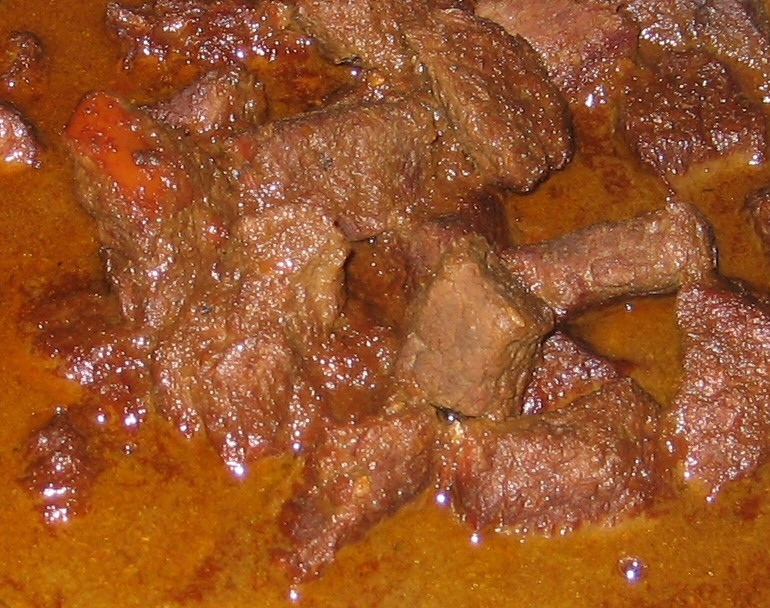
- Kalio
- Alternative names: Wet rendang
- Course: Main course
- Place of origin: Indonesia
- Region or state: West Sumatra
- Serving temperature: Hot or room temperature

Kalio (Jawi: كالياو) is an Indonesian type of rendang that is cooked for a shorter period of time and much of the coconut milk liquid has not evaporated. Kalio has quite abundant liquid sauce acquired from cooked coconut milk that partly has turned into spicy oil, which is quite flavourful if consumed with steamed rice. Much of rendang served abroad are actually more akin to kalio or wet version of rendang. If stored at room temperature, kalio lasts less than a week. Kalio usually has a light golden brown colour, paler than dry rendang.

== See also ==
- Indonesian cuisine
- Minangkabau cuisine
