= Mystacoleucus chilopterus =

Conservation status
- Least Concern (IUCN 3.1)

Scientific classification
- Kingdom: Animalia
- Phylum: Chordata
- Class: Actinopterygii
- Order: Cypriniformes
- Family: Cyprinidae
- Genus: Mystacoleucus
- Species: M. chilopterus

Binomial name
- Mystacoleucus chilopterus Fowler, 1935

Species of fish

Mystacoleucus chilopterus is a species of cyprinid in the genus Mystacoleucus. It lives in Southeast Asia and has a maximum length of 9.1 centimetres (3.6 in). It is not considered threatened or endangered.
