= Kerutuk daging =

Traditional food in Kelantan, Malaysia

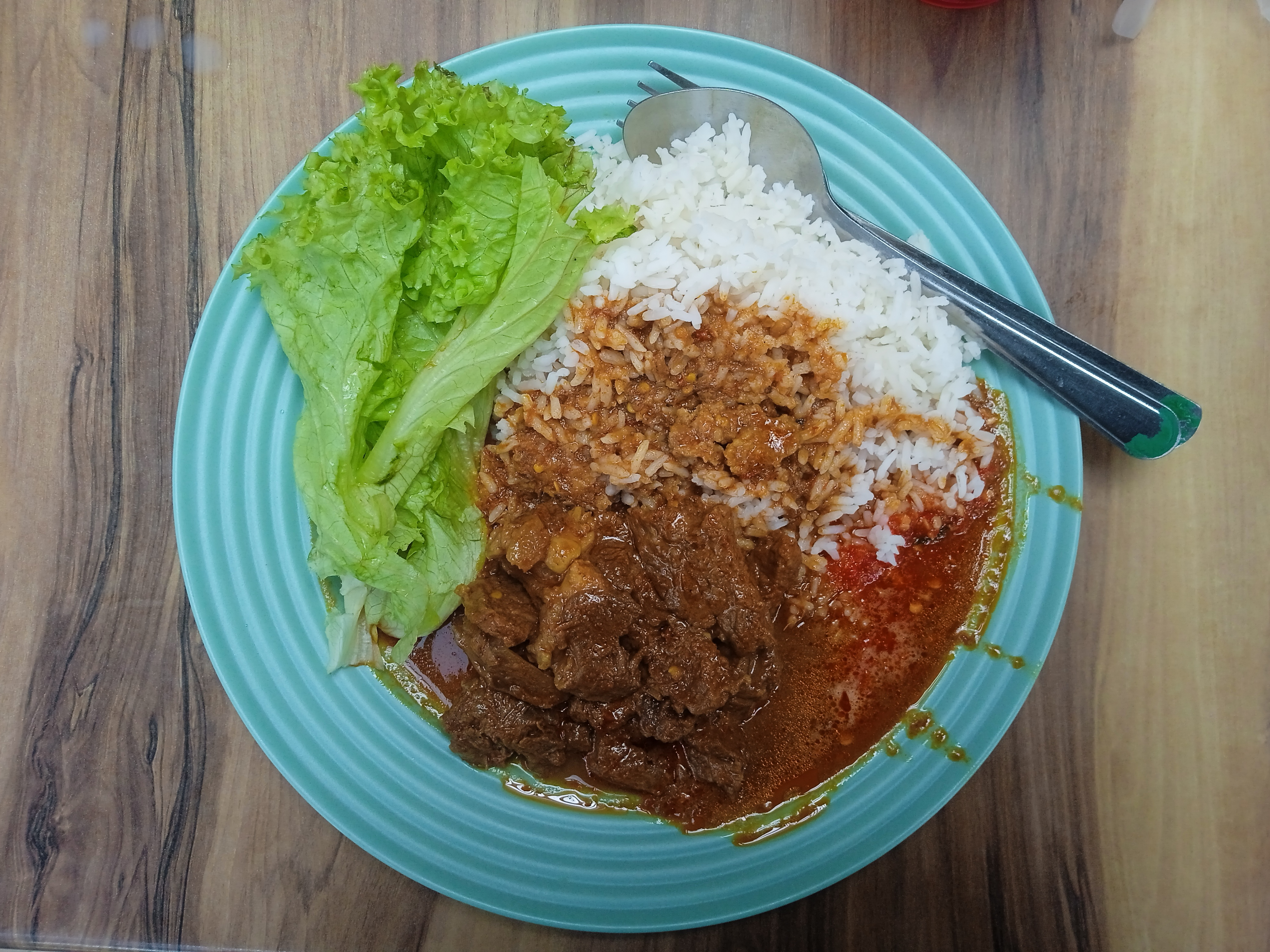
- Course: Main course
- Place of origin: Malaysia
- Region or state: Kelantan
- Main ingredients: Beef, ginger, coconut milk, garlic, shallots, cooking oil, tamarind, salt, palm sugar, galangal, clove, aniseed, cinnamon, garlic, illicium verum, lemongrass, chilli

Kerutuk daging or daging masak kerutuk is a traditional food in Kelantan, Malaysia.

The main ingredient used to prepare this dish is beef (Malay: daging). Kerutuk daging is a very rich type of coconut milk-based curry. Traditionally, it is best eaten with white rice, sambal belacan and ulam-ulaman or Malay salad.

== See also ==
- Cuisine of Malaysia
