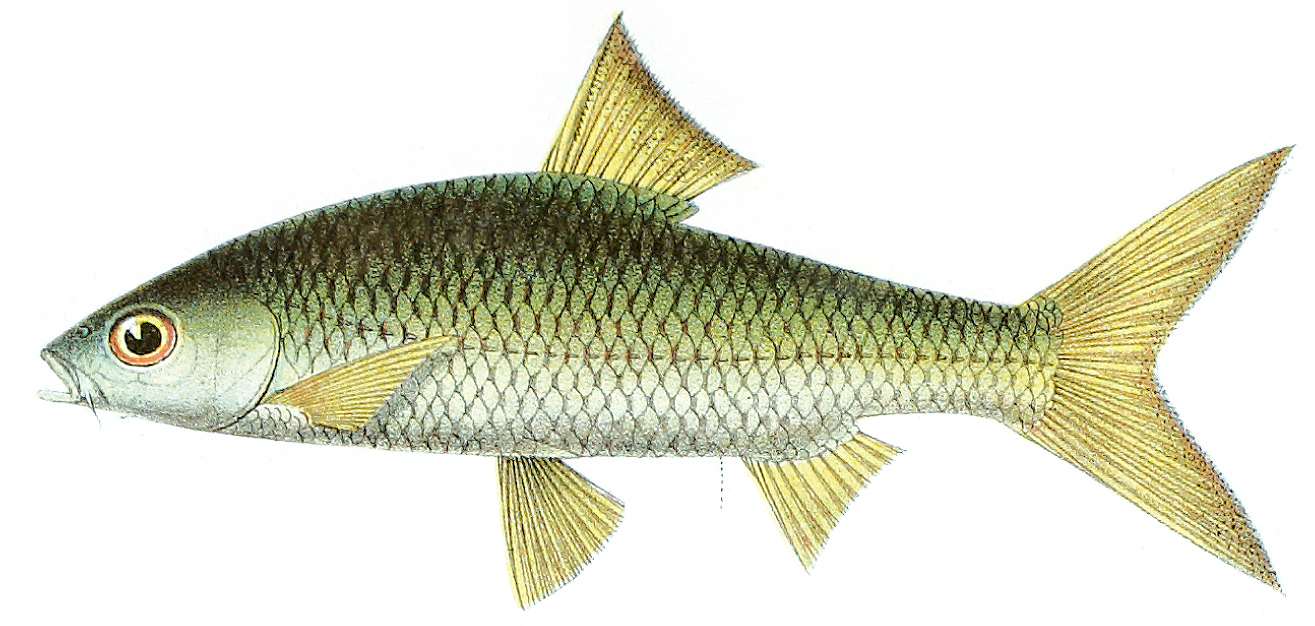

Conservation status
- Vulnerable (IUCN 3.1)

Scientific classification
- Kingdom: Animalia
- Phylum: Chordata
- Class: Actinopterygii
- Order: Cypriniformes
- Family: Cyprinidae
- Genus: Mystacoleucus
- Species: M. padangensis

Binomial name
- Mystacoleucus padangensis (Bleeker, 1852)

Synonyms
- Capoeta padangensis Bleeker, 1852; Puntius padangensis (Bleeker, 1852); Systomus padangensis (Bleeker, 1852)

= Mystacoleucus padangensis =

Species of fish

Mystacoleucus padangensis is a species of freshwater ray-finned fish belonging to the family Cyprinidae, the family which includes the carps, barbs, minnows and related fishes. It inhabits Sumatra, Indonesia, and has a maximum length of 11.6 centimetres (4.6 in).
