= List of Malaysian dishes =

Cuisine of Malaysia

This is a list of dishes found in Malaysian cuisine.

== Staple foods ==
Name	Image	Origin/Popularity	Type	Description
Ambuyat		Sarawak, Sabah and Labuan (Popular in Brunei)	Traditional food	Replacement of rice. A staple food of the indigenous people of Sabah and Sarawak including Lundayeh/Lun Bawang.
Bee Hoon		Nationwide	Rice noodles	A thin form of rice noodles (rice vermicelli).
Pulut		Nationwide	Rice dumpling or rice cake	It is made from sticky rice.
Ketupat		Nationwide	Rice dumpling or rice cake	It is made from rice packed inside a diamond-shaped container of woven palm leaf pouch.
Kway teow		Nationwide	Rice noodles	A type of noodle made from rice with sprawl-shaped.
Lemang		Malay, Minangkabau and Orang Asli	Rice dish	A traditional Malay food made of glutinous rice, coconut milk and salt, cooked in a hollowed bamboo stick lined with banana leaves in order to prevent the rice from sticking to the bamboo.
Mi		Nationwide	Noodles	Food made from unleavened dough which is rolled flat and cut, stretched or extruded, into long strips or strings.
Nasi putih		Nationwide	Steamed rice	Steamed rice as a staple food.

== Main dishes ==
Name	Image	Region	Type	Description
Ayam bakar		Nationwide	Grilled chicken	Charcoal-grilled spiced chicken.
Ayam goreng		Nationwide	Fried chicken	Spiced chicken fried in coconut oil.
Ayam kecap		Southern Peninsular	Chicken	Chicken simmered or braised in sweet soy sauce.
Ayam percik		East Coast Peninsular	Grilled chicken	Grilled chicken with a spicy, curry-like sauce.
Ayam tandori		Nationwide	Roasted chicken	Roasted chicken marinated in yoghurt and spices in a tandoor.
Asam pedas fish		Malacca	Dish	
Bean Sprouts Chicken		Ipoh, Perak	Dish	Served with light soya sauce flavoured with oil.
Chai tow kway		Nationwide	Common dish (Dim sum)	A variety of dim sum.
Chilli crab		Peninsular Malaysia	Seafood dish	Derived from Chinese cuisine.
Curry		Nationwide	Dish	Derived from Indian cuisine.
Fish ball		Nationwide	Common food	Small balls that were made from fish.
Gulai		Nationwide	Curry	Meat cooked in a thick, rich and spicy curry sauce.
Ikan Bakar		Nationwide (Popular in Peninsular Malaysia)	Seafood dishes	Usually eaten with sambal or shrimp paste.
Ikan goreng		Nationwide	Fried fish	Spiced fish/seafood deep-fried in coconut oil
Kari ayam		Nationwide	Curry dish	A type of curry dish cooked using chicken and spices.
Kari kambing		Peninsular Malaysia	Curry dish	A type of curry dish cooked using lamb or mutton.
Kari kepala ikan		West Coast Peninsular	Curry dish	A type of curry dish cooked using head of a red snapper, influenced by Indian and Peranakan cuisine.
Begedil		Southern Peninsular	Fried dish	Derived from Javanese cuisine of Indonesia. Made of ground potatoes, minced meat, peeled and ground corn or tofu, or minced fish. Most common perkedel are made from mashed potatoes.
Rendang		Nationwide	Meat dish	Chunks of beef stewed in coconut milk and spicy thick curry gravy.
Telur pindang		Southern Peninsular	Egg dish	Hardboiled eggs boiled in water mixed with salt, shallot skins, teak leaf and other spices.
Tempoyak ikan patin		Northern and East Coast of Peninsular	Fish curry	Catfish served in sweet and spicy fermented durian curry.
Otak-otak		Nationwide; Popular in Muar, Johor	Cake type made from fish meat and spices	Traditionally served steamed, wrapped inside a banana leaf or grilled in coconut leaves.
Oyster omelette		Asia	Seafood dish	The dish consists of an omelette with a filling primarily composed of small oysters.
Sata		Terengganu	Traditional dish	Consisting of spiced fish meat wrapped in banana leaves and cooked on a grill.
Satay		Nationwide	Dish	Pieces of meat skewered on sticks and usually cooked over charcoal. Can be found throughout all the states of Malaysia in restaurants and on the street.
Satay celup		Malacca, Penang	Dish	Popular in Malacca and Penang.

== Soups ==
Name	Image	Region	Type	Description
Sop ekor		Peninsular	Meat soup	
Sup Kambing		Nationwide	Soup	Can be found all over Malaysia.
Sayur Lodeh		Selangor and Johor	Soup	Vegetable soup prepared in coconut milk
Yong tau foo		Nationwide	Soup	A type of Chinese soup dish.
Ayam pansuh		Sarawak	Soup	A chicken soup cooked in bamboo along with seasonings. A dish popular in Sarawak, Malaysia.
Bak kut teh		Klang, Selangor	Soup	A soup that consists of meaty pork ribs in a complex broth of herbs and spices, boiled together with pork bones for hours.

== Breads ==
Name	Image	Region	Type	Description
Apam		Nationwide	Pancake	A steamed dough made of rice flour, coconut milk, yeast and palm sugar, usually served with grated coconut.
Chapathi		Peninsular	Flatbread	A thin, unleavened flat bread originated from India, brought by the immigrants to the country early in the 19th century. Usually served with beef or mutton curry.
Dosai		Peninsular	Fermented Crepe or Pancake	Derived from Tamil Indian cuisine.
Kaya toast		Nationwide	Toast	Kaya toast is prepared with kaya (coconut jam).
Murtabak		Nationwide	Pancake	Derived from Middle East and also from Indian cuisine.
Naan		Nationwide	Flatbread	A leavened, oven-baked flatbread. It is usually eaten with an array of sauces such as chutney and curries.
Ramly Burger		Nationwide	Hamburger	Can be found all over Malaysia but mainly in Selangor and Kuala Lumpur
Roti canai		Nationwide	Flatbread	Derived from Indian cuisine.
Roti Jala		Nationwide	Pancakes	Served with curry.One of the famous food in Malaysia.
Roti John		Nationwide	Sandwich	A popular Malay sandwich in Malaysia and Singapore.

== Salads ==
Name	Image	Region	Type	Description
Acar		Nationwide	Condiment and Salad	A type of a Pickling that can be found in Indonesia, Malaysia, and Singapore.
Kinilaw		Sabah	Salad	A cooking process that relies on vinegar to denature the ingredients, similar to ceviche. Usually used to prepare raw seafood. It can also be used to prepare lightly cooked meat or vegetables.
Pasembur		Penang	Salad	A type of Indian salad.
Popiah		Nationwide	Spring roll	Can be found on street vendors around Malaysia.
Rojak		Peninsular	Salad	A traditional fruit and vegetable salad dish commonly found in Indonesia, Malaysia and Singapore.
Ulam (salad)		Nationwide	Salad	Can be eaten simply as it is, or with cucumber, cabbage and eggplant.
Urap		Southern Peninsular	Salad dish	A salad dish of steamed vegetables mixed with seasoned and spiced grated coconut for dressing.
Yusheng/Yee Sang		Nationwide	Salad	Consumed during Chinese New Year.

== Noodle dishes ==
Name	Image	Region	Type	Description
Pan mee		Nationwide	Noodle dish	Derived from Hakka cuisine.
Char kway teow		Nationwide	Noodle dish	A popular noodle dish in Malaysia and Singapore that is made from flat rice noodles.
Curry Mee		Malaysia	Noodle dish	Usually made up of thin yellow egg noodles or/and string thin mee-hoon (rice vermicelli) with spicy curry soup, chilli/sambal, coconut milk, and a choice of dried tofu, prawns, cuttlefish, chicken, egg and mint leaves.
Duck soup noodles	—	Penang, Malaysia	Noodle soup	Consists of ingredients such as duck meat in hot soup with mixed herbs and slim white noodles known as mee-sua.
Hokkien mee		Nationwide	Fried noodles	Served in many Southeast Asian countries (mostly Malaysia and Singapore) and was brought there by immigrants from the Fujian in southeastern China.
Laksa		Penang, Perlis, Kedah, (Ipoh and Kuala Kangsar in Perak), Johor, Sarawak and Kelantan	Noodle soup	The famous one is the Penang laksa.
Laksa kelantan		Kelantan	Noodle soup	A very popular dish in Kelantan, Malaysia.
Laksa Sarawak		Sarawak	Noodle soup	A very popular dish in Sarawak, Malaysia.
Lor mee		Nationwide (Popular in Singapore)	Noodle dish	One of Chinese-inspired noodle dish.
Maggi goreng		Malaysia	Instant noodles	A type of instant noodles that are popular in Malaysia.
Mee Bandung Muar		Muar, Johor	Noodle dish	Traditional noodle cuisine from Muar.
Mee goreng		Nationwide	Noodle dish	Derived from Chinese cuisine.
Mee hailam	—	—	—	—
Mee Kolok		Kuching, Sarawak	Noodle dish	A type of noodles popular in Kuching, Sarawak.
Mee pok		Nationwide	Noodle dish	A type of Chinese noodle.
Mee rebus		Malaysia (Popular in Singapore)	Boiled noodle dish	A popular noodle dish in Malaysia and Singapore.
Mee siam		Peninsular Malaysia (Popular in Singapore)	Siamese noodle	A type of dish of thin rice noodles.
Mee sup	—	—	—	—
Mihun sup	—	—	—	—
Soto		Nationwide	Traditional noodle soup dish	One of the popular noodle dish both in Indonesia and Malaysia.
Wonton noodles		Nationwide	Noodle dish	Derived from Cantonese cuisine.

== Rice dishes ==
Name	Image	Region	Type	Description
Banana Leaf Rice		Peninsular Malaysia	Rice dish	Derived from Indian cuisine.
Briyani		Peninsular Malaysia	Rice dish	Derived from Indian cuisine, also there is a famous local version in Batu Pahat, Johor.
Bubur Ashura		Peninsular Malaysia	Porridge	Type of porridge made from grains.
Bubur ayam		Nationwide	Porridge	Rice porridge
Bubur pedas		Sarawak	Porridge	Type of porridge made from finely ground sauteed rice and grated coconut. It is popular during Ramadan.
Claypot chicken rice		Nationwide	Rice dish	Usually served with Chinese sausage.
Hainanese Chicken Rice		Nationwide	Rice dish	Derived by Hainanese immigrants.
Nasi Ambeng		Selangor, Johor	Rice dish	A popular west coast Malaysian Javanese dish, eaten during special occasions.
Economy rice		Nationwide	Rice dish	A rice dish that is eaten with a variety of proteins and vegetables.
Nasi Dagang		Kelantan, Terengganu	Rice dish	A type of dish consisting of rice steamed in coconut milk, fish curry and extra ingredients such as fried shaved coconut, hard-boiled eggs and vegetable pickles.
Nasi daging		Kedah	Rice dish	
Nasi Goreng		Nationwide	Rice dish	A type of dish popular in Indonesia and Malaysia.
Nasi goreng pattaya		Peninsular Malaysia	Rice dish	A Malaysian dish made by covering or wrapping chicken fried rice, in fried egg. It is often served with chili sauce and cucumber. The name comes from Pattaya, Thailand.
Nasi Hujan Panas		East Coast Peninsular	Rice dish	A rainbow rice dish is eaten with a sort of protein and vegetables.
Nasi Itik		Nationwide	Rice dish	Made of either braised or roasted duck and plain white rice.
Nasi Kandar		Penang	Rice dish	A popular northern Malaysian dish, which originates from Penang.
Nasi kebuli		Pahang	Rice dish	Steamed rice dish cooked in goat broth, milk, and ghee. Usually served during Mawlid.
Nasi kerabu		Kelantan, Terengganu	Rice dish	A type of Nasi ulam, in which blue-colored rice is eaten with dried fish or fried chicken, crackers, pickles and other salads.
Nasi Kuning		Nationwide	Rice dish	A popular Malaysian dish usually served during special occasions.
Nasi Lemak		Nationwide	Rice dish	A fragrant rice dish cooked in coconut milk and "pandan" leaf commonly found in Malaysia, where it is considered the national dish of Malaysia.
Nasi minyak		Terengganu	Rice dish	A popular east coast Malaysian dish usually served during weddings.
Nasi paprik		—	Rice dish	—
Nasi Tomato		West Coast Peninsular	Rice dish	A popular west coast Malaysian dish, usually eaten with Ayam Masak Merah.
Nasi Tumpang		Kelantan	Rice dish	A popular east coast Malaysian dish, which originates from Kelantan.
Nasi ulam		Kelantan	Rice dish	A steamed rice dish mixed with various herbs, vegetables, and spices and accompanied by various side dishes

== Snacks ==
Name	Image	Region	Type	Description
Keropok (Crackers)		Nationwide, particularly coastal towns such as Malacca, Pulau Pangkor and Lumut	Snack	A popular snack in Malaysia, particularly served at homes of many during festive celebration. It can be found in many groceries stores and supermarkets, examples of popular household brands in Malaysia are Rota Prawn Crackers and myReal Pulau Pangkor Prawn Crackers. One of the most popular type of prawn cracker in Malaysia are the Keropok Udang Geragau Melaka.
Kerepek (Crackers)		Nationwide, particularly coastal towns such as Selangor and Johor	Snack	A popular snack in Malaysia, particularly served at homes of many during festive celebration. Vegan version of Keropok
Jemput-jemput (Cokodok, Cucur)		Malaysia	Fritter type snack	A traditional Malaysian fritter snack that is made from flour and can be choose either from banana, anchovies, prawns, onion or maize for flavours) or also can be made with only using flour.
Curry puff		Nationwide	Snack	A type of snack or kuih. Usually filled with chicken and potato with a dried curry inside.
Amplang		Sabah	Snack	Fish cracker snack, made from mackerel.
Rempeyek		Selangor and Johor	Snack	A deep-fried savoury Javanese cracker, made from flour with other ingredients, bound or coated by crispy flour batter.
Mee Siput Muar		Muar, Johor	Snack Cracker	A deep-fried circular-shaped-dried-noodles snack, made from flour with other ingredients, eaten with Sambal.
Keropok lekor		Terengganu	Snack	A keropok that is made from fish.
Pisang goreng		Nationwide	Snack	Deep-fried banana dipped in flour.
Akok (food)		Popular in Kelantan state	Snack	Tradisional Kelantanese dessert snack made from egg, flour, brown sugar.
Kuih peria		Terengganu	Snack	Made from glutinous rice flour and red bean paste for filling
Kuih kosui		Nationwide	Snack	Steamed rice cake

== Preserved meat ==
Name	Image	Region	Type	Description
Bakkwa	—	Nationwide	Dried meat	A type of dried preserved pork.
Belutak	—	Brunei and Sarawak	Fermeted meat	A sausage made from meat.
Char siu		Nationwide	Pork meat	A type of roasted pork.
Chinese sausage		Nationwide	Pork meat	A sausage made from pork.
Dendeng		Nationwide	Meat dish	A thinly sliced dried meat that is made of preserved through a mixture of spices and dried via a frying process.
Pekasam	—	Northern Malaysia and Sarawak	Fermeted meat	A freshwater fish that fermented until it tastes sour, then seasoned with chili and sugar.
Serunding		Peninsular Malaysia	Sprinkle dry condiments	Grated coconut sauteed and spiced, eaten with any traditional staple food.
Sinalau bakas	—	Sabah	Smoked wild boar	

== Desserts ==
Name	Image	Region	Type	Description
Ais kacang		Nationwide	Dessert	Also known as air batu campur or ABC in Malaysia.
Agar Agar		Nationwide	Dessert	Puddings flavoured jellies like almond tofu, as well as fruit aspics.
Cendol		Nationwide (Popular in Indonesia)	Dessert	Can be found on street vendors during Ramadan.
Dadih		Nationwide (Popular in Negeri Sembilan and Terengganu)		A buffalo milk based cheese
Dodol	—	Nationwide (Popular in Indonesia)	Confectionery	Served during the Muslim Aidilfitri (Eid al-Fitr).
Bubur kacang hijau (Green bean porridge)		Nationwide	Dessert	A type of porridge made from Mung bean.
Bubur pulut hitam		Nationwide	Dessert	A type of porridge made from black glutinious rice.
Bubur cha cha		Penang, Melaka	Dessert	A type of porridge.
Mango sticky rice		Nationwide	Dessert	Mango eaten with glutinious rice.
Durian sticky rice		Nationwide	Dessert	Durian eaten with glutinious rice.
Roti tissue		Malaysia	Dessert	Available at most local Mamak stalls in Malaysia and Singapore.
Puding Diraja		Pekan, Pahang	Dessert	Pudding is garnished with jala emas, and served with a cold sauce made from milk and cornflour.
Putu mayam		Peninsular Malaysia	Dish	Derived from Tamil Indian cuisine.
Tapai		Nationwide	Dessert	A popular dessert at Malay homes throughout Peninsular Malaysia during Hari Raya, made from fermented glutinous rice or tapioca.

== Spreads ==
Name	Image	Region	Type	Description
Kacang Coklat		Nationwide	Spreads	Usually eat with a toast.
Kaya		Nationwide	Spread	Usually eat with a toast.

== Condiments and sauces ==
Name	Image	Region	Type	Description
Belacan		Nationwide	Condiment	Used in many dishes as an indgredient.
Budu		Kelantan and Terengganu	Condiment	Traditionally made by mixing anchovies and salt and fermenting for 140 to 200 days. It is used as a flavoring and is normally taken with fish, rice, and raw vegetables.
Cincalok		Malacca	Condiment	Fermented small shrimps or krill.
Kerisik		Malay	Sprinkle dry condiments	A condiment made from roasted coconut meat. This condiment usually used in Malay cuisine, such as rendang and kerabu.
Sweet soy sauce and Kicap Masin		Nationwide	Sauce	Sweet Soy sauces and salty soy sauce
Otak Udang		Peninsular Malaysia	Sauce	A black colored shrimp paste. This condiment usually used with laksa, popiah and rojak.
Sambal		Nationwide	Condiment	A type of chili sauce/paste. There are a variety of different types of sambal. It is usually eaten with a meal of rice or other dishes.
Sos Tiram		Nationwide	Sauce	A black colored Oyster sauce.
Tauco		West Coast Peninsular	Condiment	Usually cook with a source of protein.
Tempoyak		Nationwide	Condiment	Usually eaten with a meal of rice.
Tuhau		Sabah	Condiment	A plant from the genus Etlingera. Usually eaten raw after mixed with chili, vinegar, and salt. Also fried.

== Cakes and pastries ==
Name	Image	Region	Type	Description
Batik cake		Nationwide	Dessert	A type of chocolate cake similar to the hedgehog slice made using Marie biscuit.
Kek Lapis Sarawak		Sarawak	Dessert	A spiced layered cake, made mainly of egg yolk, flour and margarine/butter.
Pandan cake		Southern Peninsular	Dessert	A light, fluffy, green-colored sponge cake flavored with the juices of pandan leaves.
Bahulu		West Coast Peninsular	Dessert	A Malay traditional cake with soft texture. Usually served for breakfast.
Malay sponge cake		Peninsular Malaysia	Dessert	A Malay traditional cake with soft texture, very popular in Hong Kong.

== Drinks ==
Name	Image	Region	Type	Description
Bandung		Malaysia (Popular in Johor and during Ramadan)	Beverage	A beverage consists of milk flavoured with rose cordial syrup, giving a pink colour.
Ipoh white coffee		Ipoh, Perak	Beverage	A popular white coffee in Perak.
Janda pulang		Negeri Sembilan, Malaysia	Beverage	A beverage consists of water, Coconut contents and palm sugar.
Coconut water		Nationwide	Coconut water	Coconut water. The water inside a coconut.
Susu Kacang Soya		Nationwide	Beverage	
Teh See	—	Nationwide	Beverage	Derived from Chinese cuisine.
Teh halia		Nationwide	Beverage	A tea mixed with ginger.
Teh krisantimum		Nationwide	Beverage	
Teh tarik		Malaysia (Popular in Singapore)	Beverage	Made from black tea mix with condensed milk or evaporated milk.
Teh C Peng Special		Nationwide (Popular in Sabah and Sarawak in East Malaysia)	Beverage	A unique combination of brown sugar, evaporated milk and red tea which is a local speciality at café's and coffee shops originating from Kuching, Sarawak.
Tenom coffee		Tenom, Sabah	Beverage	A popular Robusta coffee variety in Sabah.
Milo Dinosaur		Nationwide	Beverage	A popular Milo variety in Malaysia.
Tuak		Nationwide (Popular in Sabah and Sarawak in East Malaysia)	Alcoholic beverage	A type of alcoholic drink.

== See also ==
- Malaysian cuisine
