= SugarBun =

Malaysia-based fast food chain

Sugar Bun Corporation Berhad
- Company type: Subsidiary
- Industry: Food service
- Founded: 1979; 47 years ago in Kuching, Sarawak, Malaysia
- Headquarters: Kota Kinabalu, Sabah (Main); Kuching, Sarawak (Regional)
- Number of locations: 90+ (2023)
- Area served: Malaysia, Brunei and Bangladesh
- Key people: Datuk Joseph Ambrose Lee (Managing Director, Borneo Oil Berhad)
- Products: Fast food; Malaysian Borneo cuisine
- Parent: Borneo Oil Bhd
- Website: www.sugarbun.com

Sugar Bun Corporation Berhad, doing business as SugarBun is a Malaysian-owned chain of quick-service restaurants that originated in Kuching, Sarawak, Malaysia. Founded in 1979, it initially operated as an ice cream parlor before transitioning into the fast food industry. While its primary presence is in Sarawak, it also has locations in other Malaysian states, as well as in Brunei and Bangladesh.

The menu at SugarBun features a variety of dishes, including fried broasted chicken, savoury rice and fish burgers, which have become popular among patrons. In addition to its classic offerings, SugarBun incorporates local Sarawakian and Bornean culinary traditions into its menu, catering to a diverse range of tastes and preferences.

== History ==
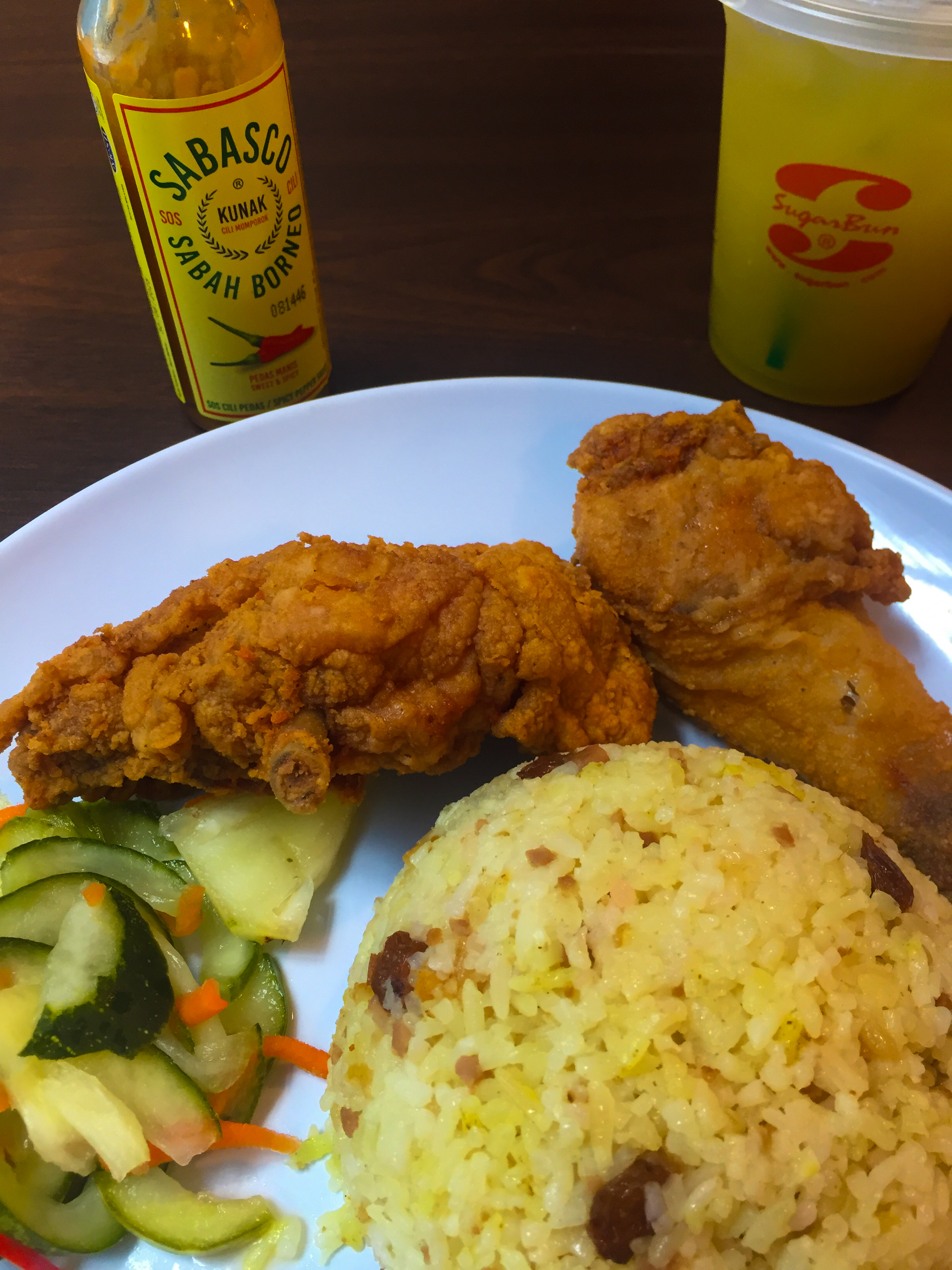
SugarBun's broasted chicken, seasoned with Sarawak pepper, served with savoury rice, pickled vegetables, a bottle of Sabasco Sauce and a glass of Calamansi Juice.

=== Early origin ===
Founded in 1979 near the Kenyalang Theatre in Kuching, Sarawak, SugarBun originated as an ice cream and snack parlor established by Mr. Wung, an entrepreneur. Influenced by a memorable phrase he encountered during a trip to Taiwan, he named it SugarBun, thus initiating the establishment of the brand.

=== Cultural shift ===
In the 1980s, while Sarawak had limited fast food options, SugarBun seized the opportunity presented by the local population's growing fascination with contemporary dining experiences, particularly those centered around chicken-based dishes.

In the absence of fast food restaurants during that time, Sarawakians' exposure to global culinary trends was primarily through advertisements from international chains like KFC and McDonald's broadcast on the radio stations. Despite the absence of fast food establishments, these promotions piqued the residents' curiosity about the concept, laying the groundwork for future developments.

=== Innovation ===
Responding to consumer preferences within two to three years of its inception, SugarBun introduced broasted chicken as a key menu item. This innovative dish, cooked using advanced roasting fryers that combined deep frying and pressure cooking methods, quickly gained popularity with its unique Sarawak pepper-infused flavor.

The incorporation of this cutting-edge fryer technology was notably made possible by an American associate who introduced Mr. Wung to the equipment during a visit to the United States. Following this introduction, Mr. Wung successfully acquired the fryer, signifying a notable advancement in SugarBun's culinary offerings and capabilities.

In 1981, SugarBun reached a notable milestone as it entered the fast food sector by launching a new venue. At the forefront of this initiative was SB Chicken, positioned as the flagship offering. This expansion represented a significant step forward for SugarBun, enhancing its presence in the fast food market while providing a foundation for further growth.

Furthermore, Wung's brother introduced an innovative recipe for SugarBun's savoury rice, a menu offering that has sustained its popularity throughout the years. Another notable addition during the early stages of SugarBun's establishment was the Hoki fish burger, originally from New Zealand. This fish burger quickly became a signature item on SugarBun's menu.

By 1991–1992, there was a noticeable shift in consumer preferences, marked by a surge in demand for chicken dishes. During this period, SugarBun saw a notable increase in business, which mirrored a shifting preference among Sarawakians towards dining establishments that provided freshly prepared meals with minimal oil content.

=== Transition and expansion ===
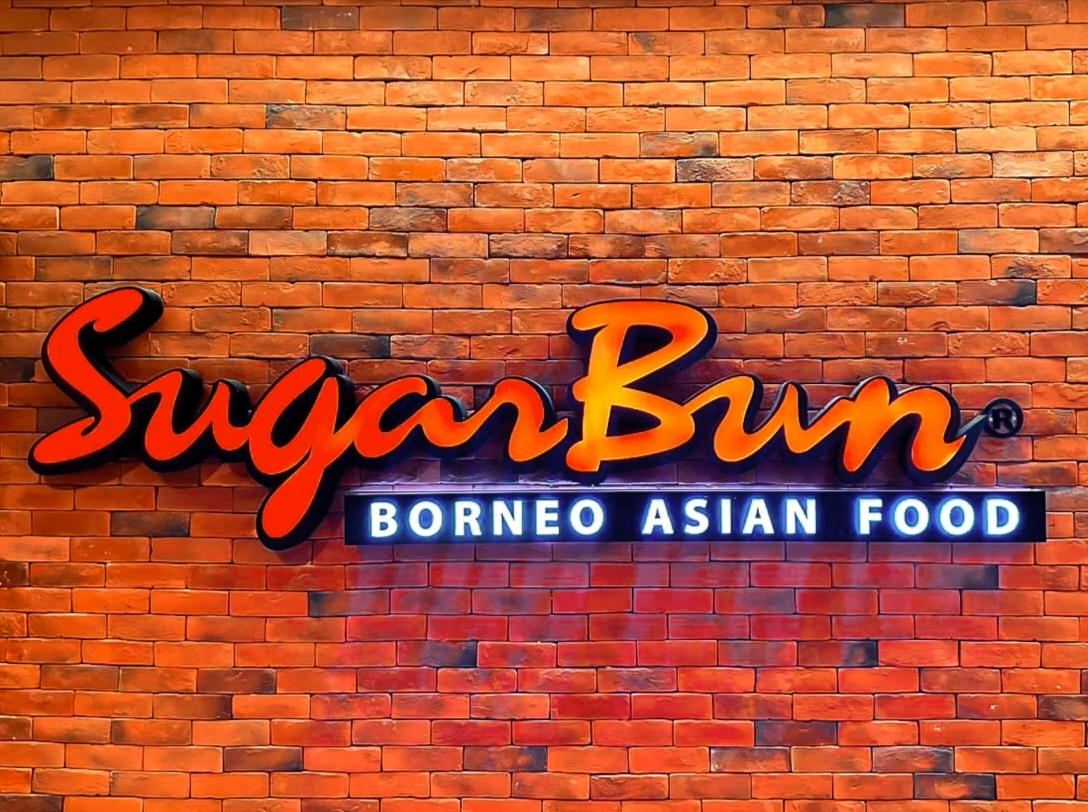
"SugarBun - Borneo Asian Food", the flagship brand under the chain

A pivotal moment in the history of SugarBun took place in 1993 when the ownership underwent a transition to new shareholders. This transition occurred alongside a significant milestone for the brand, as it had already established 12 restaurants by that time. This change in ownership marked a crucial juncture in SugarBun's journey, signalling both growth and evolution as it continued to expand its presence in the market.

In 1997, SugarBun's parent company, Borneo Oil, reached a notable achievement by being listed on the Second Board of the Kuala Lumpur Stock Exchange (KLSE). This event not only reinforced SugarBun's position within the industry but also paved the way for potential opportunities.

The year 2001 marked another crucial phase for SugarBun with the introduction of a revamped menu featuring a diverse range of Asian dishes. This menu transformation encompassed additions such as Chicken Mushroom Soup, Sambal Eco Fish, Assam Eco Fish, Nasi Lemak and Chicken Curry, complementing the existing favourites. The introduction of these new offerings not only led to a notable surge in sales but also fostered greater customer engagement with the brand.

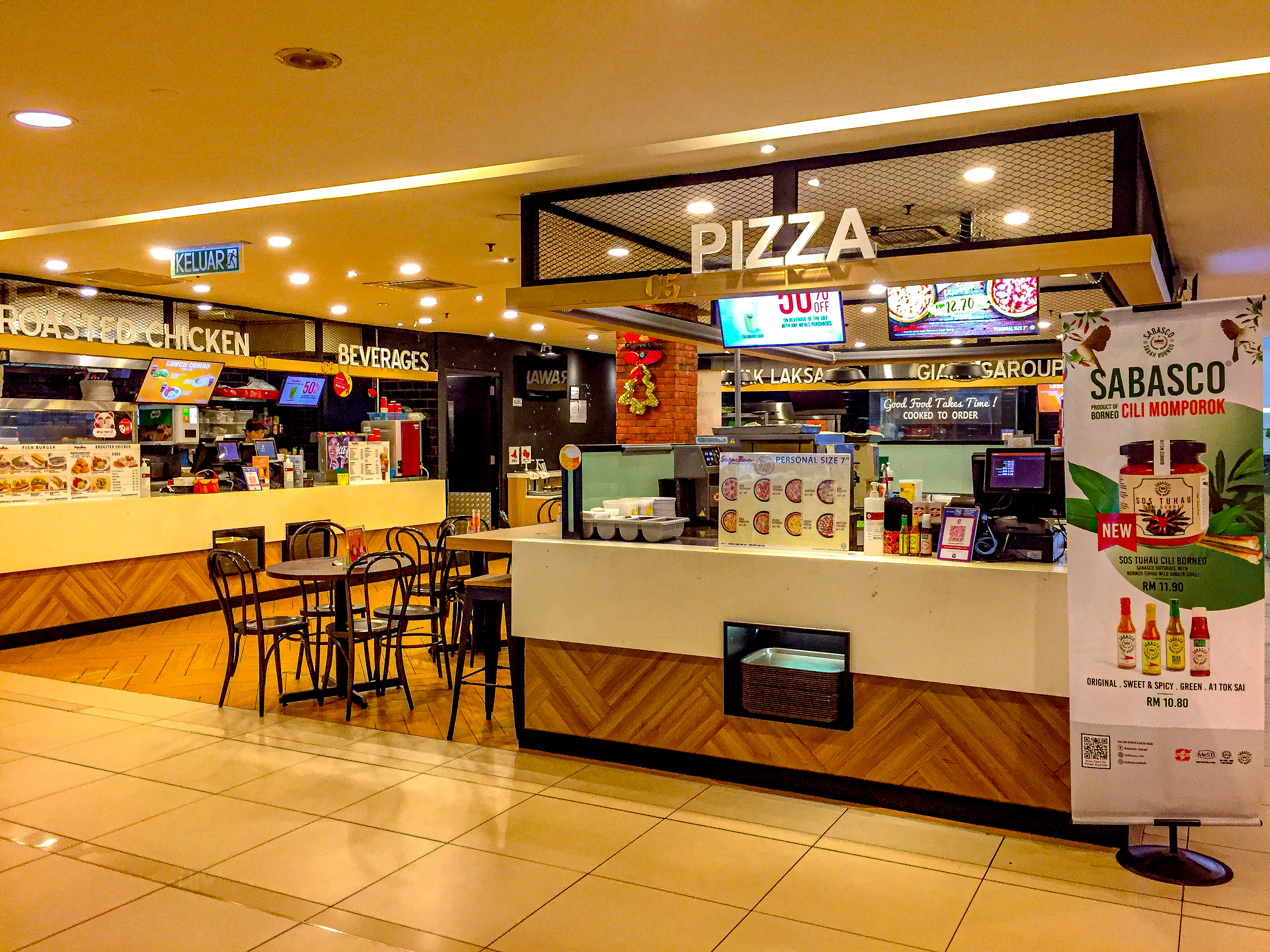
Interior of SugarBun - Borneo Asian Food, showcasing its multistall concept. The layout includes a broasted chicken and beverages stall (left), pizza stall (front), and a Sarawak laksa and Giant Garoupa stall (back), each offering a unique selection of meals and services.

During this period, numerous SugarBun outlets were strategically co-located with Applebee's Bakery and Caprilla Ice Cream Cafés, providing customers with a multifaceted dining experience all under one roof. This innovative approach aimed to offer patrons a diverse range of culinary options in a convenient setting. However, despite the initial success of these co-branded ventures, both Applebee's Bakery and Caprilla Ice Cream Cafés ceased operations by 2005 and have remained inactive since then.

In 2003, SugarBun had established a presence in over 50 restaurants domestically and abroad. This figure increased to 61 by 2012, with 53 establishments situated in Malaysia, six in Brunei, and one each in Bangladesh and China.

In January 2026, SugarBun opened its 165th outlet, branded as SugarBun Express, at EG Mall in Inanam, Kota Kinabalu, Sabah.

=== Innovative concepts and continued growth ===
SugarBun introduced its inaugural Drive-Thru concept in Malaysia with the launch of SugarBun located at Ulu Oya, Sibu in February 2015. This establishment, spanning two floors and occupying 9,333 square feet, marks the 59th addition to SugarBun's chain of restaurants in Sarawak.

In 2016, SugarBun introduced "SugarBun - Borneo Asian Food" in Kuala Lumpur, presenting a novel multi-stall concept aimed at enhancing efficiency and reducing service times. This initiative, available in selected outlets, offered patrons a taste of iconic dishes originating from East Malaysia, highlighting the region's unique flavours and culinary traditions. This innovative approach underscored SugarBun's aspiration to promote Malaysian Borneo cuisines on a broader scale.

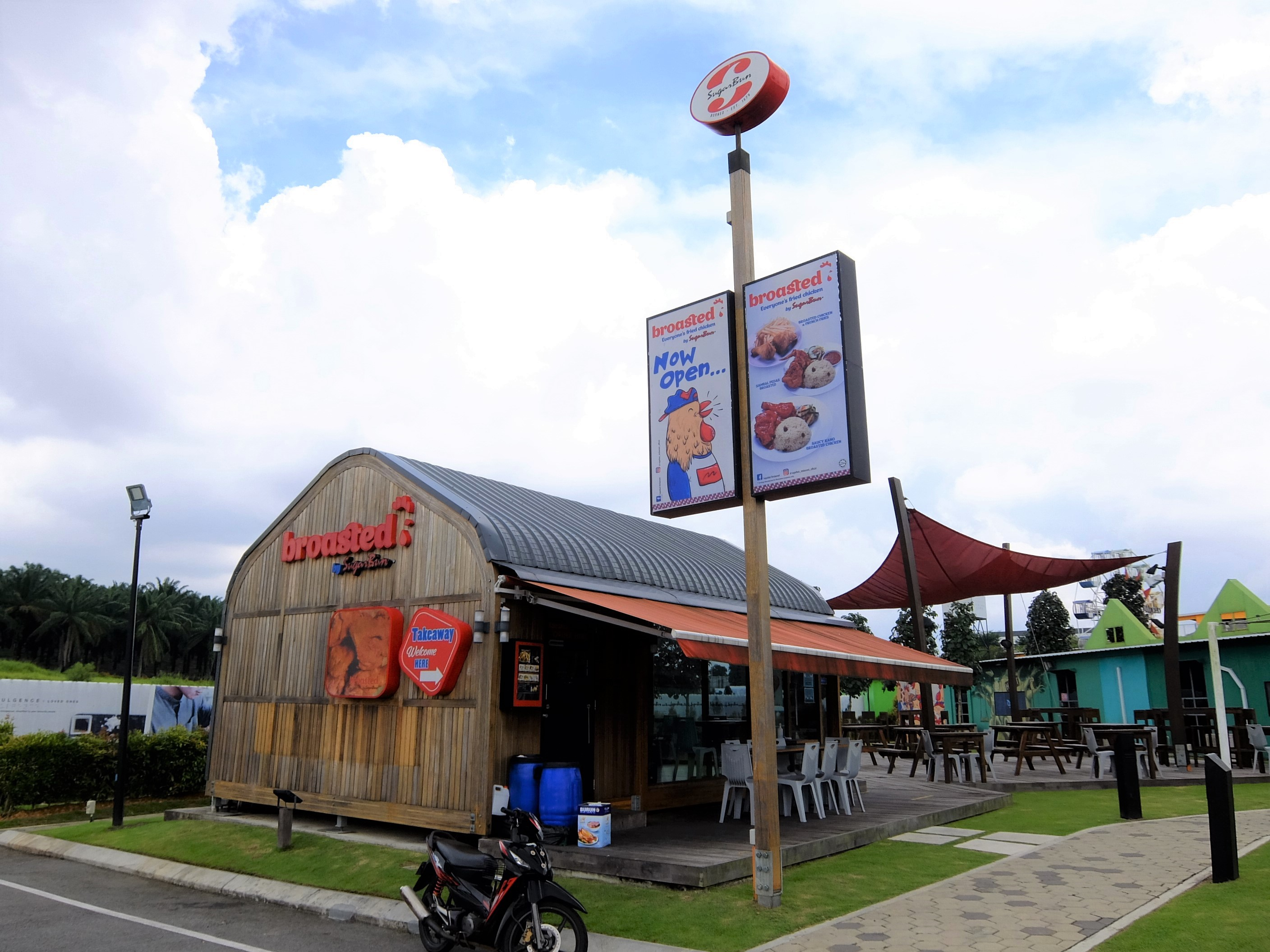
"Broasted by SugarBun", a food kiosk format that follows the Grab-n-Go model

Moreover, several SugarBun branches throughout Malaysia have adopted a co-branding approach with Pezzo, a major pizza establishment from Singapore. In Malaysia, these brands are affiliated as sister companies under Borneo Oil. This collaborative endeavour sees them operating together from shared premises, reintroducing the concept of co-location in many of their outlets.

Additionally, in 2016, SugarBun's total number rose to 84, with two located in the Klang Valley, eight in Brunei, one in Bangladesh and another in Melbourne, Australia. This expansion continued in 2019, reaching a total of 87 outlets.

SugarBun unveiled "Broasted by SugarBun" in 2017, marking its debut location in Gambang, Pahang. This innovative food kiosk adopted the Grab-n-Go model, with the goal of simplifying the SugarBun dining experience and offering convenient access to its signature offerings in a streamlined format. It has since been rebranded as "Broasted Chicken & Fish by SugarBun".

By 2023, SugarBun's steady growth trajectory brought its network close to reaching 100 outlets, marking a significant milestone in its expansion journey. This achievement underscored the notable progress and success of the company's growth strategy.

== Menu and products ==
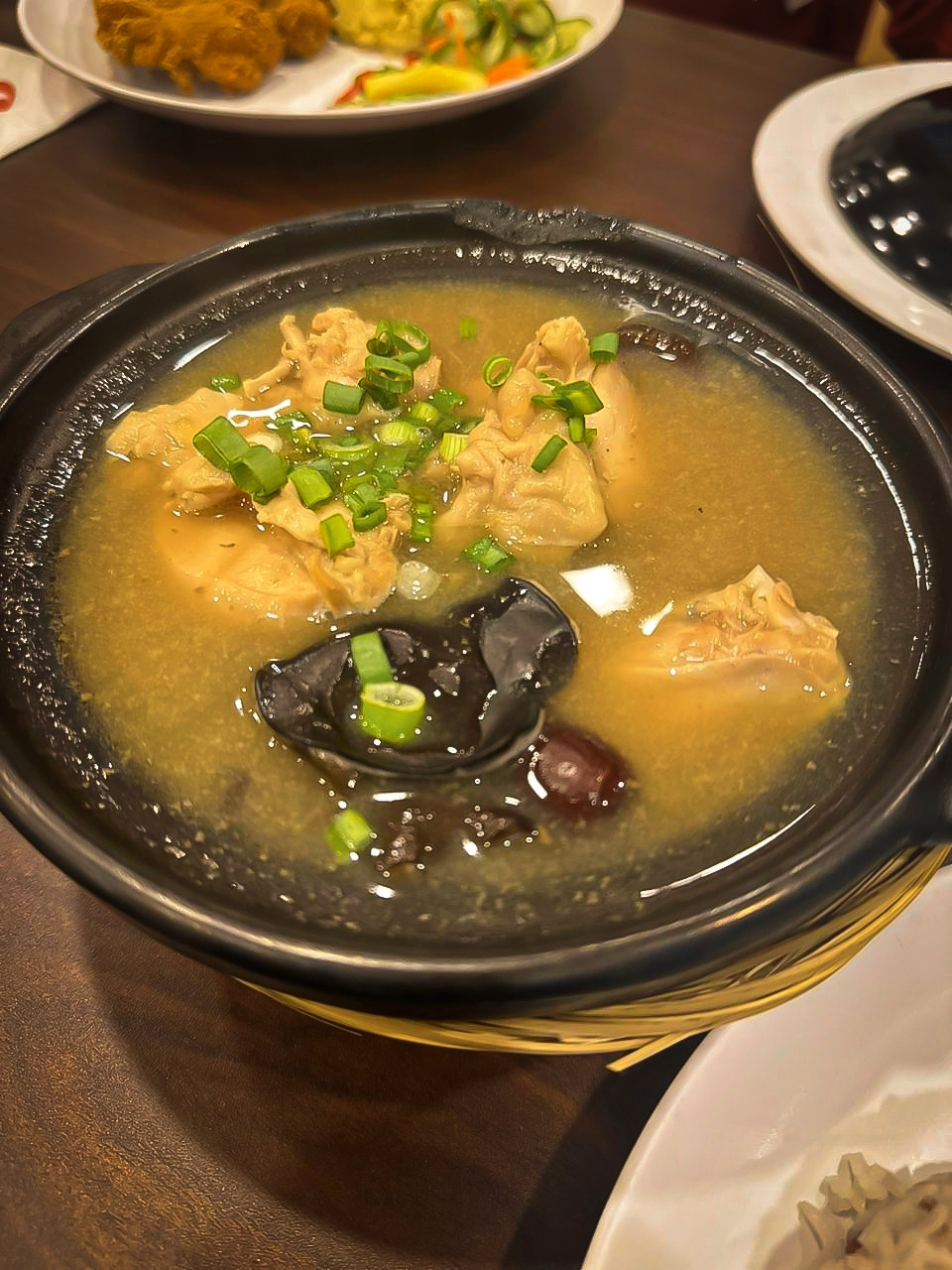
Chicken Mushroom Claypot: Featuring a wholesome broth with chicken, mushrooms, black fungus and red dates

The restaurant provides a varied menu to accommodate a broad customer base, from casual fast food to traditional comfort meals. Its production facility, situated in Kota Padawan, Sarawak, responsible for managing the pre-preparation of its menu choices.

Key highlights of the menu include SugarBun's Broasted Chicken, hailed as their top-selling item; additionally, patrons have the opportunity to savour a spicy variant of this popular dish known as Lak Lak Chicken. These dishes are often complemented with Savory Rice and pickles, which are considered signature accompaniments. Alternatively, mashed potatoes and coleslaw are available as options to complete the meal.

Furthermore, the menu features a selection of Western-influenced dishes, including Spaghetti, Fish fillet and savoury rice, Chickies (chicken breast fillets) and Fish and chips. Moreover, they also offer a diverse selection of burgers such as the classic Fish Burger, Swingger Burger, as well as Chicken and Beef options.

Patrons can also enjoy an array of Asian-inspired dishes, such as the Broasted Kano Meal with options for Pedas and Satay sauce. Traditional favourites include Laksa Sarawak, Sambal Eco-Fish, Garoupa Fried Rice, Nasi Lemak and Chicken Curry. Moreover, the menu boasts claypot specialties like Chicken Mushroom, Beef Stew and Assam Fish, served with a choice of mixed grain rice or steamed fragrant rice, depends on the outlet. The menu further offers a range of soups, including Chicken Mushroom Soup and Fish Soup.

In 2024, SugarBun expanded its menu to include Kolo Mee with minced chicken. The restaurant also introduced new beverages, such as Ais Gula Apong, Rainbow Jelly 3-Layer Tea and Air Bandung.

Apart from its diverse menu offerings, SugarBun also sells Borneo Specialty Sauce. This includes Sabasco sauce, originating from Sabah's momporok chili from Kunak, as well as Borneo Tuhau Wild Borneo Chilli.

The fast-food chain also provides a range of beverages, featuring popular choices like the three-layer tea, iced Milo and three-layer coffee. In 2019, SugarBun's franchisor, SB Supplies & Logistics Sdn Bhd, entered into a Memorandum of Understanding (MoU) with Coca-Cola Malaysia. This agreement grants Coca-Cola Malaysia the right to become the official soft drink provider at SugarBun and Pezzo East Malaysia outlets.

Notably, the restaurant is progressively eliminating the use of flavor enhancers like monosodium glutamate (MSG) in its culinary creations. This aligns with the growing demand for healthier dining options among its patrons.

== See also ==
- Malaysian cuisine
- Sarawakian cuisine
