= Sarawakian cuisine =

Regional cuisine of Malaysia

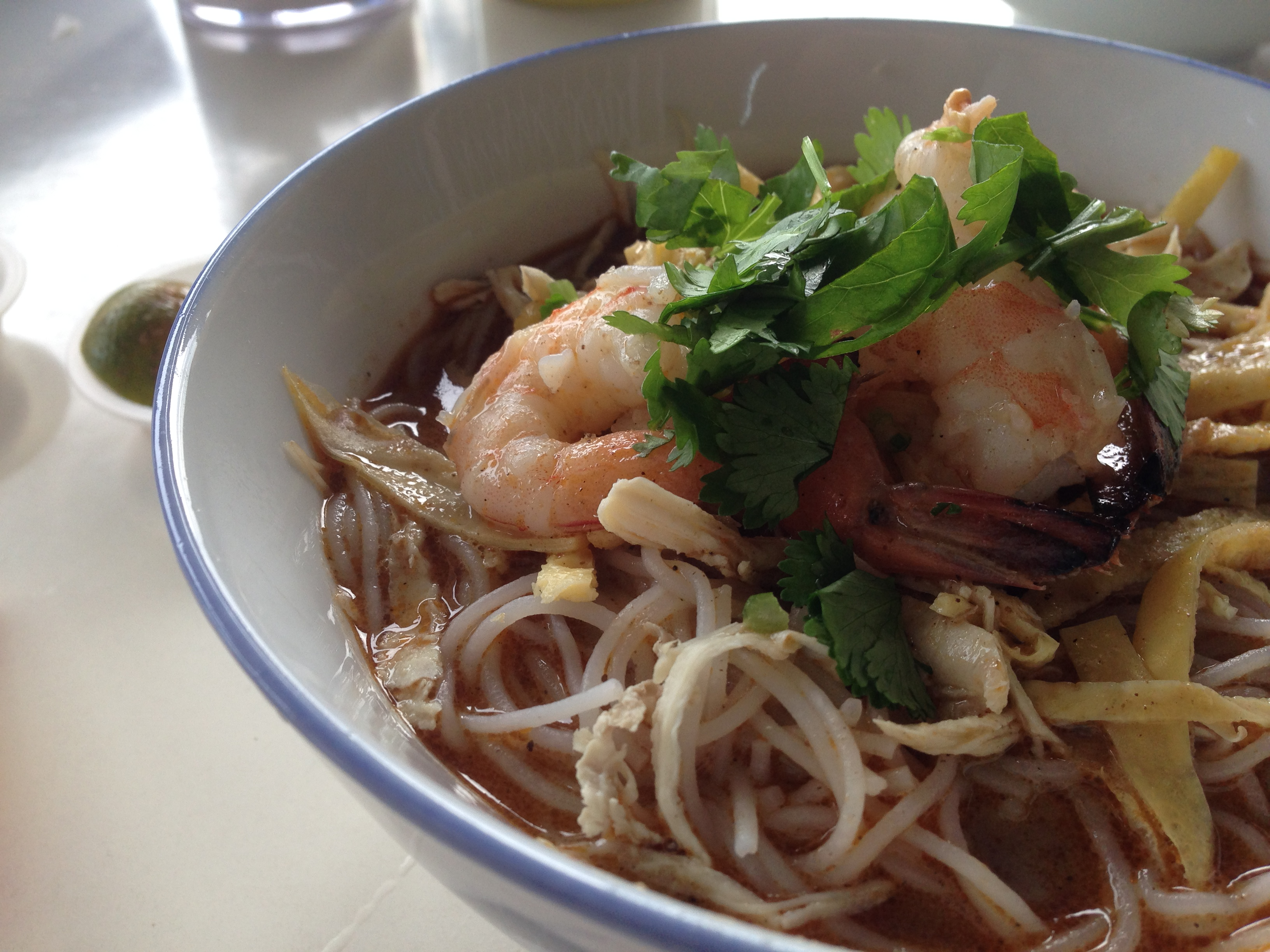
Laksa Sarawak is the de facto state dish of Sarawak

Sarawakian cuisine is a regional cuisine of Malaysia. Similar to the rest of Malaysian cuisine, Sarawak food is based on staples such as rice, while other ingredients and food preparations distinct from that of Peninsular Malaysia come from the influence of the state's varied geography, multi-ethnic populations and indigenous cultures. Sarawak cuisine is less spicy and more subtle in taste than elsewhere in Malaysia. It uses fresh seafood and natural herbs like turmeric, lemongrass, ginger, lime and tapioca leaves.

Each ethnic group has their own specialty dishes. Among the Iban, popular foods include tubu (stems), tuak (alcoholic beverage made from rice wine) and pansuh (dish cooked with bamboo). The Malay have bubur pedas (porridge) and kek lapis Sarawak (Sarawak layer cake); the Bidayuh have asam siok (chicken rice cooked in bamboo) and sup ponas Bidayuh (soup dish made of tapioca). The Melanau make tebaloi (Sago palm crackers), sagu (extracted from Sago palm) and umai (raw fish mixed with lime juice) and the Orang Ulu are known for garam barrio (Highlands salt), kikid (broth), tengayen (local young leaves), and urum giruq (pudding).

== Ingredients ==
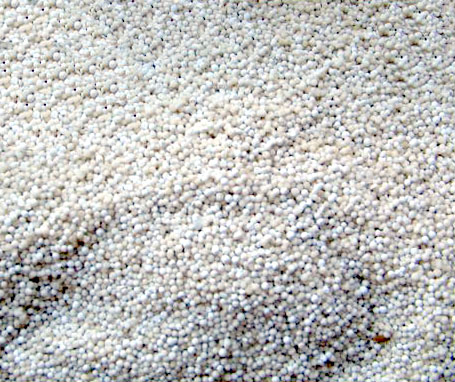
Sagu or Sago

Sarawak cuisine uses rice as a staple. It is most often steamed and always served with meat, fish and vegetable dishes. Rice is often eaten with the sauce or broth from the main dishes. Bario rice is a famous rice in Sarawak, which is named after the Sarawakian highlands where it is cultivated. It is regarded by the natives as the best and finest rice from the highlands of Sarawak. The rice, as per the natives, is known to be eaten only by the longhouse chief on special occasions although it is now available in Sarawak restaurants. In Sarawak, rice is often fried. Nasi aruk is a traditional Sarawakian Malay nasi goring or fried rice. Unlike common nasi goreng, nasi aruk does not use any oil to fry the rice. The rice must be fried for longer (compared to frying rice for nasi goreng) for the smokey/slightly burnt taste to absorb into the rice. Sago or sagu is the traditional staple food of the Melanau people in Sarawak. The bud of the sago palm is cooked as a traditional dish in Sarawak. The bud is sliced or cut up and often stewed with coconut milk and dried anchovies with spices. Linut or sago porridge is made by pouring boiling water into a bowl of sago starch. Normally linut will be served together with the sambal belacan and other side dishes. The texture is very gooey and sticky and mostly eaten with a wooden fork. Tebaloi is a Sarawak sweet cracker made from sago starch, egg, coconut and sugar, flattened until thin and roasted until crisp. Tetubei is another sago dish in Sarawak. It is a traditional Melanau food made from sago starch. A variety of fruits and vegetables is often used in cooking. Midin, also called Stenochlaena palustris, paku midin, or lemidin, is a popular vegetable in Sarawak. It is a sun-loving plant that thrives in open areas, usually on swampy land. Common habitats are disturbed forests, secondary forests, rubber gardens, oil palm plantations, river banks and roadsides. Midin is usually served in two ways – fried with either garlic or belacan (shrimp paste). The most popular dish that uses midin is midin goreng belacan. Buah dabai, or Canarium odontophyllum in the family Burseraceae, is a native fruit from Sarawak that is used in cooking. Dabai is grown exclusively on the island of Borneo, in the Rajang River basin of central Sarawak, from the interior areas of Kapit all the way out to Sibu and Sarikei on the coast. It is one of the unique foods of Sarawak. The dabai fruit is slightly bigger than a kalamata olive, with a thin, bluish-black skin. Nasi goreng dabai is a Sarawak speciality fried rice in which the main ingredient is buah dabai. The rice is fried with soy sauce, garlic, shallot, chilli, oyster sauce along with dabai and accompanied by other ingredients, particularly egg. The combination of tomatoes, garlic (bawang putih), and onions is found in many dishes in Sarawak. The most important spice in Sarawakian cuisine is pepper. Pepper is commercially produced on an industrial scale as a cash crop, and the preferred choice by local cooks when heat is wanted in a dish. Granted geographical indication (GI) status by the Malaysian Intellectual Property Organisation (MyIPO), Sarawak black pepper is highly regarded by international culinary figures such as Alain Ducasse. Maize, pumpkins and yams are widely used in Sarawakian cuisine. Maize is grown around the same time as padi while pumpkins around the tilled rice and maize fields. Yams are also grown on the peripherals of padi farms.

Meat staples include chicken, pork, beef, and fish. Seafood is popular as a result of the bodies of water surrounding the archipelago. Popular catches include semah, ikan keli, baong, empuarah and prawns. Also popular are meat from deer, wild boars and even bears. Birds can be shot with blowpipes. Guns are not often used because cartridges are beyond the means of many indigenous people. Punai is another small bird the natives of Sarawak catch with sticky nets, and eat after roasting them over a small charcoal fire. Deep-fried punai is often available as part of lelapan (halal) in Miri. Jungle vegetables are found up the hills and down the valleys, and some even by the riverbanks picked out by ancestors of the natives. Palms like pantu, nipah, nibong, coconut and sago continue to be important umbut or upah or shoots the indigenous people retain as delicacies. Native cuisine differs from other cuisines in its simplicity and directness of flavor. The use of wild ginger, daun bungkang and jungle leaves can bring subtle flavours to various dishes.

== Method of cooking ==
Commonly, cooking methods adopted in Sarawakian food are menumis (stir frying), menggoreng (frying), bakar (grilling) and rebus (boiling). Each ethnic group in Sarawak has different styles of preparing, cooking, preserving and eating styles of food. The Orang Ulu, for instance, use garam barrio to preserve meat, fish and vegetables, which is called mengasam. The Iban cook and eat lulun, rice which is cooked in bamboo. Other than that, the traditional cooking methods of the Iban people are also called pansoh or pansuh, which is the preparation and cooking of food in bamboo tubes. Ingredients like poultry, fish, vegetables or rice are mixed with fragrant herbs like lemongrass, tapioca leaves and bungkang leaves (a species of myrtle from the Eugenia genus), then sealed within the bamboo tubes and placed directly over an open fire. The mixture needs to be stuffed into the bamboo logs and chopped tapioca leaves are stuffed at the opening of the logs. Cooking food this way will infuse it with aroma and flavour from the bamboo tubes while keeping it moist. Geographically, the large forest area and style of living have affected the ways native groups' traditional foods were created, prepared and cooked using natural resources. These food treasures, in turn, have contributed to the uniqueness of Sarawakian cuisine.

== Popular dishes ==
Popular dishes in the state include Sarawak laksa, kolo mee, sayur midin belacan, tomato mee, linut and ayam pansuh. The state is also known for its Sarawak layer cake dessert. Each ethnic group has its own delicacies with different styles of preparing, cooking, and eating food. However, modern technology has altered the methods of cooking native dishes. Examples of ethnic foods are Malay bubur pedas (porridge), the Iban tuak (rice wine) and manok pansoh (bamboo chicken), Bidayuh asam siok (chicken rice)), Melanau tebaloi (sago palm crackers) and umai (raw fish mixed with lime juice), and Orang Ulu urum giruq (pudding). The traditional food of Sarawak has been marketed as a culinary tourism product.

In September 2021, Sarawak Laksa was named the best dish in Asia according to readers' feedback on TasteAtlas.

== Common dishes ==
Sarawak is notable for its rice; currently three varieties grown in Sarawak have been granted geographical indication status by MyIPO. Among the foods and beverages particular to Sarawak are:

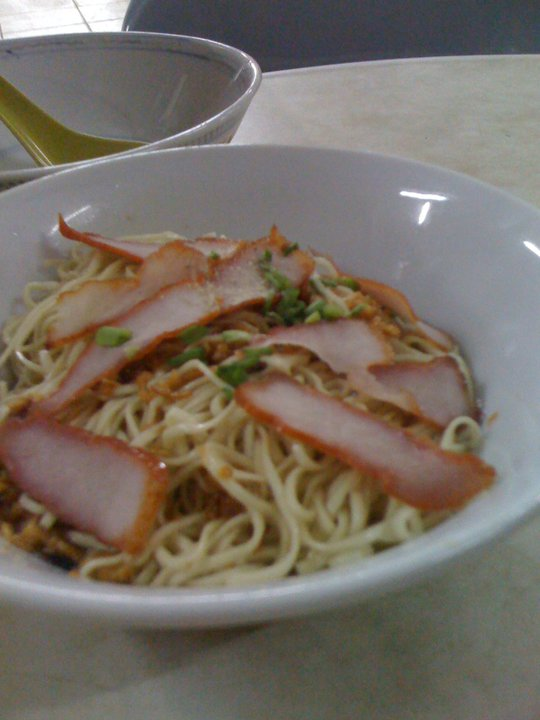
Kolo mee

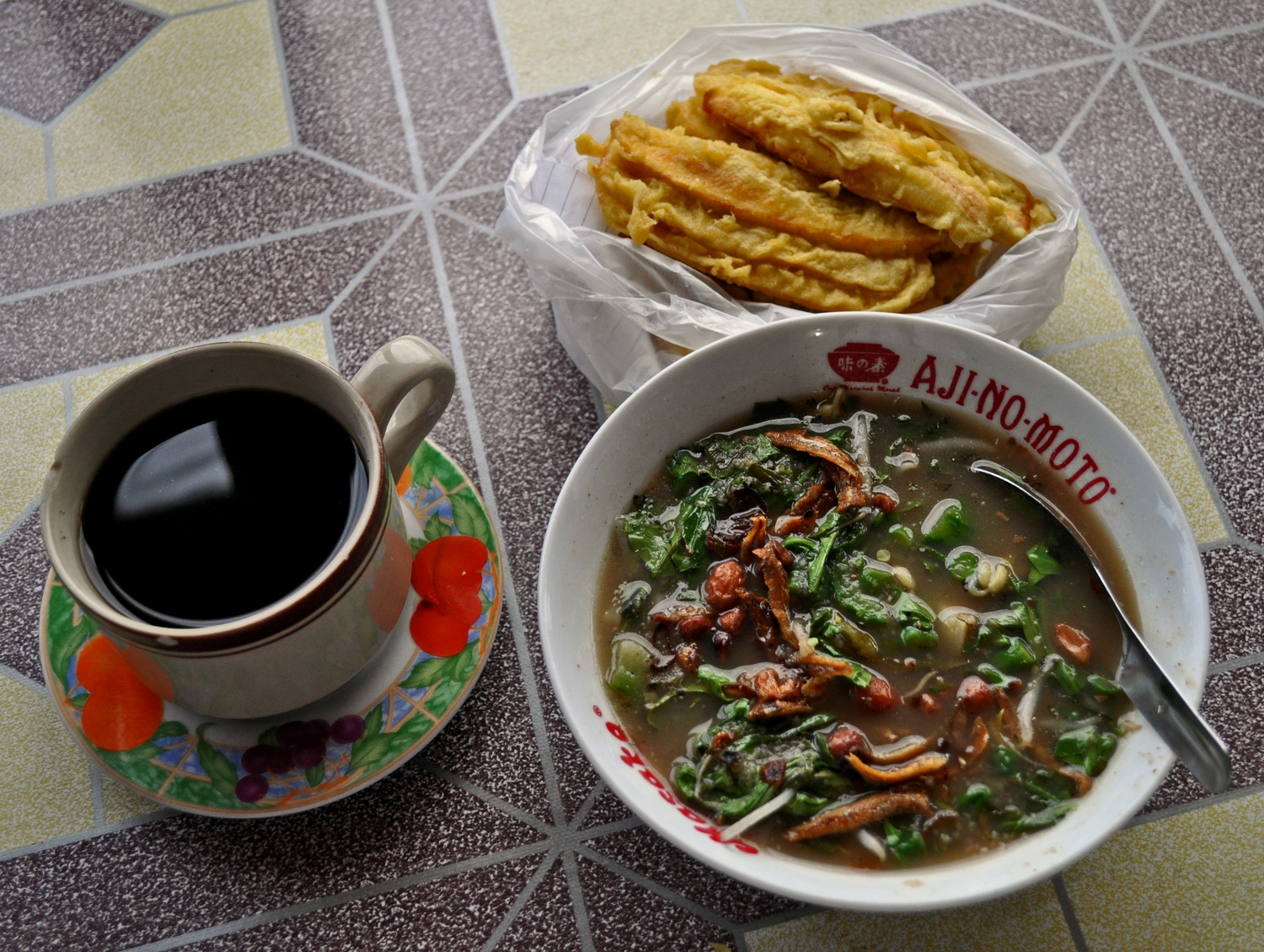
Bubur pedas

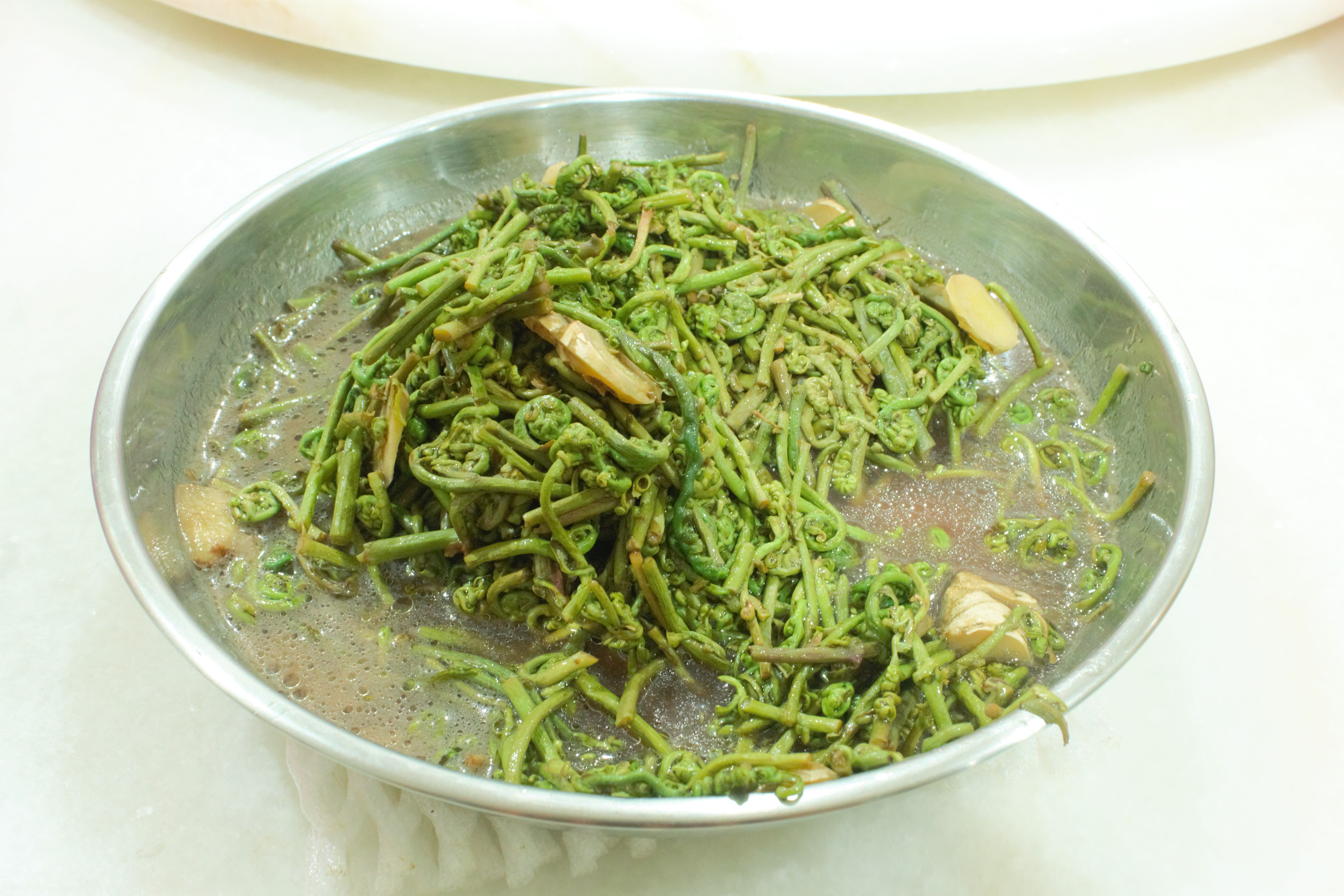
Stir-fried "Midin"

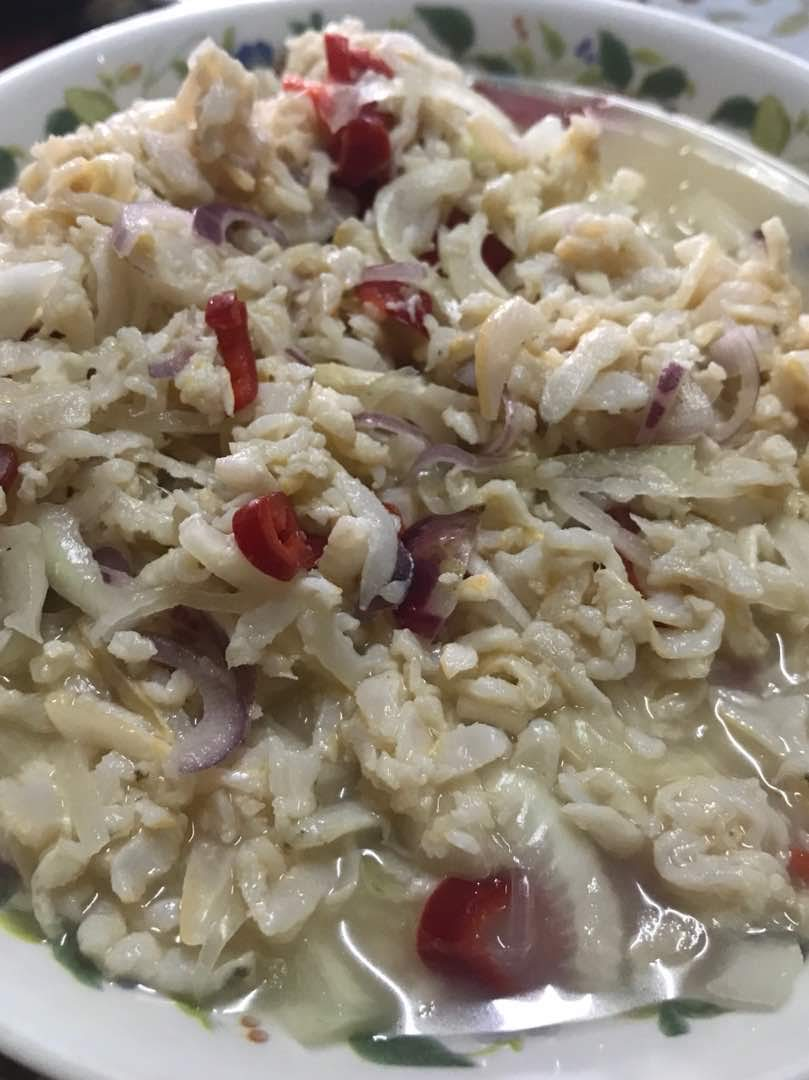
A bowl of umai.

- Acar timun Sarawak or Sarawak acar timun or pickled cucumber is a popular Malay dish in Sarawak. It is very different from West Malaysia's acar. It is preserved in vinegar and sugar for days, weeks or even months before being served. As such, the pickles are sweet and sour and full of turmeric and other spice flavours. The julienning of the cucumber is much thinner and longer than nonya acar and they usually do not use cabbage. Julienned carrot is usually used for the purpose of adding colour to the acar. Another distinction of Sarawak acar is that it is eaten with keropok ikan or fish crackers.
- Asam siok is a Bidayuh chicken rice that is cooked in bamboo. Asam siok is a Bidayuh delicacy served normally during special occasions such as Gawai and gatherings. This combination includes whole chicken, steamed rice, salt, ginger, lemongrass, tapioca leaves and a small amount of water to boil.
- Bee pang is a Chinese traditional type of crispy rice cake that is popular in Sarawak.
- Belacan bihun is rice vermicelli dressed in a gravy made from ground chillies, belacan, tamarind, and dried shrimp. It is garnished with cured cuttlefish, julienned cucumber, bean sprouts and century egg wedges.
- Bubur kapu is an Iban rice flour dessert or chendol.
- Bubur pedas is a type of rice congee cooked with a specially prepared spice paste, or rempah made from turmeric, lemon grass, galangal, chillies, ginger, coconut and shallots. A fairly complex and spicy dish compared to most typical congee preparations, bubur pedas is often prepared during the month of Ramadan and served during the breaking of the fast.
- Stir-fried cangkuk manis is sayur manis or sweet leaf stir-fried with red peppers, shallots, garlic, oyster sauce and egg.
- Daun ubi tumbuk or pucuk ubi tumbuk is a preparation of cassava leaves (known as empasak by the Iban) which has the consistency of pesto, and is widely eaten among Sarawak's native communities. The pounded leaves may be sauteed with seasonings like anchovies and chilli, stuffed into a bamboo tube and roasted over an open fire, or simply boiled with shallot, fat and salt.
- Gula mitai is Sarawak's candy floss. It is made by melting sugar and then pulling and folding it as the sugar cools – like hand-pulled noodles.
- Ikan terubuk masin is salt-preserved toli shad, which is endemic to the coastal waters of Sarawak, stretching from Sematan to Lawas. It is considered an iconic delicacy in Sarawak, and thus a prized edible gift.
- Kasam ensabi is a fermented vegetable pickle made from an indigenous cultivar of mustard greens (ensabi) and is traditional to the Iban community.
- Kolo mee or mee kolok is a dish of springy egg noodles tossed in a sweet and savoury shallot, lard and vinegar dressing, and topped with seasoned minced pork and char siu. It is similar to Peninsular-style Hakka mee or wonton mee in concept, but differs significantly in taste profile. A popular variant uses rendered oil from cooking char siu to flavour kolo mee instead of plain lard, which gives the noodles a reddish hue. Halal versions of kolo mee replace the pork components with beef (earning the moniker of mee sapi) or chicken, and lard with peanut or vegetable oil. Additional toppings can include mushrooms, chicken and crab meat. Kampua mee is a similar dish from Sibu of Fuzhou origin.
- Kompia is Chinese bread made with meat, onions, salt and flour. A ball of flour is stuffed with a filling of other desired ingredients and flattened with a rolling pin. It is then slapped onto the sides of a traditional home-made Chinese oven and takes approximately 15 minutes to bake.
- Kuching Siew pau is a Chinese baked bun with meat filling.
- Laksa Sarawak or kuching laksa is noodles (usually rice vermicelli) served in an aromatic spiced coconut milk soup, topped with shredded chicken, shredded omelette, bean sprouts, prawns, and garnished with coriander. This dish has received endorsement by an American celebrity chef Anthony Bourdain in 2015.
- Linut is a staple food for the Melanau people. It is made of sago flour mixed with hot or boiling water.
- Manok kacangma is a Chinese-influenced dish, traditionally eaten by local women during confinement after giving birth. It consists of chicken pieces cooked with ginger and kacangma, often seasoned with some Chinese wine or tuak by non-Muslim cooks.
- Manok pansoh is the most typical Iban pansoh preparation of chicken seasoned with bungkang leaves, lemongrass, ginger, and tapioca leaves, then stuffed into a bamboo tube and roasted in the uma avok (traditional fireplace). A related Bidayuh dish is asam siok, with the addition of rice to the chicken mixture. These dishes are not commonly found in urban eateries and restaurants due to the practicality of roasting a bamboo tube over an open fire within a typical commercial kitchen.
- Mee sapi is a noodle dish which typically uses noodles similar to kolok mee. However, mee sapi is different in the sense that it is served with a beef-based broth and topped with generous amounts of beansprouts and beef slices.
- Midin is a vegetable dish where the young fronds of the Stenochlaena palustris fern are stir-fried with garlic, dry shrimps or shrimp paste (belacan).
- Nasi aruk Sarawak is a traditional Sarawakian Malay nasi goreng or fried rice. Unlike nasi goreng, nasi aruk does not use any oil to fry the rice. The ingredients are garlic, onion and anchovies, fried with very little oil and then rice. The rice must be fried for a longer time (compared to frying rice for nasi goreng) for the smoky or slightly burnt taste to absorb into the rice. It is common to see nasi aruk on the menu at Malay coffee shops and stalls throughout Sarawak.
- Nasi goreng dabai is rice stir-fried with dabai (Canarium odontophyllum), an indigenous fruit found only in Sarawak. It is often compared to an olive, due to its similarity in appearance as well as taste. As dabai is highly perishable and seasonal in nature, this dish is also prepared with preserved dabai paste.
- Nasi goreng ikan terubuk masin is a Sarawak specialty which is made of fried rice served with fried salt-preserved toli shad.
- Nasi lelapan is a rice dish that is popular in Miri, Sarawak. Usually, there is one main dish (either fried fish, chicken or sliced of beef) accompanied by seven side dishes (mainly fresh vegetables, ulam, tempe, fried tofu) and sambal belacan (chilli blended with shrimp paste). This hot dish is served with steamed rice.
- Nasi mak entek is a rice dish served with chicken, baked beans, boiled egg and sambal belacan (chilli paste). This dish is popular in Samarahan, Sarawak.
- Nuba laya is cooked bario rice which is mashed and wrapped in leaves of the phacelophrynium maximum plant. It is considered the centerpiece of a meal for the Lun Bawang and Kelabit people. Accompaniments may include a small bowl of porridge (kikid), shredded beef cooked with wild ginger and dried chilli (labo senutuq), deboned shredded fish (a'beng), wild jungle vegetables prepared in various ways, and so on.
- Roti canai goreng Kapit or Kapit fried flatbread is a unique and popular dish in Kapit, Sarawak. The flat bread is composed of dough containing fat, flour, and water that is fried in oil. It is fluffy inside but crispy and flaky outside. It is served hot with chicken curry and hot spicy sauce (sambal).
- Sio bee is Kuching's version of siu mai. It is popular among the Chinese in Sarawak. The difference between siu mai and sio bee is that siu mai contains pork and shrimp while sio bee is stuffed only with pork.
- Sinamu baka is a Lun Bawang/Lundayeh traditional food. This is a tangy fermented food same like Bosuo but the differences is Sinamu Baka only suitable for wild bear meat.
- Sup Terung Dayak is a popular soup dish made with a native cultivar of wild eggplant, which is spherical in shape and slightly larger than a navel orange. Also called terung asam due to its natural tart flavour, this eggplant species comes in bright hues ranging from yellow to orange. Other ingredients for the soup may include fish, prawns, or fish products (dried, salted or smoked fish).
- Sup paku kubok is a hairy fern soup cooked with ikan bilis (anchovy) and ginger.
- Sup ponas Bidayuh is a Bidayuh soup dish made of tapioca, lemongrass and other herbs.
- Tebaloi is a sago biscuit snack which is traditionally associated with the Melanau people of Sarawak.
- Tomato mee is a noodle dish in tomato sauce.
- Umai is a traditional Melanau food, accompanied with a bowl of baked or toasted sago pearls. There are two different versions of umai – the traditional sambal campur and a more contemporary variation called sambal cecah jeb. The former is a raw seafood salad which consists of raw sliced seafood (anything from freshwater and seawater fish, prawns and even jellyfish) cured in calamansi lime juice, tossed with ground peanuts, sliced onions and chilies. For umai jeb, the raw sliced seafood is undressed, and is simply dipped into a spicy sauce for consumption.

== Beverages ==
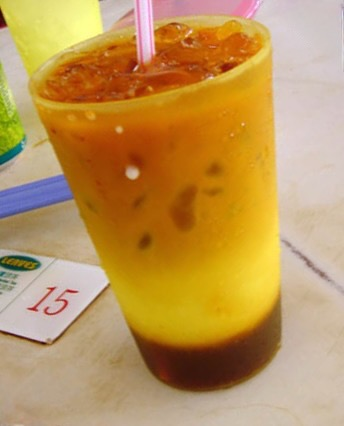
Teh C Peng Special

=== Non-alcoholic beverages ===
Teh C Peng Special is a local tea in Sarawak. Its name is derived from the local speak for iced (peng) tea (teh) with evaporated milk (C). This tea is an iced concoction of brewed tea, evaporated milk and gula apong (nirah palm sugar) syrup, carefully presented without stirring in three or more layers. Originally from Kuching, its consumption has spread to other areas of Sarawak as well as neighbouring Sabah. Another drink is the White Lady; a shaved iced concoction with evaporated milk, mango juice, longan and pineapple. Invented in 1975 by a Kuching hawker, multiple variations are sold in various hawker stalls throughout the city.

=== Alcoholic beverages ===
Tuak is a type of traditional alcoholic beverage in Sarawak's Dayak communities. It is made with glutinous rice or a mixture of fragrant rice and glutinous rice or just fragrant rice. The process of making tuak involves fermentation of the cooked rice where the starch in the rice is converted into sugar, which is then fermented to produce alcohol. However, there is no accepted convention or definition on what constitutes tuak. Tuak is essentially an alcoholic drink produced by fermenting anything that contains carbohydrates, as long as it is made in Sarawak by Sarawakians. Tuak is normally served as a welcoming drink to guests, and as an important component for ritual events and festive occasions like Gawai and Christmas. Another type of a stronger alcoholic drink is called langkau, which contains a higher alcohol content because it is actually made of tuak which has been distilled over fire to boil off the alcohol, cooled and collected into containers. The Bidayuh also use distilling methods to make arak tonok, a kind of moonshine. The Bidayuh in particular are known for their skill and expertise in brewing tuak: ingredients for tuak variants include sugarcane (tepui), tampoi (a wild fruit with a sweet and tart flavour), pineapples and apples. Tepui is an alcoholic drink which is quite similar to tuak. Because it is made out of sugarcane juice, this alcoholic drink is both a smooth and soothing drink, compared to tuak and langkau. Normally, Bidayuh people drink tepui right after dinner.

== Cakes ==
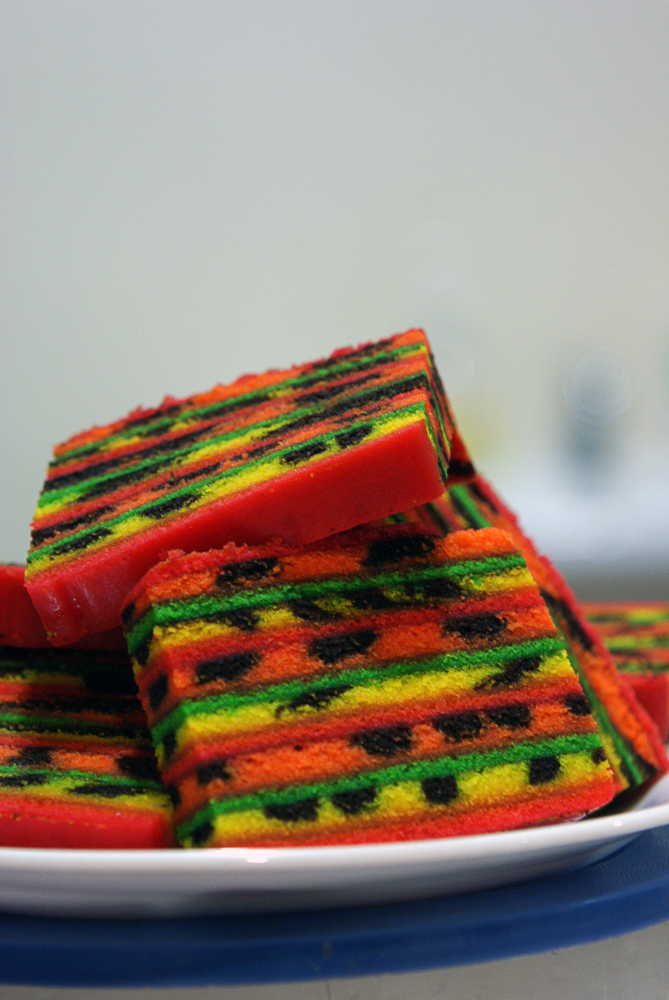
A colourful Sarawak layer cake

Kek lapis Sarawak or Sarawak layer cake is a layered cake, with layers made in different flavours and decorated in varying complexity. It is a specialty of the Malay in Sarawak that is served during festive seasons and special occasions. They are often baked for religious or cultural celebrations such as Eid ul-Fitr, Christmas, birthdays and weddings. People in Malaysia practice an open house on feast days, where the cake is eaten or gifted.

== See also ==
- List of Malaysian dishes
- Malaysian cuisine
- Penang cuisine
- Sabahan cuisine
