= Mee siput =

Malaysian noodle dish and snack

Mee siput muar مي سيڤوت موار
- Traditional mee siput muar with sambal
- Alternative names: Mee siput
- Type: Snack
- Place of origin: Malaysia
- Region or state: Muar, Johor, Malaysia
- Main ingredients: Wheat flour, cooking oil

Mee siput muar (Jawi: مي سيڤوت موار), or simply mee siput, is a cracker which originated from and is commonly available in Muar, Johor, Malaysia.

Mee siput muar is traditionally and originally hand-made of flour dough which is rolled, stretched into long noodle-like strips or strings before being swirled in a circular spiral pattern to resemble the shell of a siput, or snail in Malay. They are dried in the sun before being deep-fried in cooking oil until crispy and crunchy. The ready-to-eat snack may be served with condiments like sambal, chili paste or chili soya sauce. Beside its spiral snail-shell shape which has contributed to the name of mee siput, the so-called snail noodle cracker also has a crispy texture similar to the light, brittle feeling of a snail shell once it breaks in the mouth.

In present times, the factory and machinery produced mee siput mostly were not made in the traditional "snail shell" form, but rather in a randomly swirled pattern due to mass production for durability, efficiency and commercial reasons.

Spiral-pattern shape of mee siput

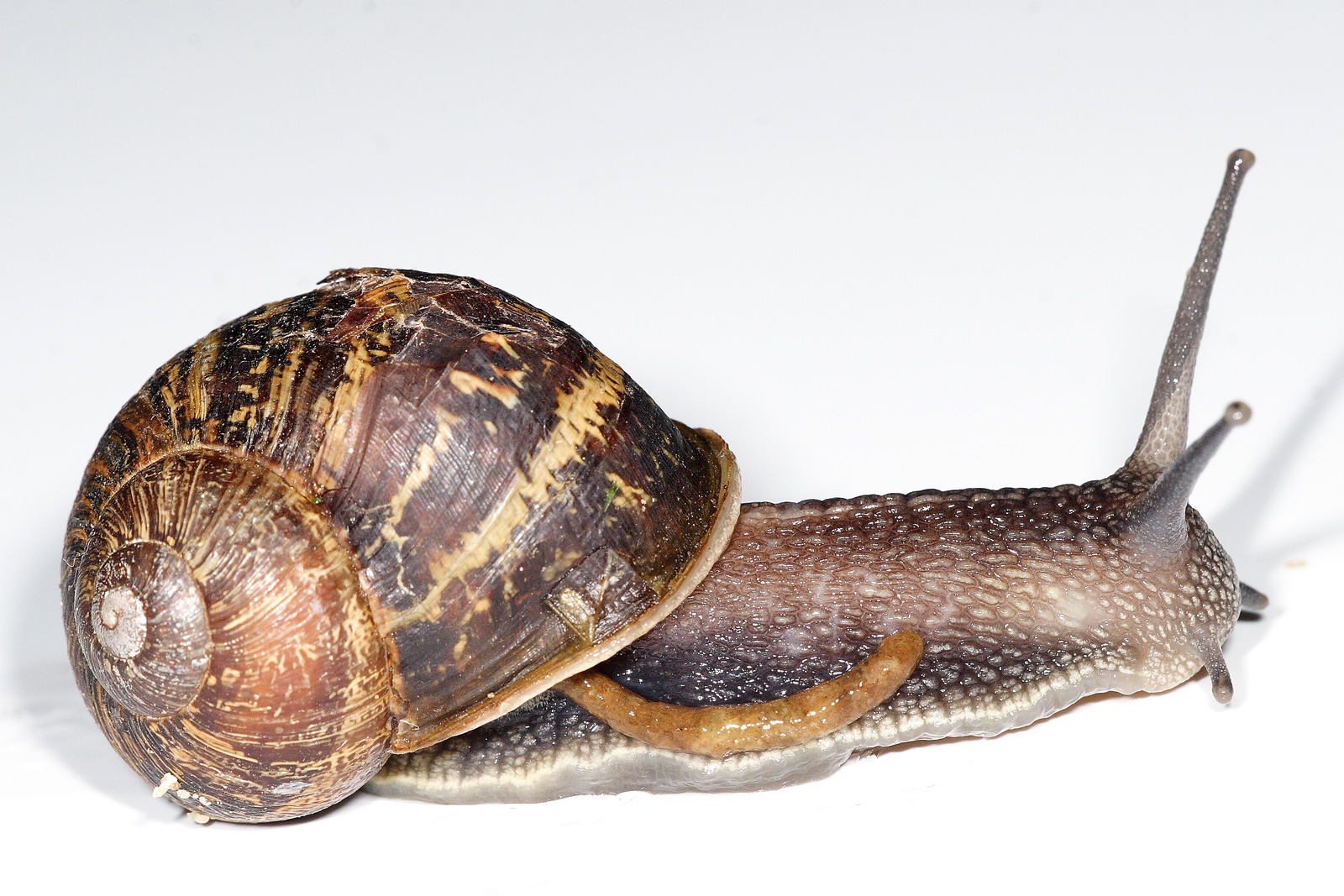
Look of a garden snail.

A ready-to-eat original mee siput

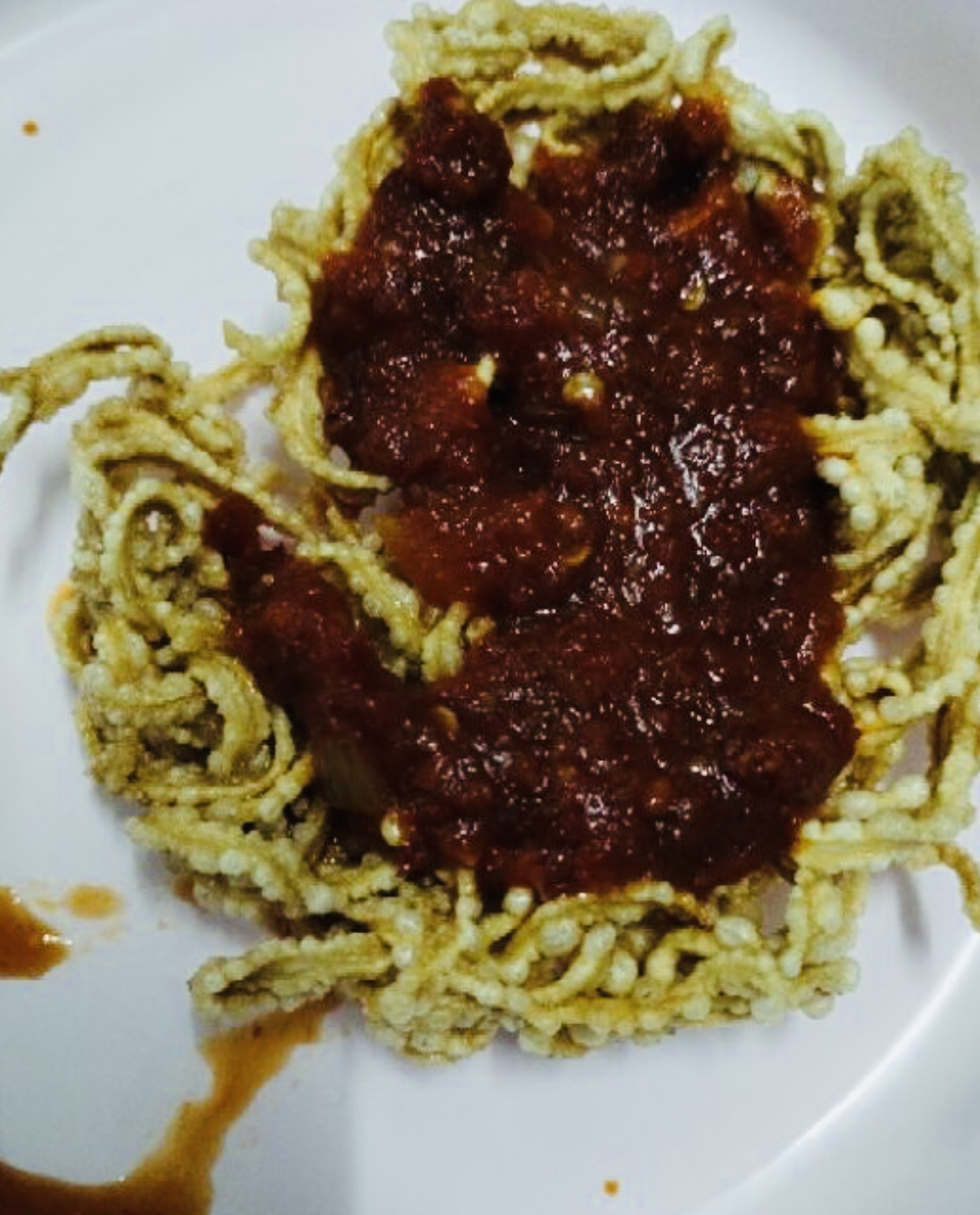
Present commercialised mee siput

== See also ==
- List of Malaysian dishes
- Malaysian cuisine
- Funnel cake
- Chakchak
- Sachima
