= Nasi paprik =

Malaysian rice dish

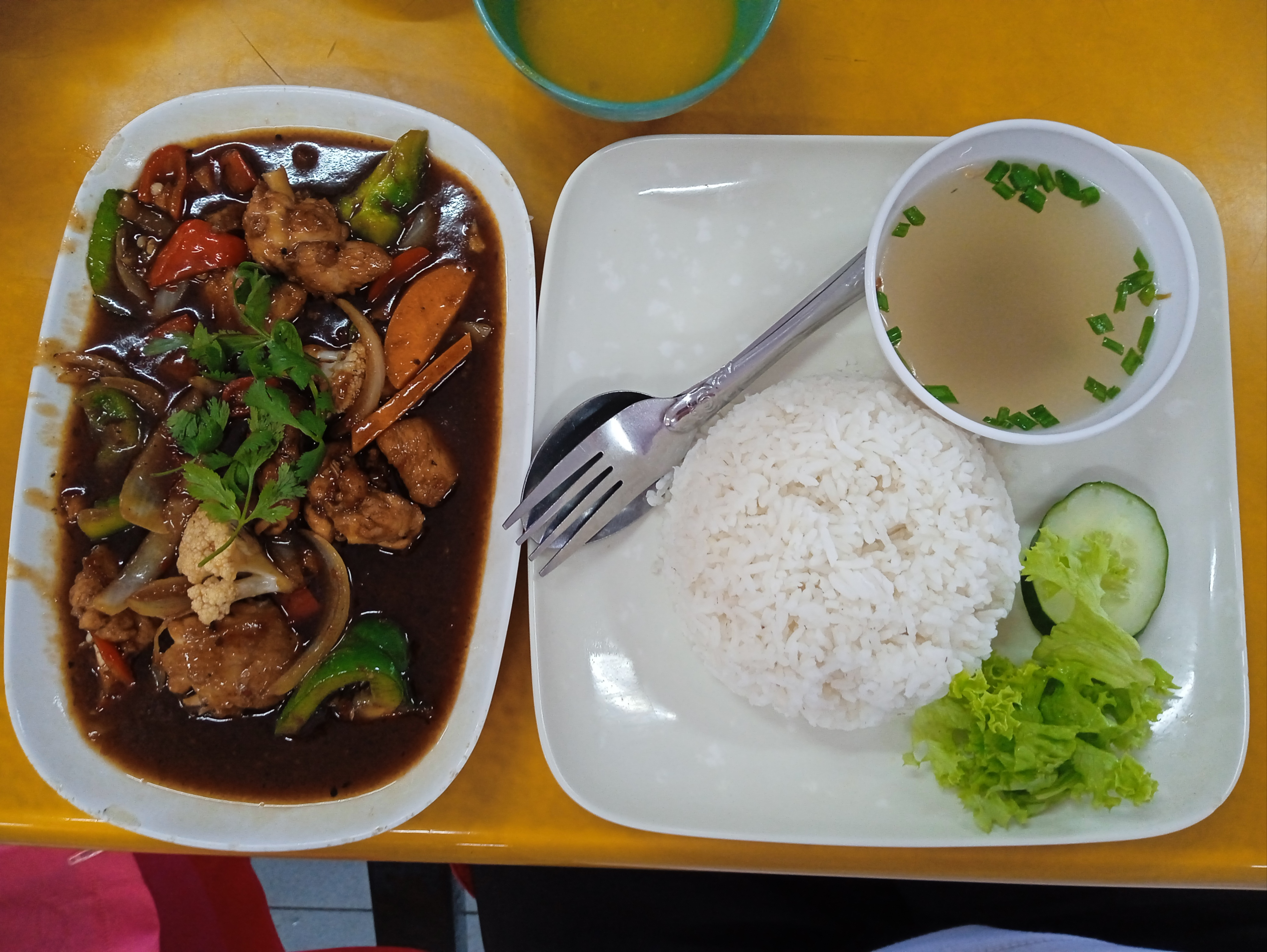
- Type: Fried rice
- Place of origin: Malaysia
- Associated cuisine: Malaysian cuisine
- Main ingredients: Rice, egg, chicken, chili sauce, cucumber

Nasi paprik or nasi pad prik is a Malaysian dish of rice, either plain or fried, served alongside a sweet and spicy sauce, commonly containing chunks of meat and vegetable. Nasi goreng pad prik may refer specifically to the fried rice, with the sauce mixed in during cooking. Nasi is Malay for rice, and pad prik is a Thai phrase: ผัด (pad, meaning stirfry) and พริก (prik, meaning chili). Nasi pad prik can be considered ‘Malay-style Thai cuisine,’ in that it is mainly found in Malaysia, but is prepared with Thai ingredients and cooking principles.

== See also ==
- Malaysian cuisine
- Fried rice
- Nuea phat phrik
- Phat phrik khing
