= Puding diraja =

Pudding served to Malay royal family

Puding diraja ڤوديڠ دراج
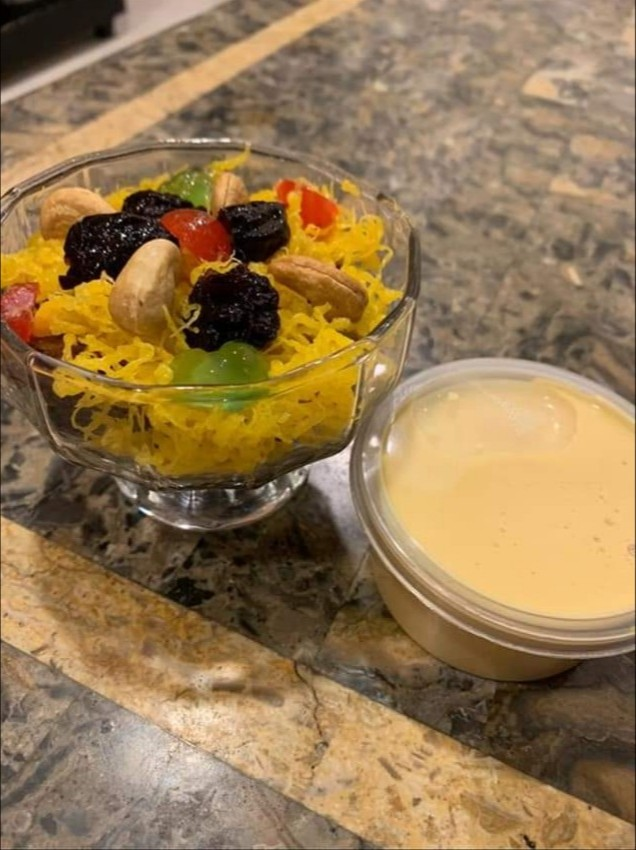
- Alternative names: Puding raja, pudéang deghaje
- Type: Pudding
- Course: Dessert
- Place of origin: Malaysia
- Region or state: Pekan, Pahang
- Created by: Malay
- Main ingredients: Banana, evaporated milk, jala mas, prunes, candied cherries and cashew nuts

Puding diraja (Pahang Hilir: pudéang deghaje; Jawi: ڤوديڠ دراج) also known as royal pudding, is a dessert that was developed and served to the royal family of the Malaysian state of Pahang.

Its basic ingredients are pisang lemak manis (a local cultivar of banana), evaporated milk, prunes, candied cherries and cashew nuts. The pudding is garnished with jala mas and served with a cold sauce made from milk and cornflour. It is commonly served during Ramadan as well as on weekends as a special afternoon tea treat for the family.

== See also ==
- Cuisine of Malaysia
