= Agar Agar =

French electropop duo

- Origin: France
- Genres: Electropop; synth-pop
- Years active: 2015–present
- Labels: Cracki Records; Sony France
- Members: Clara Cappagli; Armand Bultheel

Agar Agar is a French electropop duo consisting of Clara Cappagli and Armand Bultheel. Formed in 2015, the group released its debut studio album, The Dog and the Future, in 2018, followed by Player Non Player in 2023.

== History ==
Cappagli and Bultheel met at art school and began performing together in 2015. Their early releases appeared on Cracki Records.

The duo released the EP Cardan in 2016. Their debut studio album, The Dog and the Future, was released in 2018 through Cracki Records and with support from Sony France. The Skinny reviewed the album in September 2018.

In 2020, Agar Agar released the EP Nap.

The duo released its second studio album, Player Non Player, in 2023. Loud and Quiet reviewed the album in January 2023 and described Agar Agar as a Parisian synth-pop act. The five-year gap between albums was explained by the duo as being the result of exhaustion after six years of touring and the COVID-19 lockdown.

For Player Non Player, the duo developed a related video-game project with Jonathan Coryn. Institut français presented Player Non Player as a video-game project connected to Agar Agar's album of the same name.

== Style ==
Agar Agar's music was described as electropop by Le Monde and as synth-pop by Loud and Quiet. Reviewing The Dog and the Future, The Skinny described the group as a French duo working with electronic pop.

== Discography ==
=== Studio albums ===
- The Dog and the Future (2018)
- Player Non Player (2023)

=== EPs ===
- Cardan (2016)
- Nap (2020)

== Members ==
- Clara Cappagli – vocals
- Armand Bultheel – synthesizers
