= Janda pulang (drink) =

Malaysian beverage

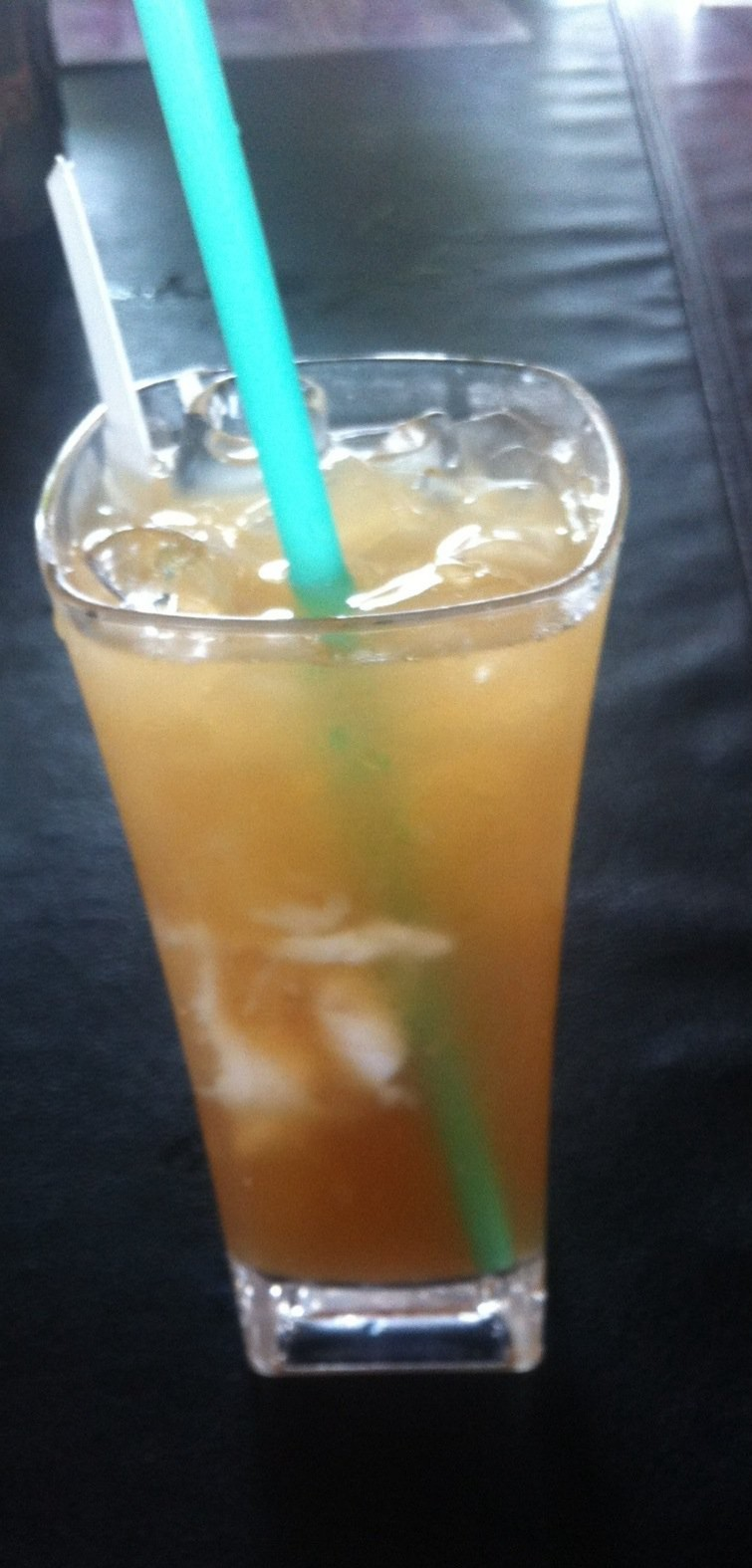
- Alternative names: Jando Pulang
- Type: Drink
- Place of origin: Malaysia
- Region or state: Kuala Pilah, Negeri Sembilan
- Created by: Negeri Sembilan Malays
- Main ingredients: Water, coconut contents, palm sugar

Janda pulang (lit. 'returning widow'; Negeri Sembilan Malay: Aei jando pulang, Jawi: اءير جندا ڤولڠ) is a traditional drink in Kuala Pilah, Negeri Sembilan, Malaysia. It is said to be suitable to drink with lunch and during hot days.
