= Kolo mee =

Dry noodle dish from Sarawak, Malaysia

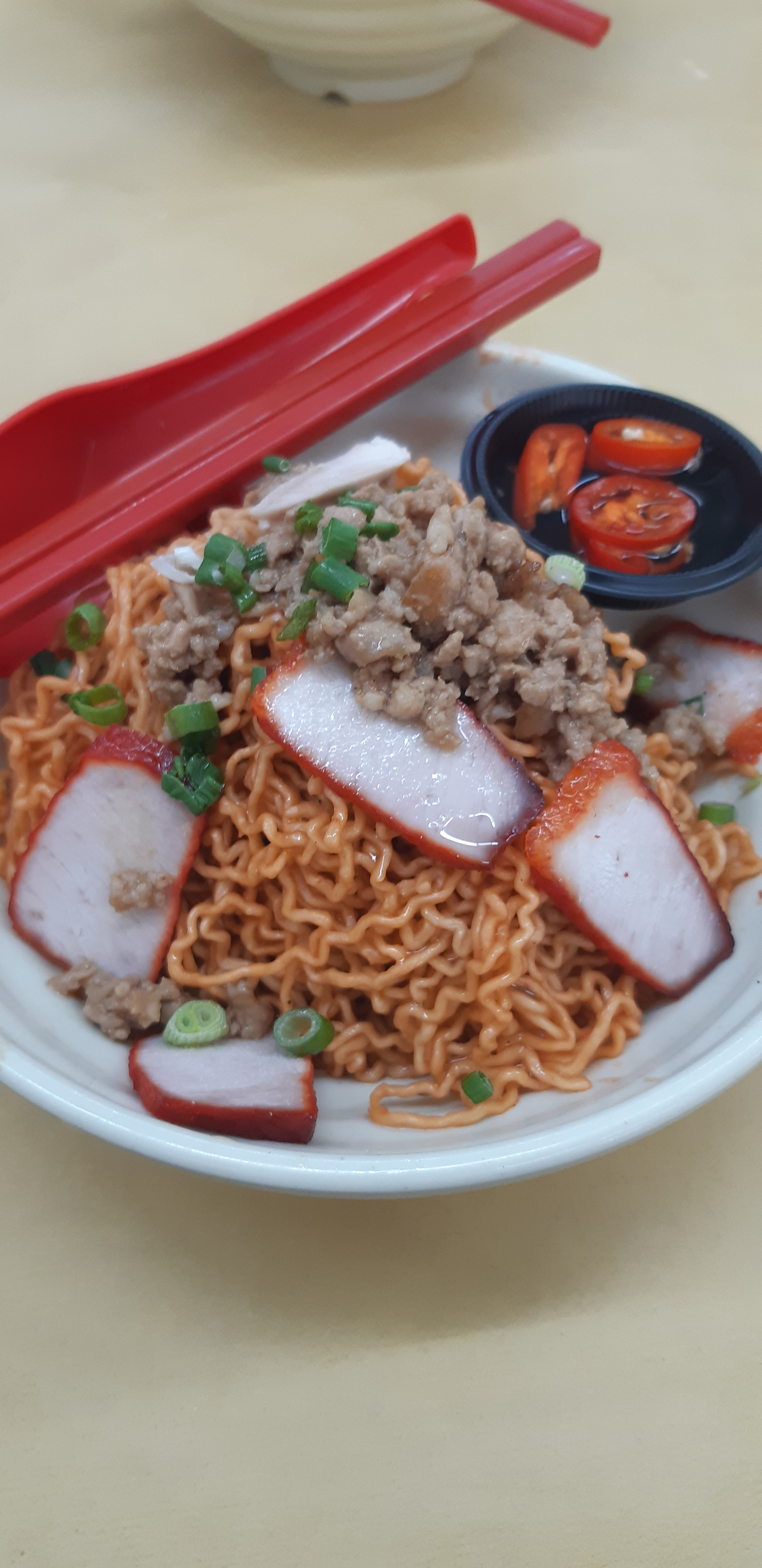
- Sarawak kolo mee with minced pork, sliced char siu, and pickled chillies
- Alternative names: mee kolo; mi kolok; mi kering; mi rangkai
- Type: Noodle dish
- Course: Main course
- Place of origin: Malaysia
- Region or state: Sarawak; Sabah; Brunei
- Created by: Kiew Shao Nyap
- Main ingredients: Egg noodles, shallots, minced pork/chicken/duck, soy sauce, char siu slices
- Food energy (per serving): 489 kcal (2,050 kJ)
- Similar dishes: Sigyet khauk swè; dandanmian

Kolo mee, or mee kolo (Malay: Mi kolok; Iban: Mi kering or mi rangkai; Chinese: 哥羅麵; Jyutping: Go1 Lo4 Min6; Pe̍h-ōe-jī: Ko-lô-mī), is a Sarawakian dish of dry noodles tossed in a savoury pork (or chicken, duck for a halal version) and shallot mixture, topped with fried onions and tossed in a clear sauce. The dish was included in the Declaration of Heritage Objects, a gazette of heritage foods of Malaysia, in 2024.

== Origin and background ==
Kolo mee traces its history to the settlement of the Chinese community in Kuching during the British protectorate era in the 19th century, especially among the Hokkien and Foochow people, where it was served in almost every local Chinese restaurant and street stall. The dish is derived from the Hakka taipoo noodles from Guangdong, which reached the town of Kuching in the 1920s. Developed by a man named Kiew Shao Nyap from his own salted noodle recipe, the dish became popular, and Nyap subsequently had a career selling it from a street stall. The word "kolo" means "dry mix" or "dry tossed" in local Chinese dialects.

Since then, kolo mee has evolved into several variants, including "red" (which includes a char siu marinade); "black" (saltier, with dark soy sauce); and halal, for Muslim consumers (usually paired with chicken, duck, beef, or seafood as a substitute for pork). Another version, from the neighbouring state of Sabah, has a darker appearances, with soy sauce, char siu, and siu yuk (crunchy pork belly), along with choy sum. The dish is also popular in Brunei, where an instant version is also available.

== Preparation and ingredients ==
Kolo mee can be made from either straight, curly, or handmade noodles. The dish is prepared by readying pork fat in a saucepan with water and simmering it for at least 30 minutes, until the fat becomes crispy, at which point it separates from the pork oil. Char siu pork slices are added to the broth and noodles, along with optional vegetables. The dish is topped with spring onions or fried shallots.

== Gallery ==
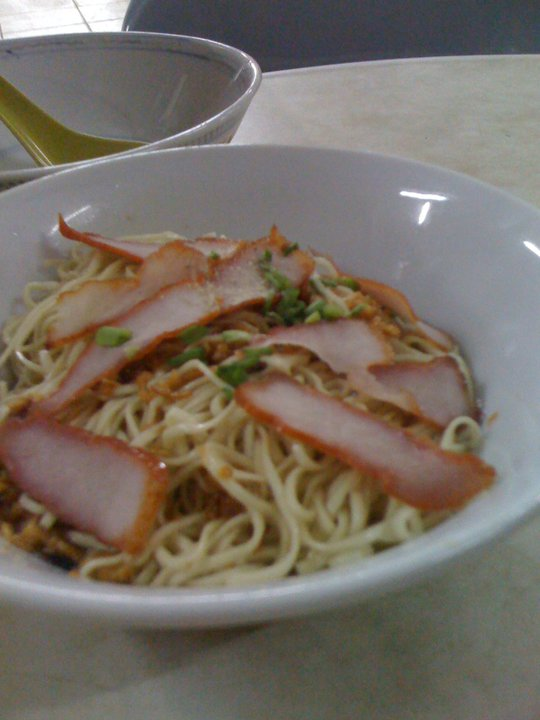
Sarawak kolo mee served in a restaurant in Kuching, Malaysia

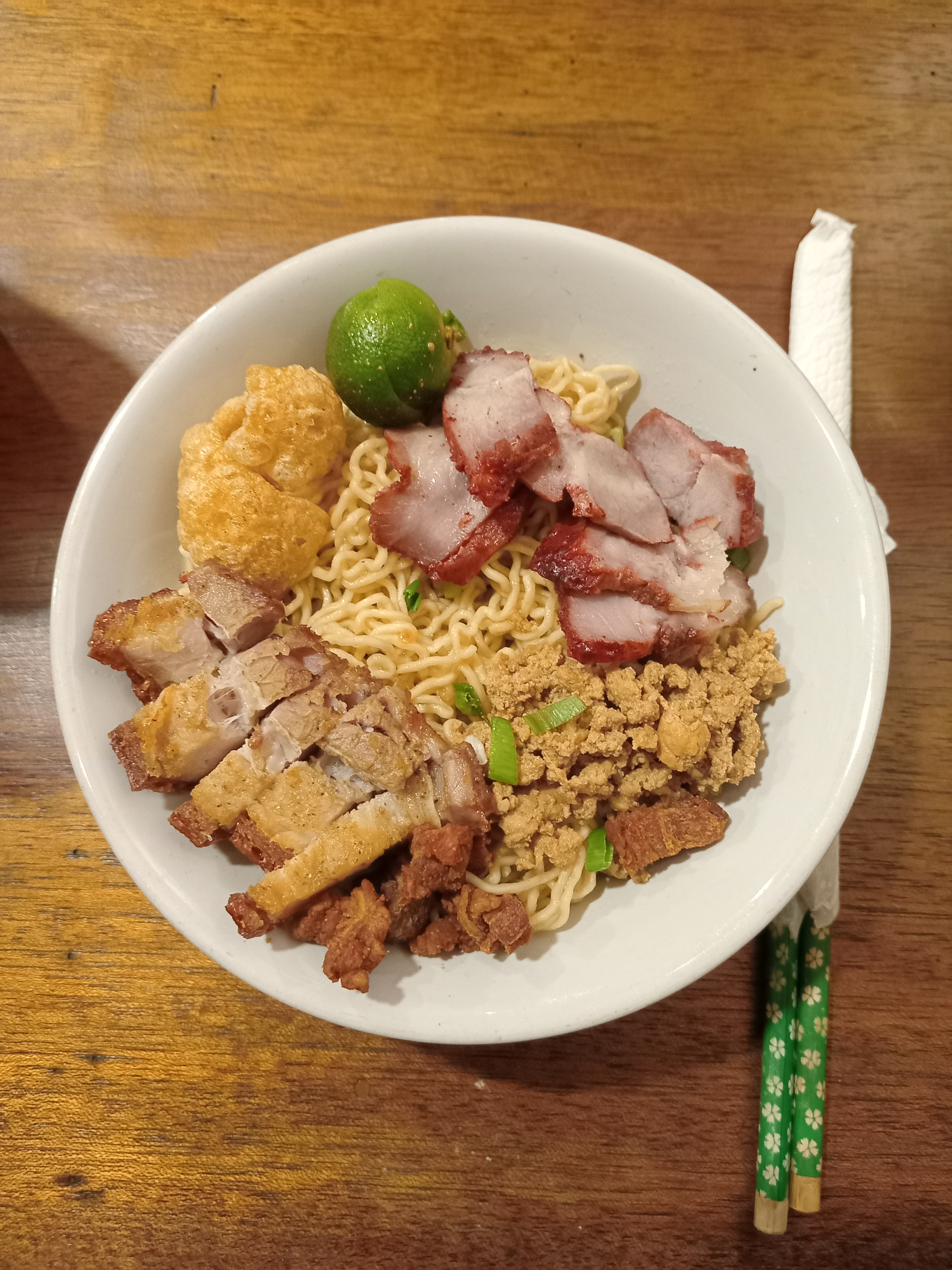
Kolo mee with pork, tofu, and lime, served in a bowl with chopsticks

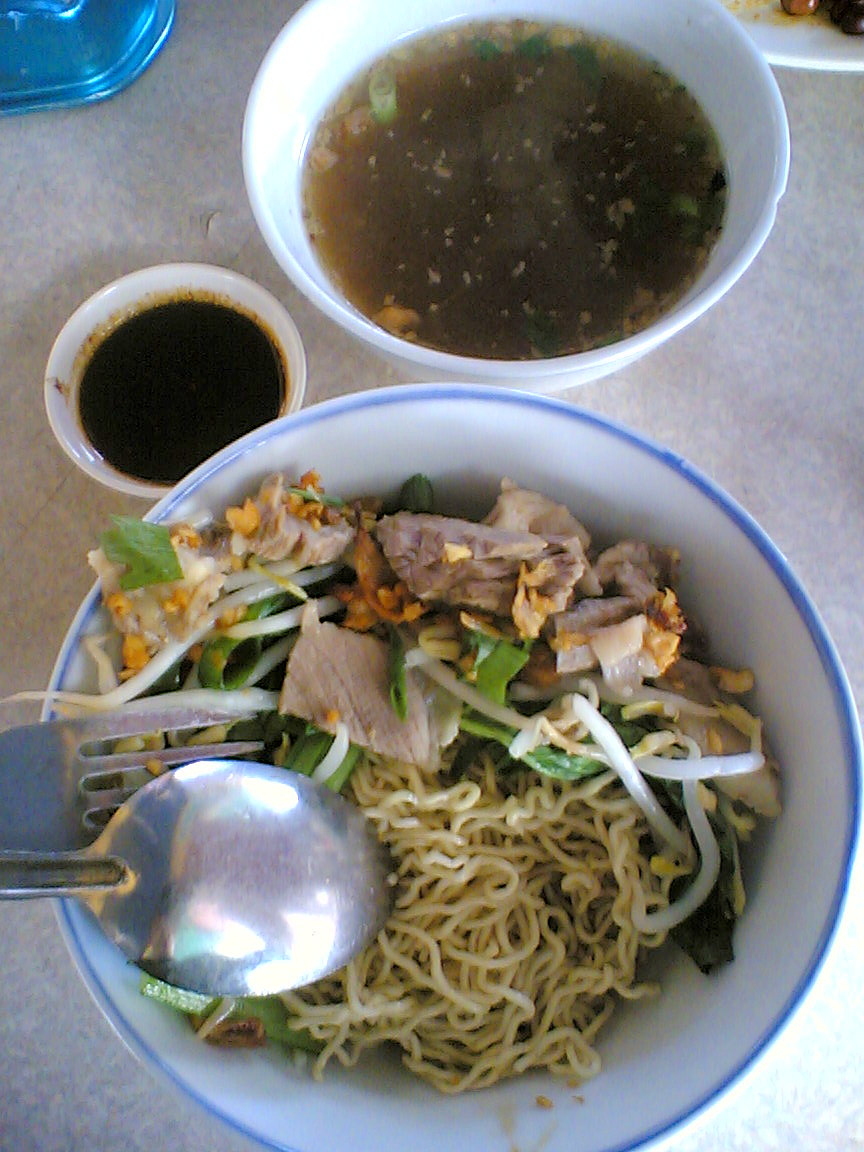
Kolo mee with chicken served with soup and sweet soy sauce

== See also ==
- List of noodle dishes
