= Nuea phat phrik =

Thai pepper steak

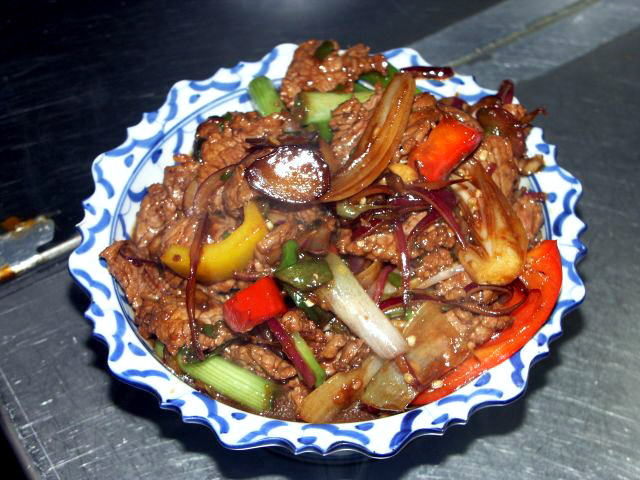
A plate of nuea phat phrik

Nuea phat phrik (Thai: เนื้อผัดพริก; pronounced [nɯ́a̯ pʰàt pʰrík]) is often translated as Thai pepper steak or fried hot and spicy meat. It is a Thai dish of beef fried with chili peppers and herbs. It is a stir-fried dish that includes shallots, garlic, hot chili peppers, bamboo shoots, green onions, mint and basil leaves, soy, fish and oyster sauces, and palm sugar.
