= Ayam pansuh =

Indonesian and Malaysian traditional chicken dish

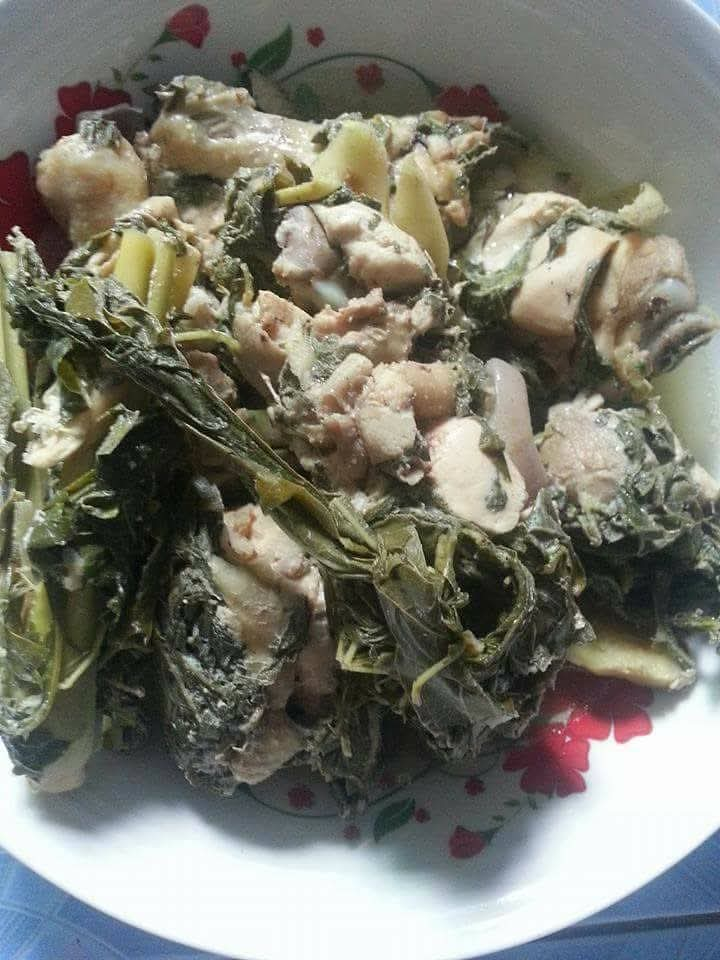
- Freshly cooked ayam pansuh served in a bowl
- Alternative names: Ayam pansoh, manuk pansuh, manok pansoh, or syok tanok darum bu-uruk
- Type: Dish
- Course: Appetiser or side dish
- Place of origin: Indonesia and Malaysia
- Region or state: West Kalimantan and Sarawak
- Created by: Dayaks
- Serving temperature: Hot or warm
- Main ingredients: Chicken, garlic, red onion, lemongrass, galangal, ginger, bungkang (eugenia cephalanthum) or salam (syzygium polyanthum) leaves and red chillies
- Food energy (per serving): 64 kcal (270 kJ)

Ayam pansuh (or also known as manok pansoh) is a traditional dish among the indigenous Dayaks of West Kalimantan, Indonesia and Sarawak, Malaysia, commonly prepared by cooking chicken meat in a bamboo stalk, filled with water (which will later be the soup), seasonings and covered with tapioca leaves from the cassava plant (later can be eaten together with the cooked chicken). It is the most common traditional food often served to guests in Sarawak, especially during the ethnic festive season.

== Origin and background ==
The origin of the ayam pansuh is unknown, but the Ibans and the Bidayuhs from southwestern Borneo always prepare the dish during their community festivals, especially during the Gawai Dayak (a thanksgiving festival marking a bountiful harvest). Among the Ibans, the word of "pansoh" carries the meaning of "food cooked in a bamboo" in their local language. Ayam pansuh is typical among the people in Sarawak, Malaysia and also in West Kalimantan, Indonesia. It is often served as tabas (appetiser or special dish) or as a special side dish throughout their festivals and ceremonies and when welcoming guests.

== Preparation ==
Freshly diced and cleaned chicken meat, usually from the ayam kampong breed, will be marinated with ingredients such as chillies, kantan flowers (etlingera elatior), lemongrass, ginger, turmeric, and galangal leaves. No cooking oil or water will be used, while yam leaves will be squeezed with salt to release their sap and reduce bitterness. All the ingredients are put into the bamboo, while the yam shoots or tapioca leaves are used to cover the mouth of the bamboo before being cooked over a wood fire. The bamboo needs to be constantly rotated to prevent it from burning and to ensure that the chicken is evenly cooked. It takes around 30 minutes to an hour to cook completely depending on the thickness of the bamboo used and is ready to be served when the stalks of the yam sprouts had turn brown.

== See also ==
- List of stuffed dishes
