= Hainan Chicken House =

Malaysian restaurant in New York City

- Interactive map of Hainan Chicken House

Restaurant information
- Food type: Malaysian
- Location: 4807 Eighth Avenue, Brooklyn, New York, 11220, United States
- Coordinates: 40°38′31″N 74°00′10″W
- Website: hainanchickenhouse.com

Hainan Chicken House is a Malaysian restaurant in New York City.

== History ==
The restaurant opened in February 2023.

== Reception ==
The New York Times included Hainan Chicken House in a list of the city's 12 best new restaurants.
