= Akok (food) =

Traditional Malaysian snack

Akok اكوق
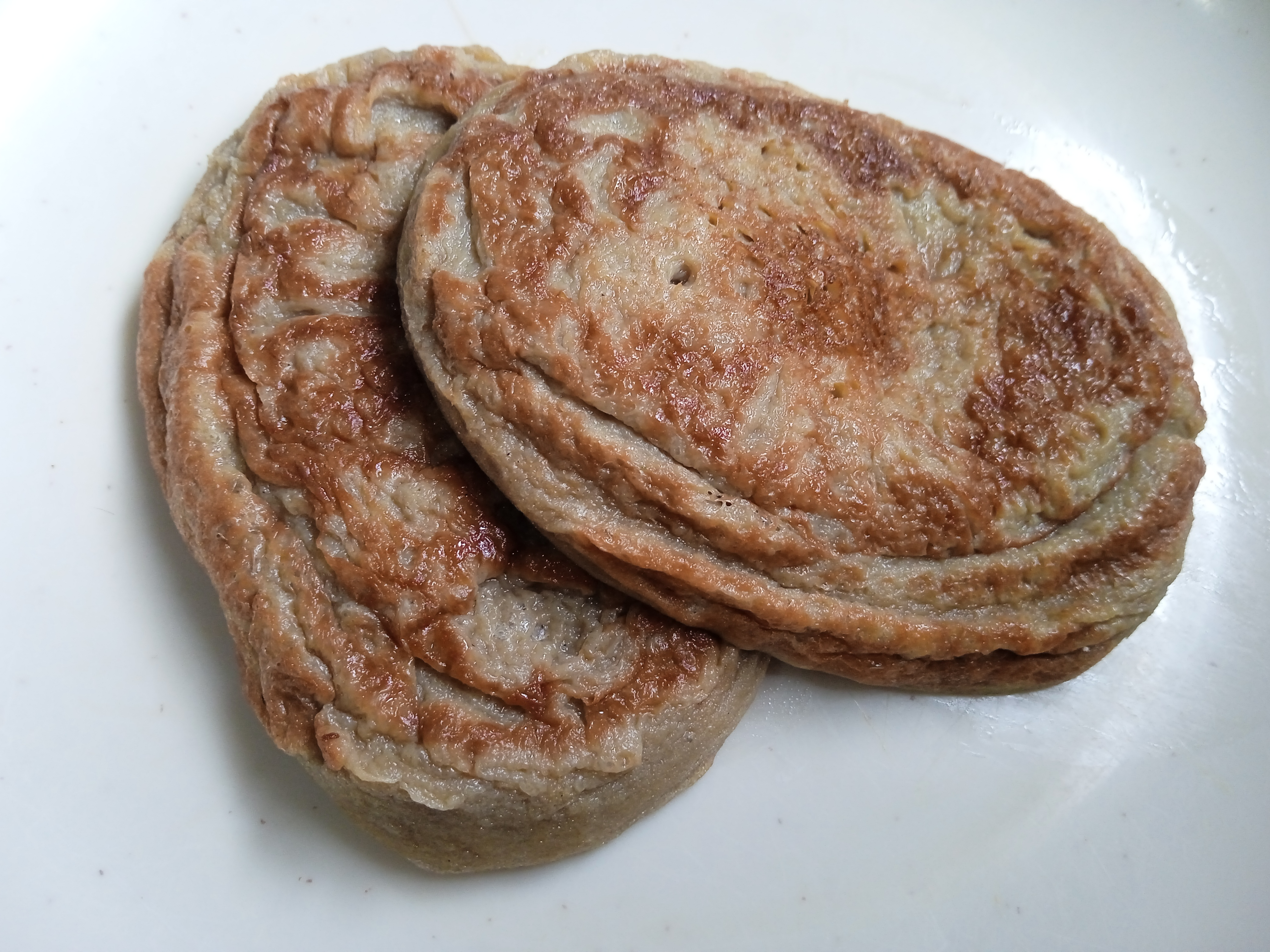
- Type: Kuih
- Course: Snack or dessert
- Place of origin: Malaysia
- Region or state: Kelantan and Terengganu
- Created by: Malays
- Main ingredients: Wheat flour, eggs, sugar, coconut milk and pandan leaves

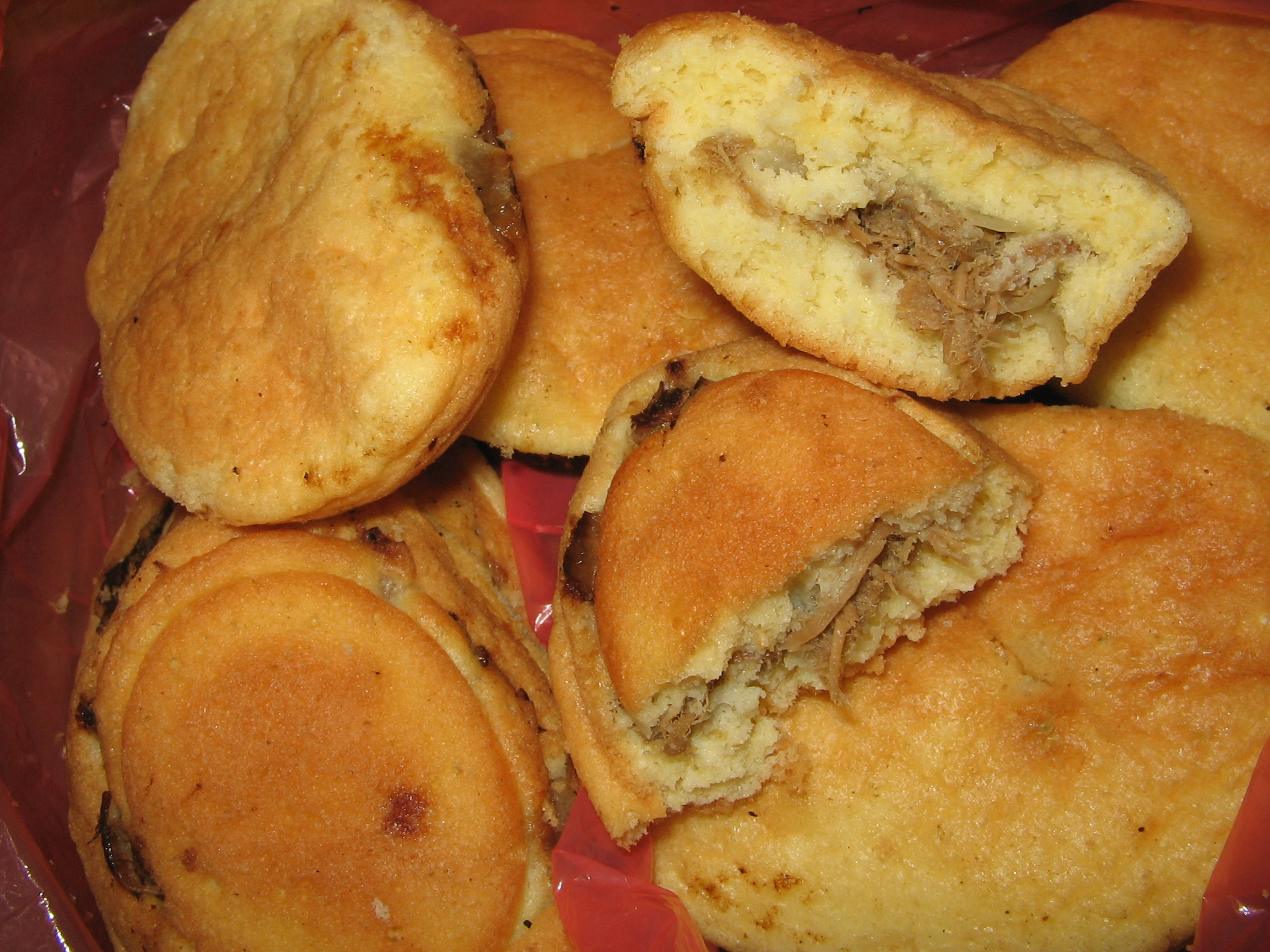
Akok berlauk, a savoury variant.

Akok (Jawi: اكوق) is one of the famous traditional foods in the east coast of Peninsular Malaysia, notably the states of Kelantan and Terengganu. The kuih is can be consumed as a snack or as a dessert. It is made with flour, sugar, eggs, and coconut milk.

Akok has two main variants. The former consists of the ingredients aforementioned, and is normally can be seen in Terengganu. While the latter incorporates brown sugar or palm sugar into the batter mixture, which gives it a darker colouration. This variant is ubiquitous in Kelantan and appear to be less fluffy compared to the former.

Akok in general is sweet and has a rich, eggy aftertaste. However, there is a savoury variant known as akok berlauk, which include a filling made of minced meat, curry powder, chili peppers and fried onions.

Akok is traditionally baked in a brass mould heated with smouldering coconut charcoal, in a similar manner as the bahulu. The coconut charcoal gives it a characteristic smoky flavour and aroma.

== See also ==
- Cuisine of Malaysia
- Bahulu
- Æbleskiver - A similarly-fried Danish confectionery served with jam or powdered sugar.
- Khanom krok, a Thai dish
- Mont lin maya, a Burmese dish
- Neyyappam, a fermented South Indian sweet dumpling fried in Ghee
- Paddu, a fermented South Indian dumpling that can be made spicy with chillies or sweet with jaggery.
- Pinyaram, an Indonesian dish
- Poffertjes, a Dutch sweet dish
- Unni appam, a fermented South Indian sweet dumpling made with fruits like Jackfruit or Banana
