= Kue cucur =

Indonesian traditional snack

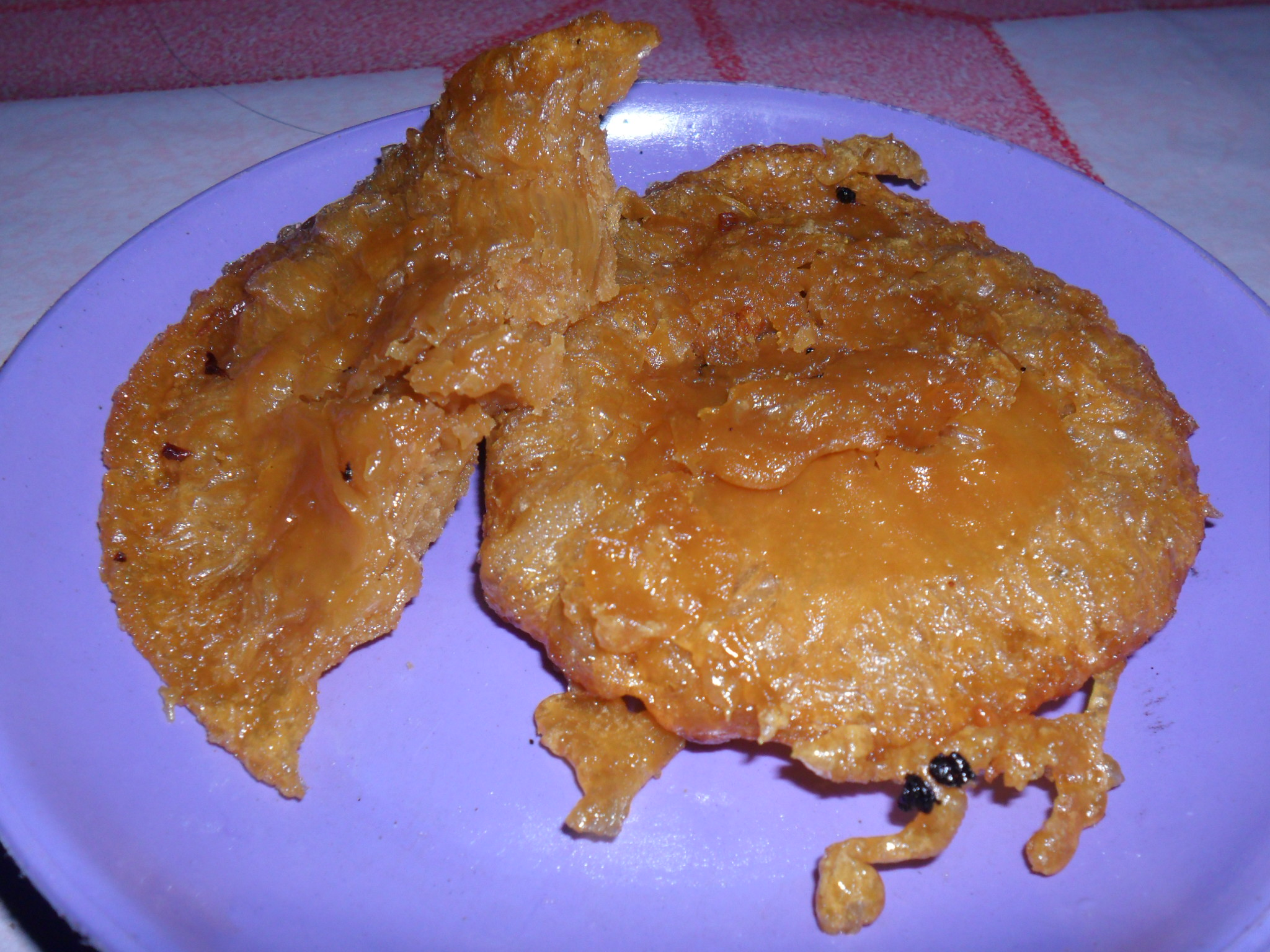
- Kue cucur made with brown palm sugar
- Alternative names: Kuih cucur (Malaysia), khanom fak bua or khanom chuchun (Thailand)
- Course: Dessert
- Place of origin: Indonesia
- Region or state: Jakarta and Nationwide in Indonesia, also popular in Malaysia, Thailand and Singapore
- Serving temperature: hot, warm, or room temperature
- Main ingredients: Rice flour, sugar, coconut milk

Kue cucur (Indonesian) or kuih cucur (Malay), known in Thai as khanom fak bua (ขนมฝักบัว, pronounced [kʰā.nǒm fàk būa̯]) or khanom chuchun (ขนมจู้จุน or จูจุ่น), is a traditional snack from Indonesia, and popular in parts of Southeast Asia, includes Indonesia, Malaysia, southern Thailand and Singapore. In Indonesia, kue cucur can be found throughout traditional marketplaces in the country; the popular version, however, is the Betawi version from Jakarta. In Brunei and Malaysia, the term cucur is generally used to refer to any type of fritters. A popular type of cucur in Brunei and Malaysia is Jemput-jemput (also known as Cokodok) and Pinjaram (also known as Kuih cucur gula merah/melaka). In Southern Thailand, it is often featured in wedding ceremonies and festivals.

The dessert, made of fried rice flour mixed with palm sugar, is thick in the middle and thin at the edges. It is eaten immediately after it is fried, while it is still soft.

== See also ==
- Jemput-jemput
- Kue
- Kue pinyaram
- Khanom krok
- Mont lin maya
- Neyyappam
- Paddu
- Pinjaram
- Serabi
- Unni appam
