= Pinjaram =

Traditional snack of Bajau, Brunei Malay people, Iranun and Melanau people

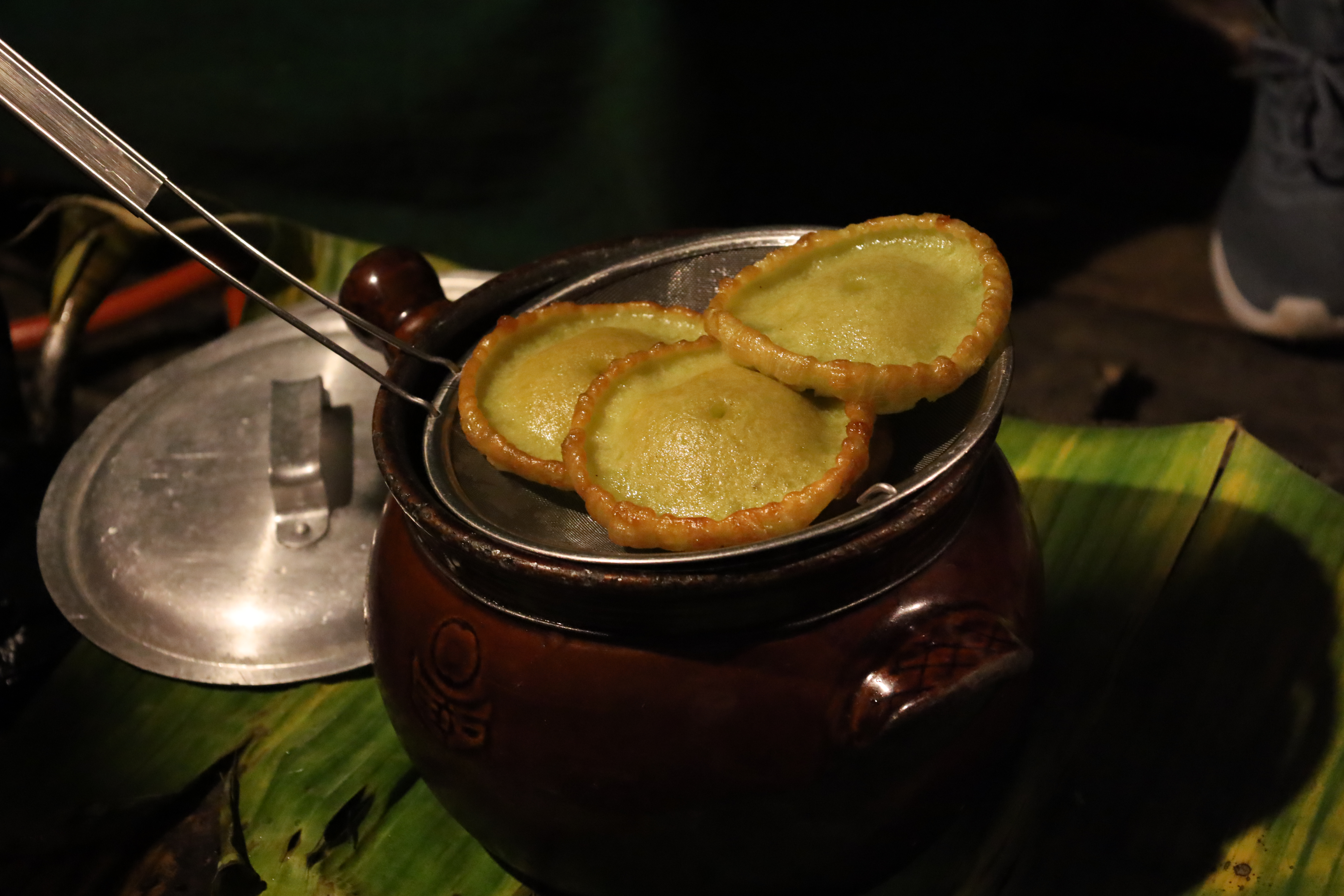
- A pinjaram served at the Mari Mari Cultural Village of Sabah
- Alternative names: Penjaram/penyaram (in certain dialects), kuih amik, kuih UFO, sinisiung, kuih telinga tikus, penganan iri, kuih cucur jawa
- Type: Snack (kuih dessert)
- Place of origin: Brunei, Malaysia
- Region or state: Sabah, Sarawak, Kedah
- Created by: Bajau, Bruneian Malay, Iban, Iranun, Kadazan-Dusun, and Melanau
- Main ingredients: Rice flour, corn flour, coconut milk, sugar, cooking oil

Pinjaram, also known as penjaram, penyaram, sinisiung, kuih amik, kuih UFO, kuih telinga tikus, penganan iri or kuih cucur jawa is a traditional kuih for the Bajau/Iranun, Bruneian Malay people in Brunei and those in the West Coast Division together with the Kadazan-Dusun of Sabah, as well as for the Melanau in the Mukah Division and Iban in the Sri Aman Division of Sarawak and northern Malay people in Kedah of Malaysia.

Pinjaram is made of rice flour, corn flour, coconut milk, sugar, and cooking oil, with some creators use pandan-flavoured sugar instead of the normal sugar to produce a more tantalising aroma. In Sabah, there is three flavours and colours of pinjaram: the original-flavoured (yellow), pandan-flavoured (green) and brown sugar-flavoured (dark brown). A chocolate variant of pinjaram is also available. It is usually served during tea-time or for religious or cultural celebrations and can be found sold at most tamu (weekly market) in the region. In Sarawak, the penyaram made by Melanau community use a type of Sarawak palm sugar called apong sugar (gula apong).

In neighbouring Indonesia, there is an identical kue called pinyaram found in street stalls and warung in the country although its size is smaller than the most pinjaram in Malaysia. A similar snack is also available and is very commonly found within the Mekong Delta (Western Region) of Vietnam, where it is known by the local name of bánh tai yến (crispy bird's nest cake).

Despite pinjaram being referred to by the northern Malay people of Kedah in West Malaysia as kuih cucur jawa, the origin of the name has nothing to do with Javanese or Indonesian people, just as the drink bandung, and bandung noodles (mee bandung) did not originate in the Indonesian city of Bandung, and Filipino Java rice is also not from Java.

== See also ==
- Æbleskiver, a similarly-fried Danish confectionery served with jam or powdered sugar
- Hinompuka, a Kadazan-Dusun rice cake
- Khanom krok, a Thai dish
- Mont lin maya, a Burmese dish
- Neyyappam, a fermented South Indian sweet dumpling fried in Ghee
- Paddu, a fermented South Indian dumpling that can be made spicy with chillies or sweet with jaggery
- Pinyaram, an Indonesian dish
- Poffertjes, a Dutch sweet dish
- Takoyaki, a Japanese dish
- Unni appam, a fermented South Indian sweet dumpling made with fruits like Jackfruit or Banana
