= Poffertjes =

Traditional Dutch batter treat

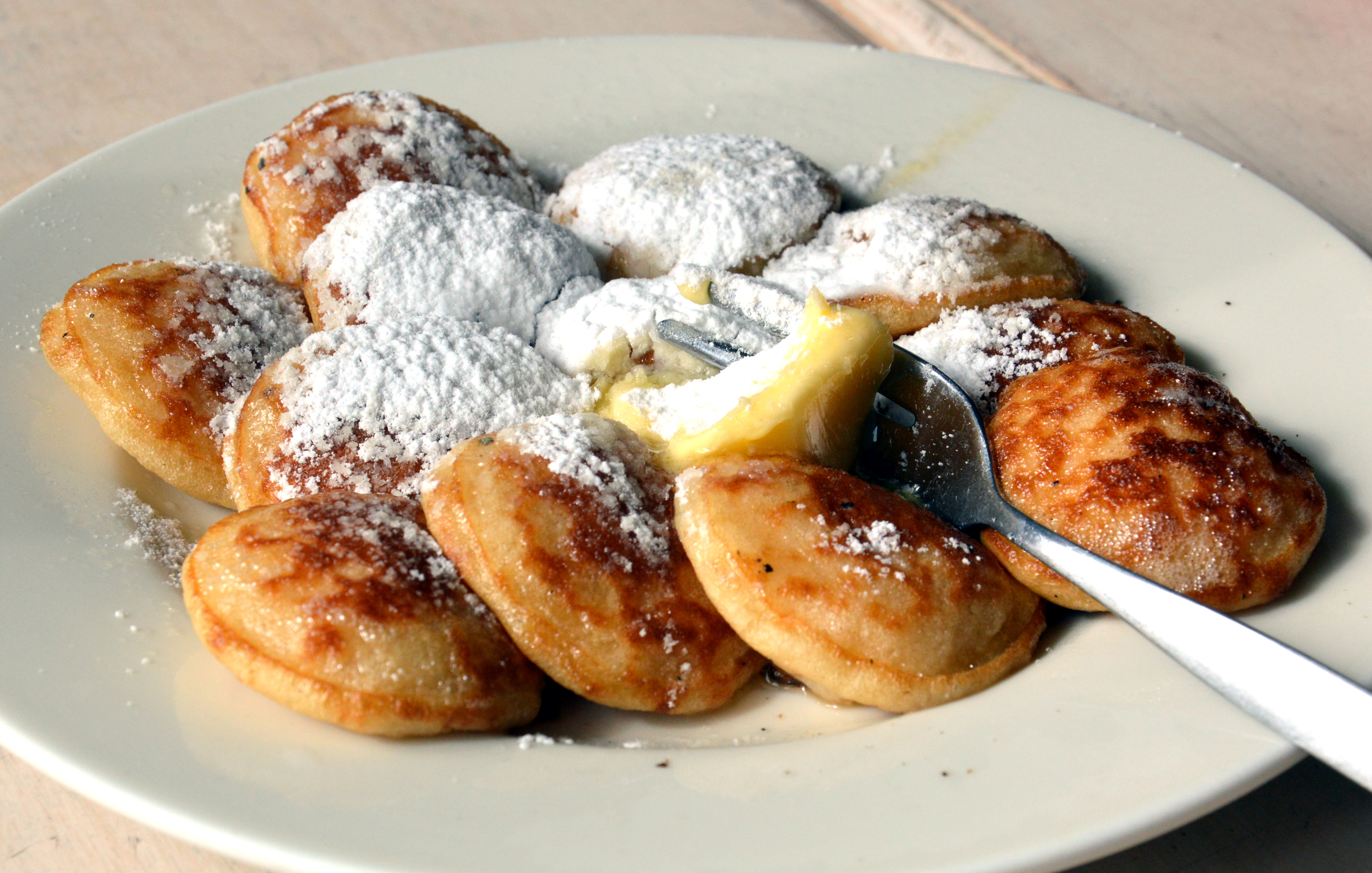
- Poffertjes served with butter and powdered sugar
- Type: Pancake-like
- Course: Dinner, snack, dessert
- Place of origin: Netherlands
- Region or state: Northwestern Europe
- Serving temperature: Warm or hot
- Main ingredients: Batter (yeast, flour)

Poffertjes (Dutch pronunciation: [ˈpɔfərtɕəs]) are traditional Dutch batter cakes. Resembling small, fluffy pancakes, they are made with yeast and flour. Typically, poffertjes are sweet treats served with powdered sugar and butter, and sometimes syrup or advocaat. A savoury variant with gouda cheese is also made.

== History ==
The first mention of poffertjes is credited to a 1746 appendix to the cookbook Volmaakte Hollandsche keuken-meid.

Poffertjes were first seen at a fair in Amsterdam in 1746. They are also known as 'brothers'. The Catholic Church claims they invented them, but there are doubts about that claim.

== Serving ==
Poffertjes are a festive holiday treat in the Netherlands, popular at both summer festivals and Christmas markets. Mainly in the winter season, temporary stands selling poffertjes are quite popular and sell portions containing one or two dozen. Usually the cook prepares them fresh for the customer. They are sold on a small cardboard (sometimes plastic) plate and come with a small disposable fork the size of a pastry fork. Poffertjes are not difficult to prepare, but a special cast iron pan or copper pan (also available in aluminium with Teflon coating) with several shallow indentations in the bottom is required.

Almost all Dutch supermarkets (like Albert Heijn, Lidl and Jumbo) sell ready-made poffertjes that only need to be microwaved, and are sold complete with a sachet of powdered sugar and a small serving of butter. Supermarkets also stock mixes for poffertjes, to which only eggs and milk need to be added. Usually they contain a leavening agent such as baking powder.

Poffertjes can also be served with other sweet garnishes, such as syrup, whipped cream or strawberries, for added flavour.

Poffertjes are also known in Indonesian cuisine through its historical ties as the former Dutch colony as kue cubit (pinched cake).

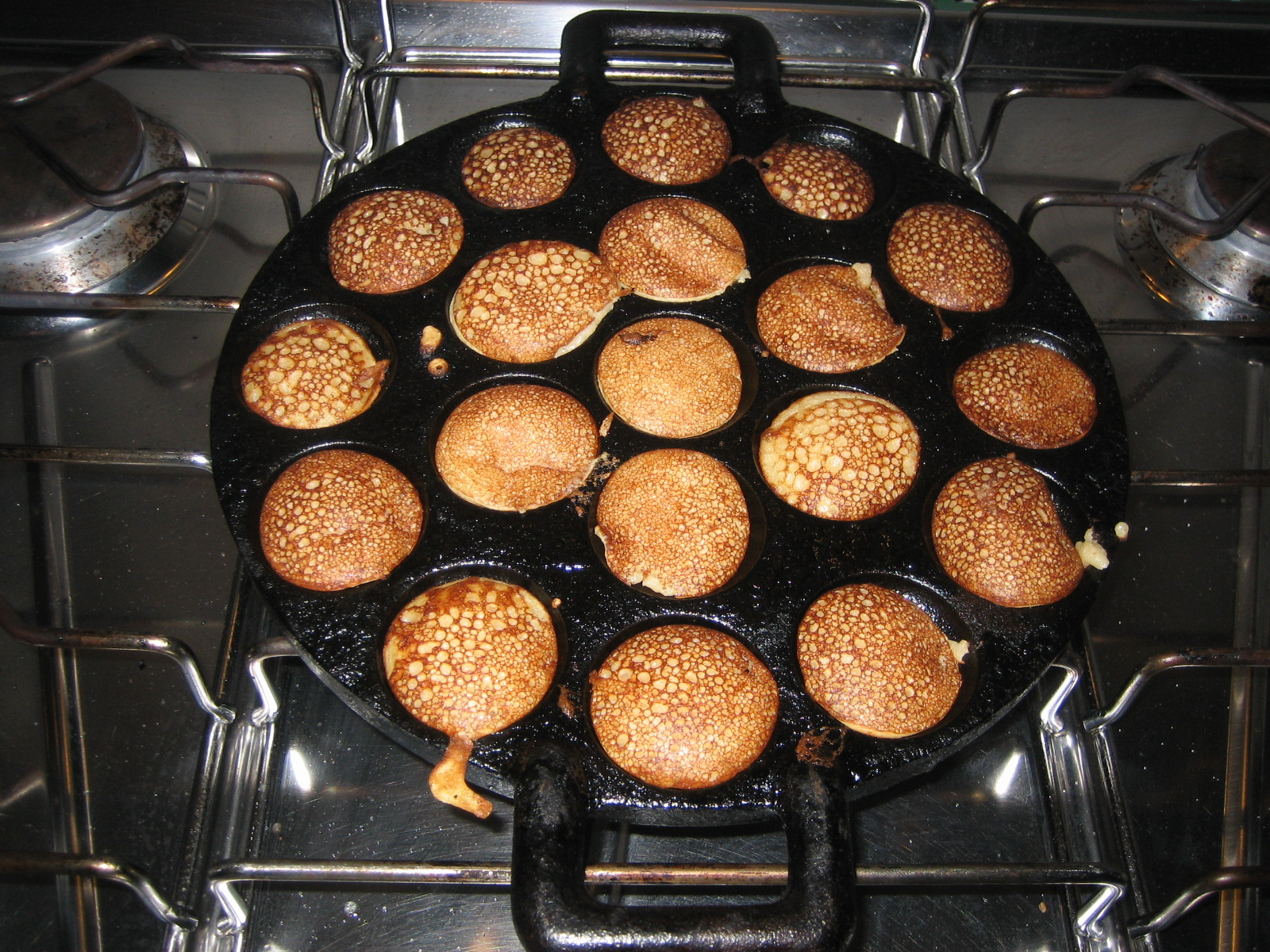
The special poffertjespan

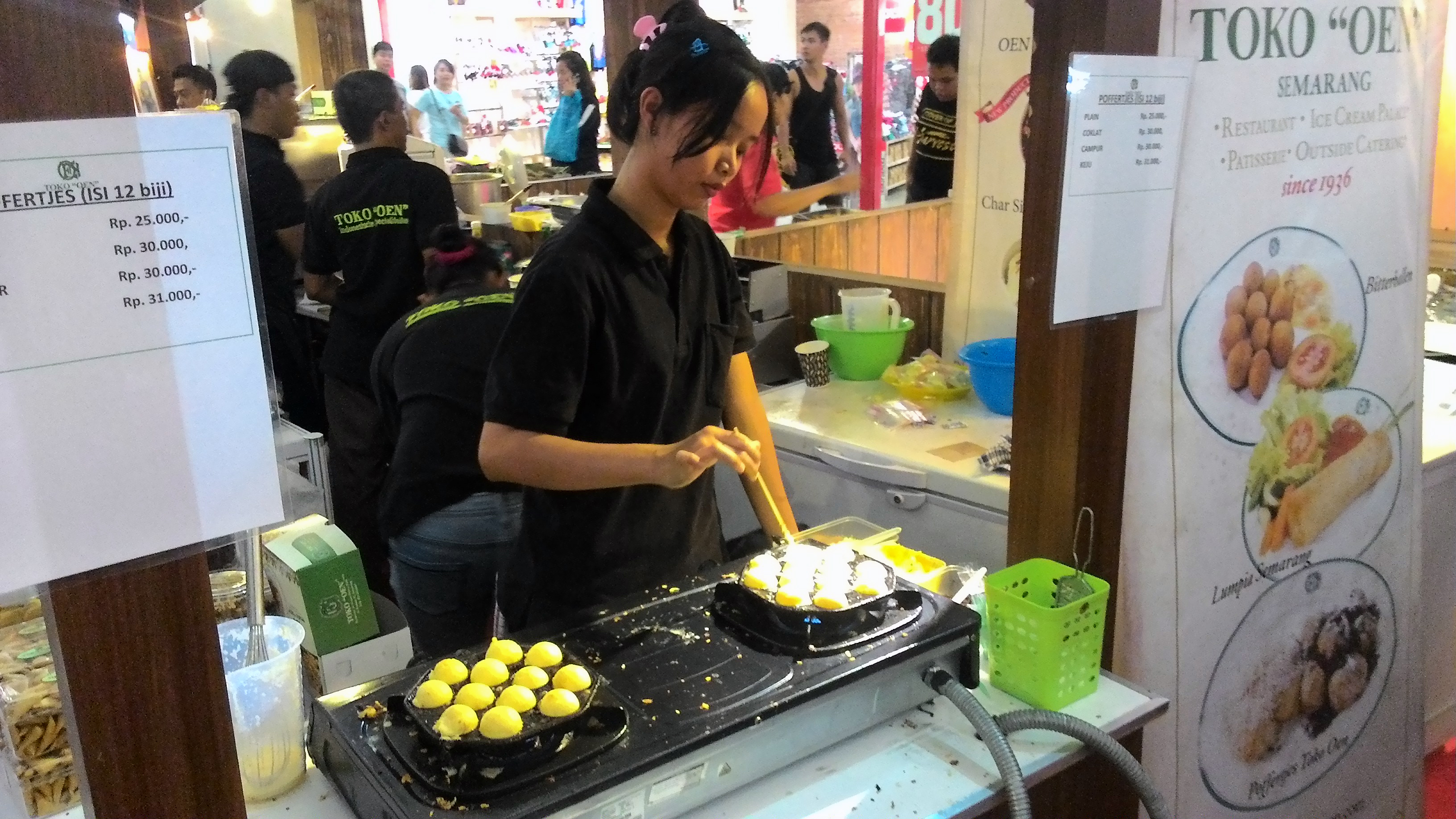
Poffertjes preparation in Semarang

== Similar dishes ==
Poffertjes are thought to be related to and to have influenced the Indonesian kue cubit. Poffertjes have some similarities with Indian paniyaram and Hong Kong egg waffles, but differ in many aspects. The Danish æbleskiver pancakes are quite similar.

== See also ==
- Æbleskiver - A similarly-fried Danish confectionery served with jam or powdered sugar.
- Akok - Malaysian snack or dessert
- Egg waffle - Hong Kong dish
- Khanom krok - Thai dish
- Mont lin maya - Burmese street food dish
- Neyyappam - South Indian sweet fritter fried in ghee
- Paddu - Indian sweet or spicy dish
- Pinjaram - Malaysian kuih
- Pinyaram - Indonesian dish
- Serabi - similar dish utilizing coconuts found in Indonesia
- Suzuyaki - Japanese sweet made from rice flour and sugar
- Takoyaki - similar savory Japanese dish filled with diced octopus
- Unni appam - Indian fried rice cake made with fruit
- List of pancakes
