= Thai pancake =

Thai pancake may refer to several dishes from Thailand:

- Khanom bueang
- Khanom krok
- Kuih cucur
- Roti
