= Appam =

Fermented rice pancake from South India and Sri Lanka

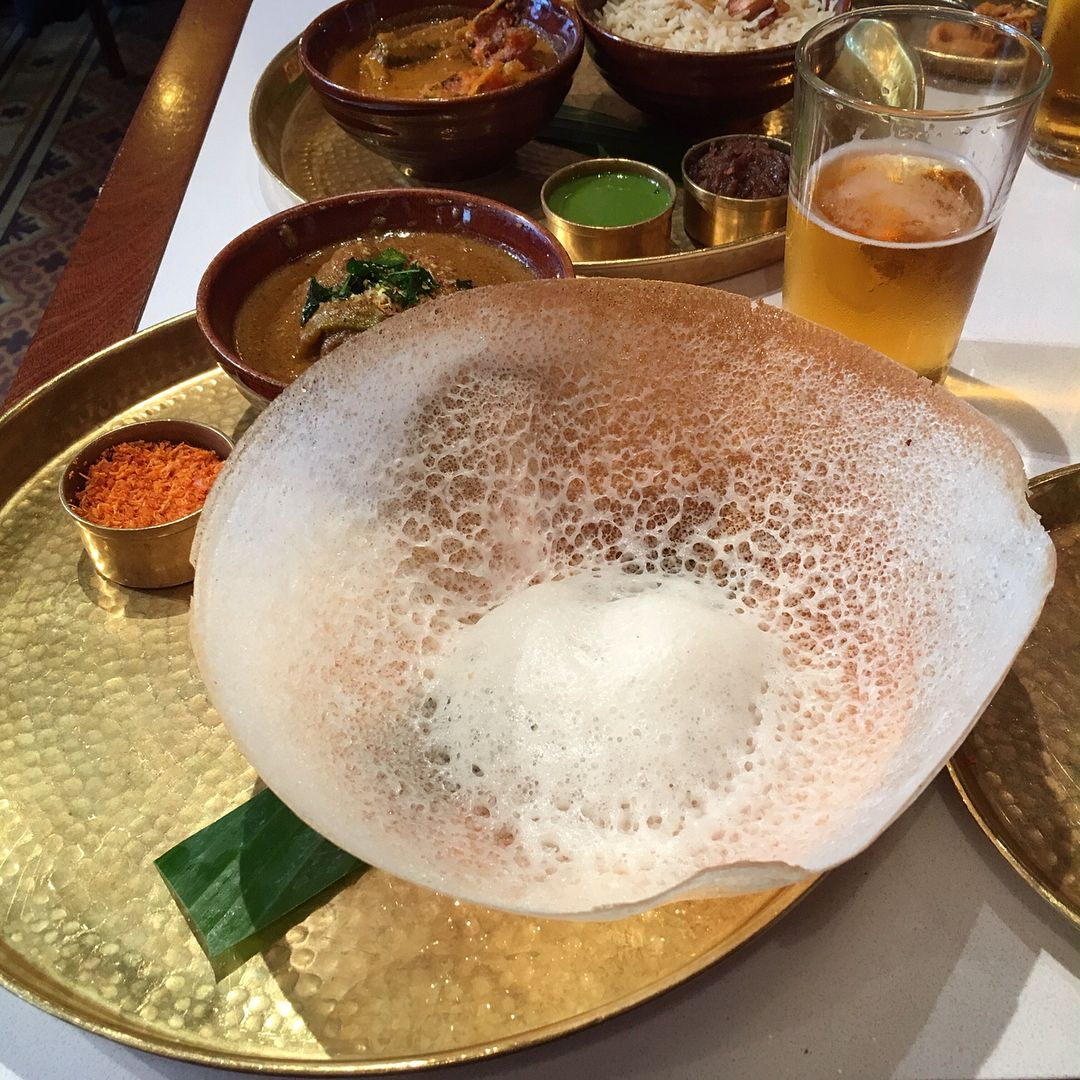
- Appam
- Alternative names: Hoppers, ãppa, kallappam, vellappam, palappam
- Type: Pancake or griddle cake
- Course: Breakfast or dinner
- Associated cuisine: India, Sri Lanka, Southeast Asia
- Main ingredients: Rice batter
- Variations: Egg hoppers

An appam or aappam is a type of thin pancake in South Indian cuisine. It is made with fermented rice batter and coconut milk, traditionally cooked in an appachatti, a deep pan similar in shape to a wok. It is a popular dish in the Indian state of Kerala as well as Sri Lanka. In Sri Lanka, they are typically known as hoppers. Appams are most frequently served for breakfast or dinner, often with a side dish such as a vegetable or egg curry.

== Etymology ==
"Appam" (also aapa, appe) may derive from the Sanskrit word (अपूप apupa), which refers to a type of "fried dainty."

== History ==
Video of making an appam

Vir Sanghvi, an Indian journalist, quotes food historian K. T. Achaya and states that the appam is mentioned in the Tamil Sangam literature, in works like Perumpāṇāṟṟuppaṭai. Achaya states that appams were well-established in ancient Tamil country as mentioned in Sangam, with poems also describing appams along with modakam being sold at street markets in the ancient city of Madurai.

“At nightfall, the sounds of conch shells cease, and shops are shut, their screens pulled down. Vendors, who sell delicate appams that are like honeycombs and modakam that are made by hand, filled with coconut and sugar, sweet and pulses, go to sleep."

Appams are a close relative of dosas. Early dosas were made from rice batter, and later, black lentils were introduced, and since then, black lentils have become an integral component of dosa. The recipe of appam, unlike dosa, has remained unchanged for centuries. One of the earliest recipes for appams can be found in the elaborately carved recipe on the walls of the Srirangam temple, made to be offered to the deity.

At the end of the 18th century, the Carmelite friar Paolino da San Bartolomeo reported that the ancient Saint Thomas Christians of Kerala celebrated the agape lovefeast using a rice-cake dish called "appam".

Appams have a rich history in the island nation of Sri Lanka. There are multiple styles of fermenting appam, and some Jewish historians have noted that the Cochin Jews of Kerala used fresh toddy instead of yeast.

== Variations ==
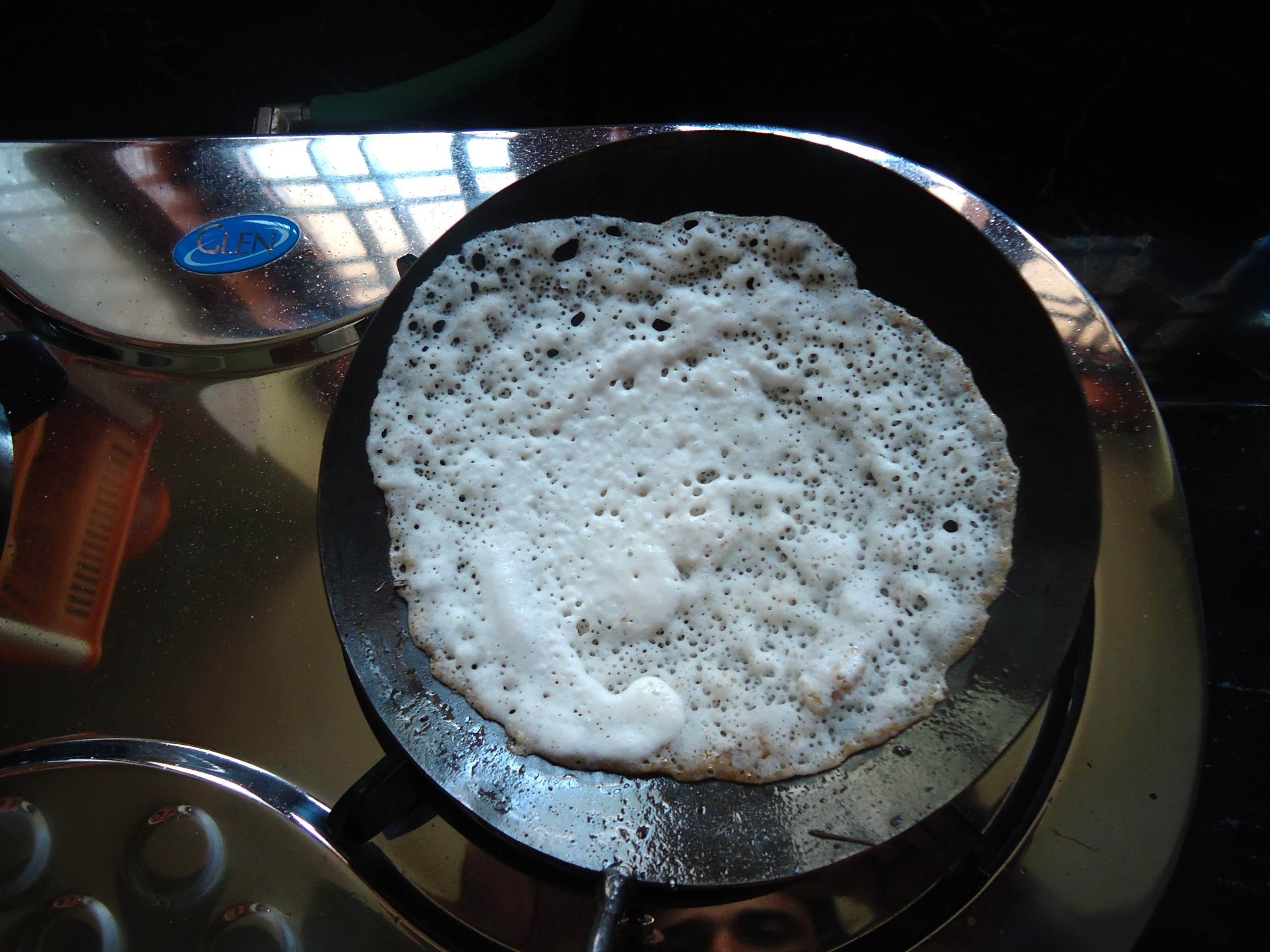
An appam being cooked

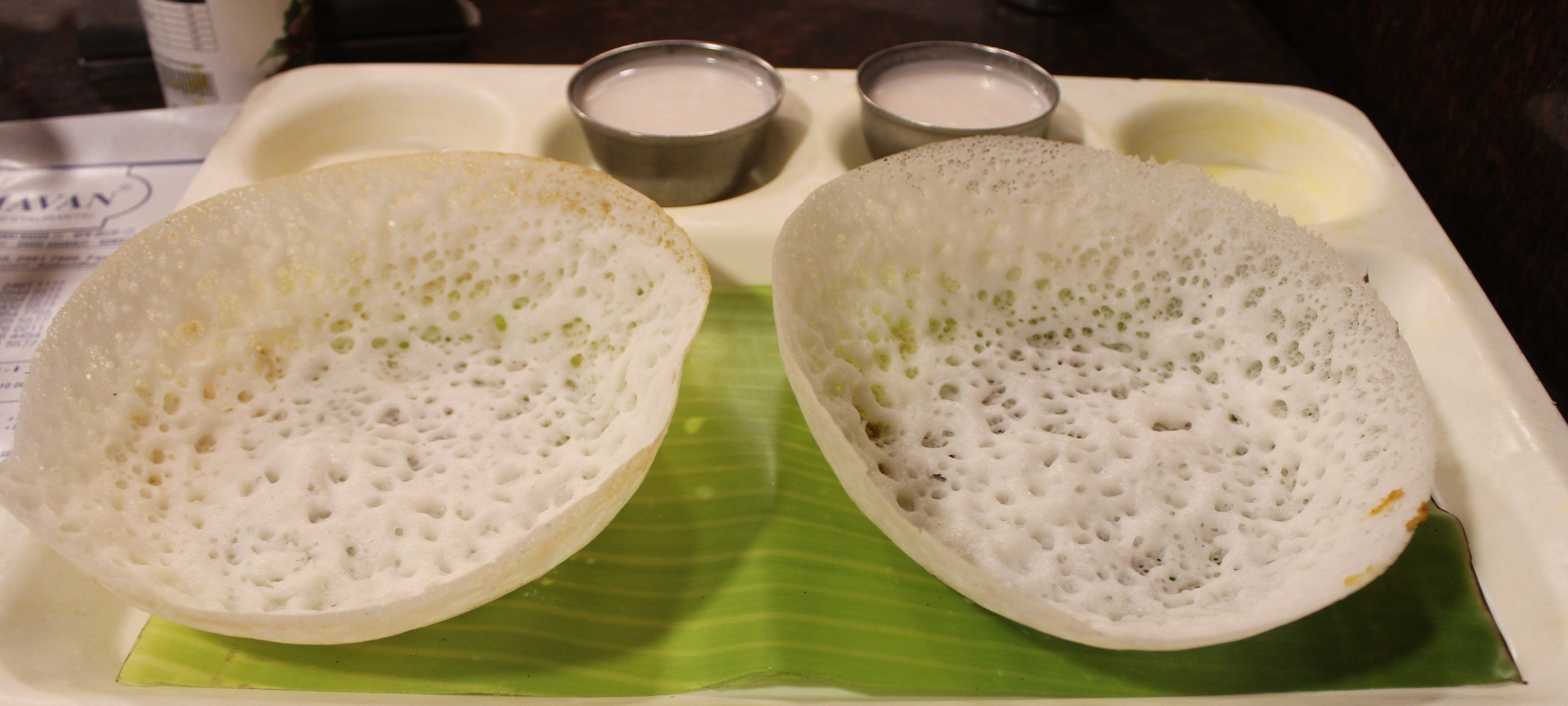
Appam served with coconut milk in Tamil Nadu

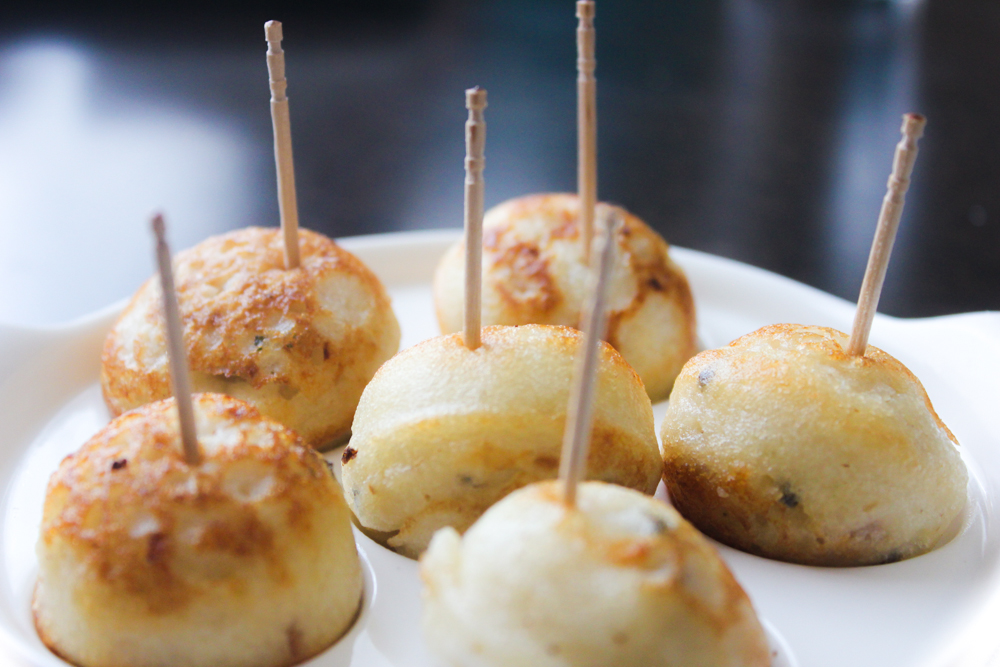
Guli appam

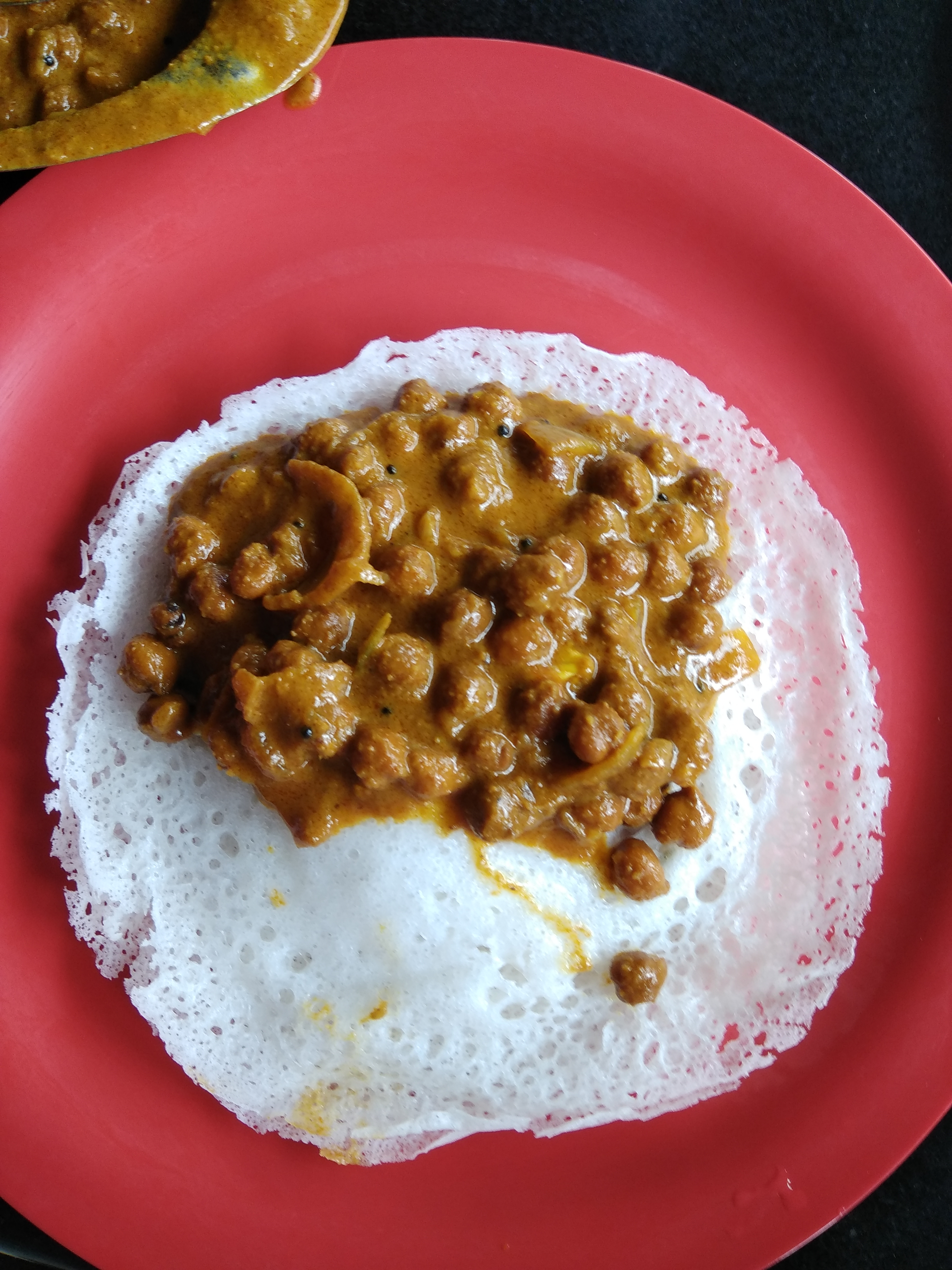
Appam served with chickpea curry from Kerala

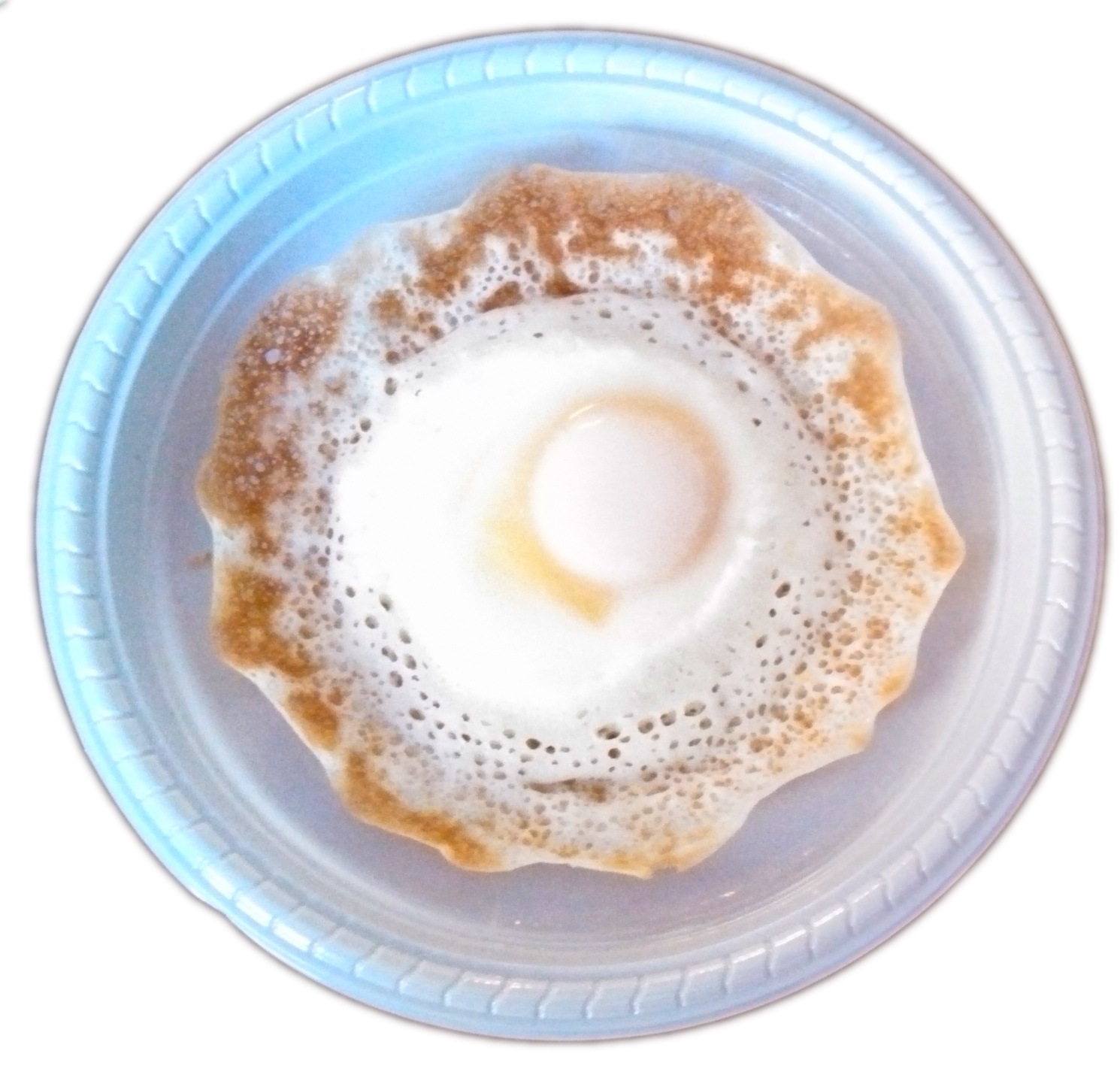
With egg cooked in middle

=== Idiyappam ===
Idiyappams (string hopper or noolputtu) are made from rice noodles curled into flat spirals. They are served for breakfast with a thin curry of fish or chicken, containing only one or two pieces of meat, a dhal (lentil) dish, and a spicy sambol or fresh chutney. Kiri hodi or sodhi, a type of coconut milk curry, is another popular accompaniment to idiyappam. String hoppers are made from steamed rice flour made into a dough with water and a little salt, and forced through a mould similar to those used for pasta to make the strings. They are cooked by steaming. Some people even sprinkle grated coconut on the rice noodles. These hoppers can be bought ready-made. In India and Sri Lanka, string hoppers can be served as both a breakfast meal and as dinner. There are many variations to hoppers, depending on, for example, the type of flour used. This simple dish can be adapted into other foods, such as string hopper biriyani, by adding scrambled eggs or vegetables.

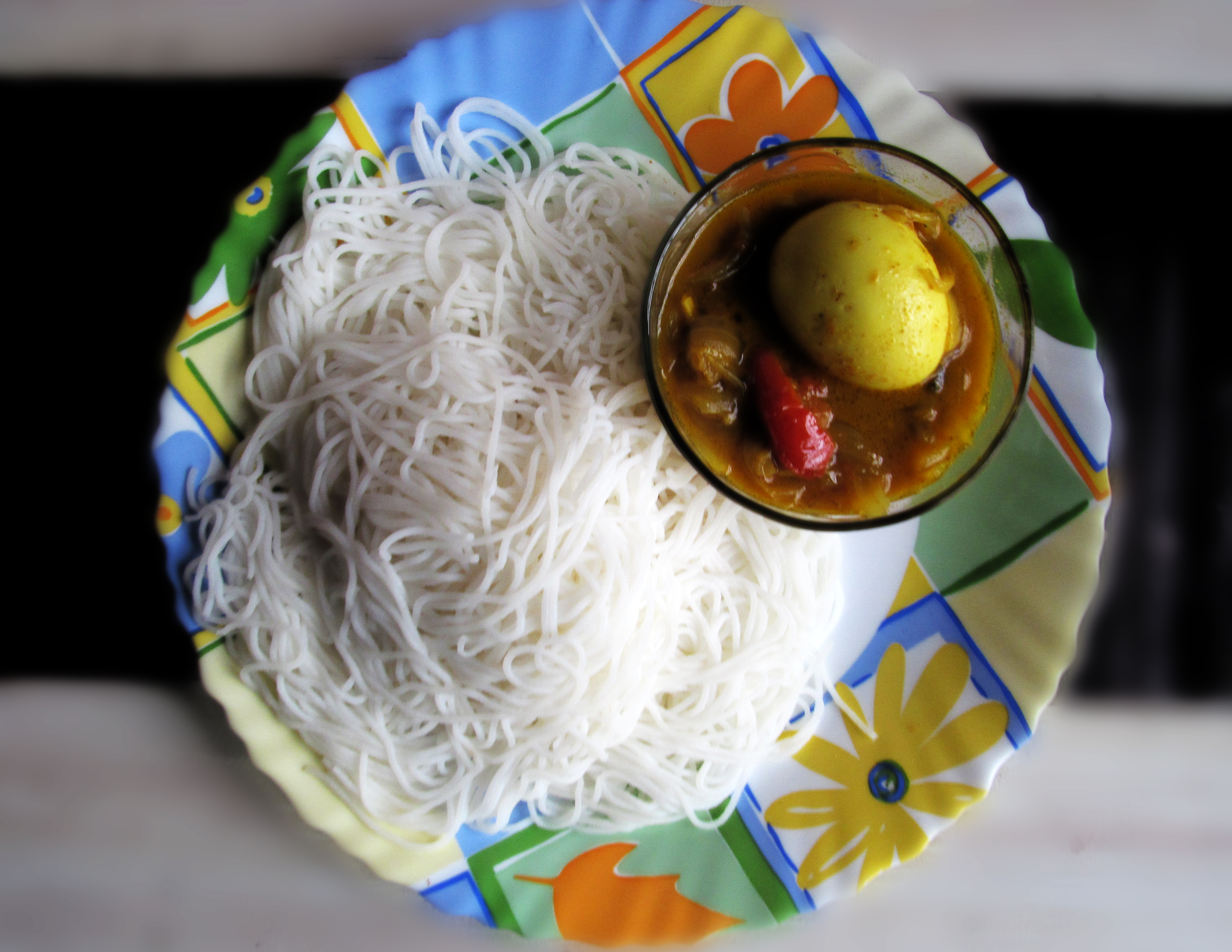
Idiyappam with egg masala curry

=== Achappam ===
Achappams are deep-fried rose cookies made with rice.

=== Kuzhalappam ===
Kuzhalappams are a typical Syrian Christian-Saint Thomas Christians dish, a fried crisp curled up like a tube.

=== Neyyappam ===
Neyyappams owe their origins to Kerala and have been a traditional offering in Hindu temples for God. They are made with rice flour, jaggery and clarified butter ghee, which is the traditional method of making Nei appams. The different cultures and religious practices introduced variations to the dish.

Unni appams are a variation in which mashed plantain is added to the batter. The batter is made out of rice flour, jaggery and plantain and is poured into a vessel called appakarai or appakaram, which has ghee heated to a high temperature. The appams take the shape of small cups and are fried until deep brown.

=== Kallappam ===
Kallappams are a traditional breakfast item of Kerala. They are made from fermented rice flour and coconut batter. Christians in Kerala prepare them on special occasions like Easter. The name is derived from kallu, Malayalam for palm toddy, the ingredient traditionally used for fermenting the rice flour. In modern preparation of the dish, yeast has replaced toddy.

=== Pesaha appam ===
Pesaha appams are made by Nasrani Christians in Kerala during Pesaha (Passover). This type of appam is dipped in syrup or pesaha pal (Passover coconut milk) before being served.

=== Vattayappam ===
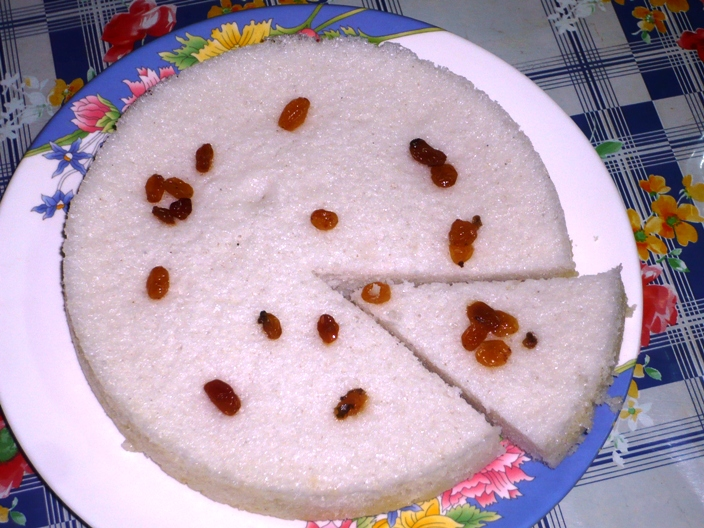
Vattayappam

Vattayappams are made from rice flour, sugar, and coconut. They are an oil-free tea-time snack in a majority of households in Kerala. The dish is made by steam-cooking the batter and is very similar to the bánh bò from Vietnam.

=== Burmese apon ===
Appams called apon (အာပုံ) in Burmese are a common street food in Burmese cuisine. They are considered a delicacy of Southern Myanmar, in coastal towns like Dawei and Myeik.

=== Kue apem ===
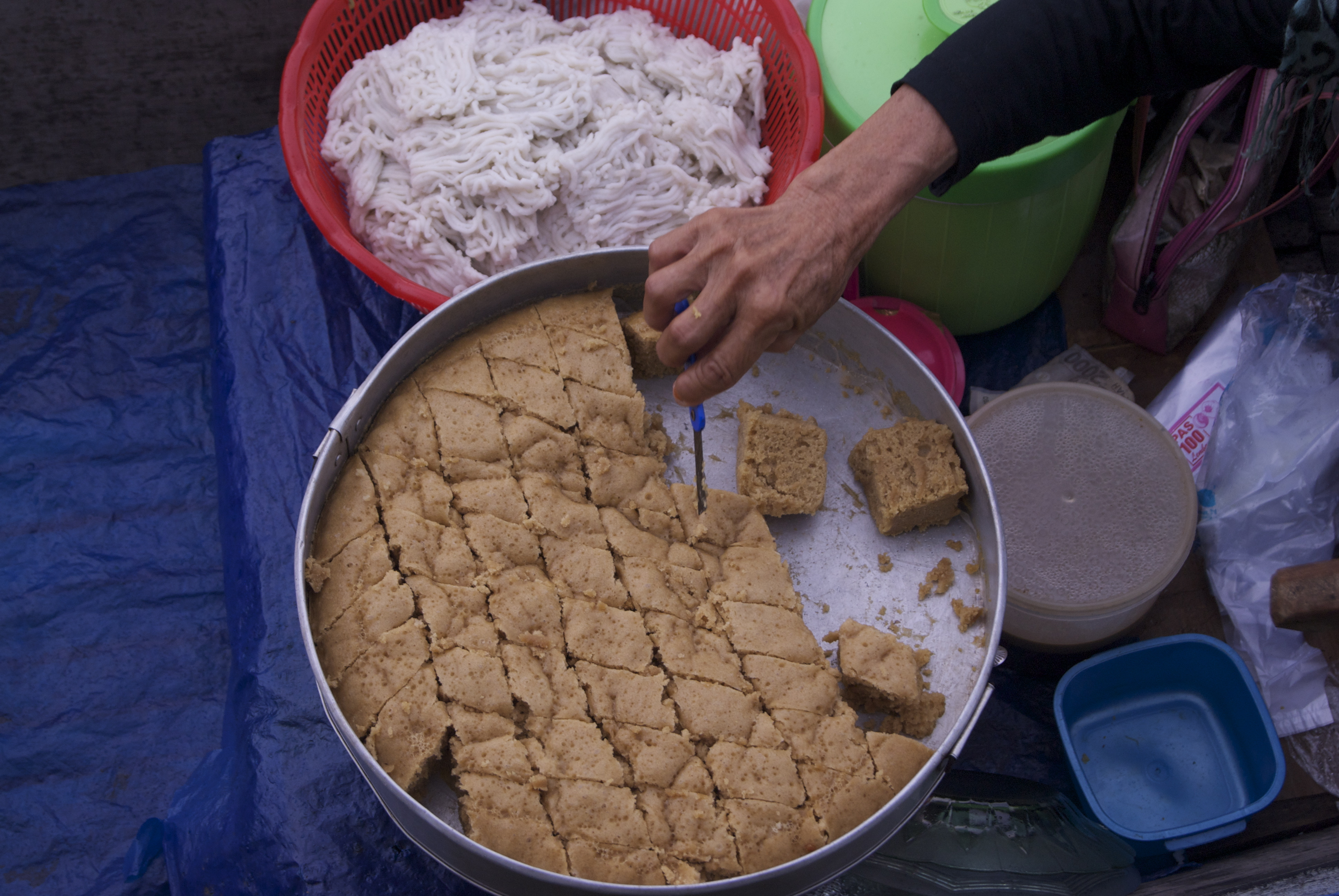
Indonesian kue apem, sold in Lok Baintan floating market, Banjar Regency, South Kalimantan

In Indonesia, a variant of appam is known as kue apem or kue apam is a kue, a traditional cake of steamed dough made of rice flour, coconut milk, yeast and palm sugar, usually served with grated coconut. Indonesian households traditionally made kue apem communally for celebration and festivities, such as Keraton Yogyakarta, a traditionally held Ngapem ceremony, where the royal household communally cooks it as a part of Tingalan Jumenengan Dalem ceremony. It is quite similar to kue mangkok.

=== Roti jala ===
Roti jala, popular in Malaysia, Indonesia and Singapore, is inspired by appam and travelled there from India likely in the 15th century.

== See also ==
- Lahoh
- Baghrir
- Apam balik
- Dosa (food)
- Uttapam
- List of fermented foods
- List of Indian breads
- List of pancakes
