= Kue pinyaram =

Minangkabau traditional cake

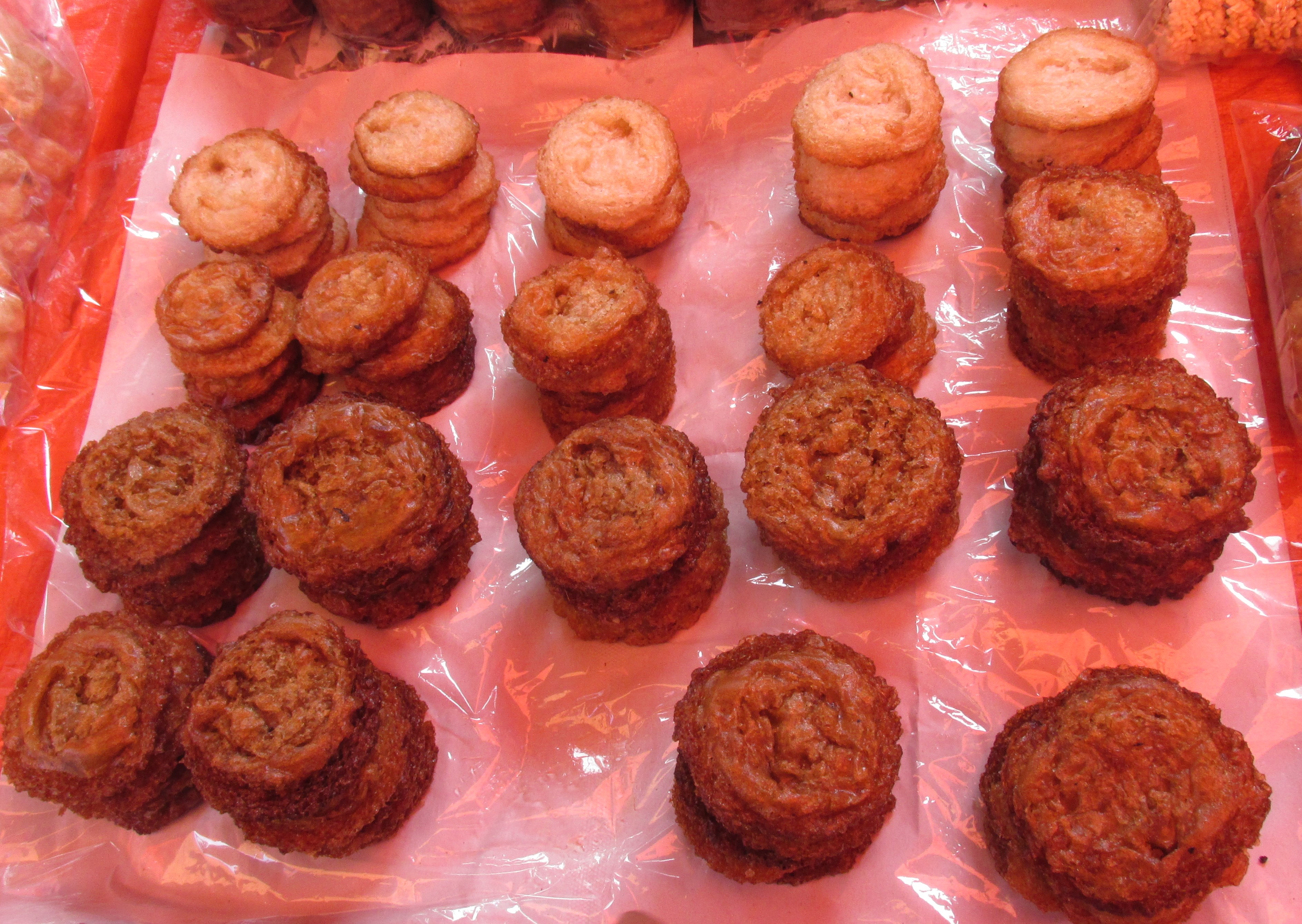
- Kue pinyaram being sold in traditional market
- Alternative names: Panyaram, penyaram
- Type: Cake, kue
- Course: Dessert, snack
- Place of origin: Indonesia
- Region or state: West Sumatra
- Main ingredients: Rice flour, corn flour, coconut milk, cooking oil

Pinyaram, panyaram, or penyaram (Jawi: ڤيڽرام) is traditional kue of Minangkabau in West Sumatra, Indonesia. This dish served during special occasions, such as wedding parties, Ramadan and Eid al-Fitr. Today, pinyaram can be used as typical souvenir of Minangkabau.

== Description ==
Pinyaram is made from mixture of white sugar or palm sugar, white rice flour or black rice, and coconut milk; the way the convection is cooked is similar to cooking pancakes.

== Variations ==
Pinyaram is mainly divided into two variants: pinyaram putih (made from white rice) and pinyaram hitam (made from black rice). Today, however, pinyaram can be colorful.

In neighbouring Brunei and Malaysia, there is an identical kuih called pinjaram found in the part of East Malaysia and Brunei. They are larger in size than most pinyaram in Indonesia.

== See also ==
- Panyalam
- Kuzhi paniyaram
- Æbleskiver - A similarly-fried Danish confectionery served with jam or powdered sugar.
- Khanom krok, a Thai dish
- Mont lin maya, a Burmese dish
- Neyyappam, a fermented South Indian sweet dumpling fried in Ghee
- Paddu, a fermented South Indian dumpling that can be made spicy with chillies or sweet with jaggery.
- Pinjaram, a Malaysian kuih
- Poffertjes, a Dutch sweet dish
- Takoyaki, a Japanese dish
- Unni appam, a fermented South Indian sweet dumpling made with fruits like Jackfruit or Banana
