= Æbleskiver =

Danish traditional batter cakes

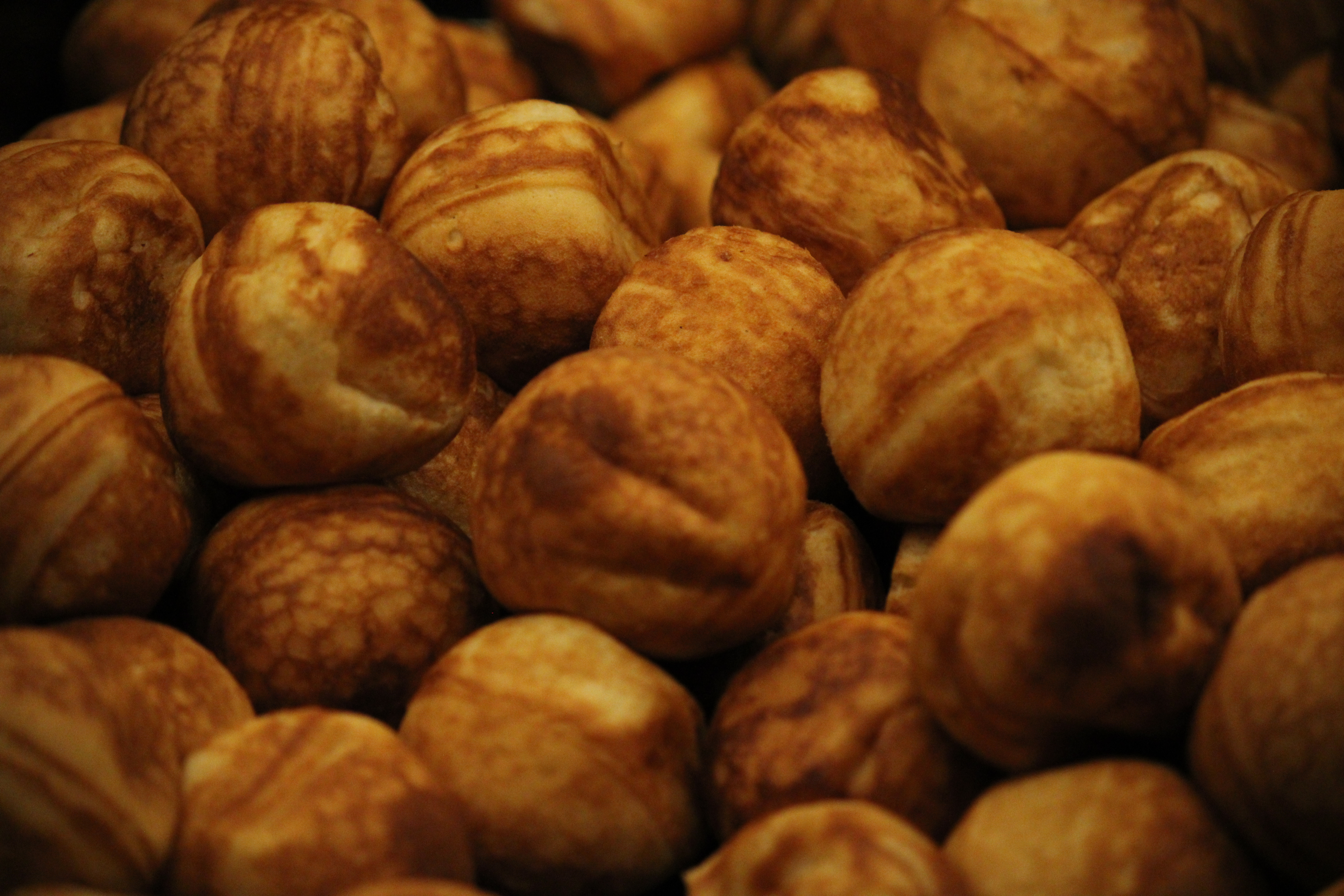
- Æbleskiver
- Course: Dessert, snack
- Place of origin: Denmark
- Serving temperature: Hot
- Main ingredients: Wheat flour, buttermilk, milk or cream, eggs, sugar

Æbleskiver (Danish pronunciation: [ˈeːpləˌskiːwɐ], [singular: æbleskive]) are spherical Danish snacks made from fried batter. The name literally means "apple slices" in Danish, although slices of apples are not an ingredient in present-day versions. The crust is similar in texture to European pancakes, but with a light and fluffy interior similar to a Yorkshire pudding. The English language spelling is usually aebleskiver, ebleskiver or ebelskiver.

== Æbleskive pan ==
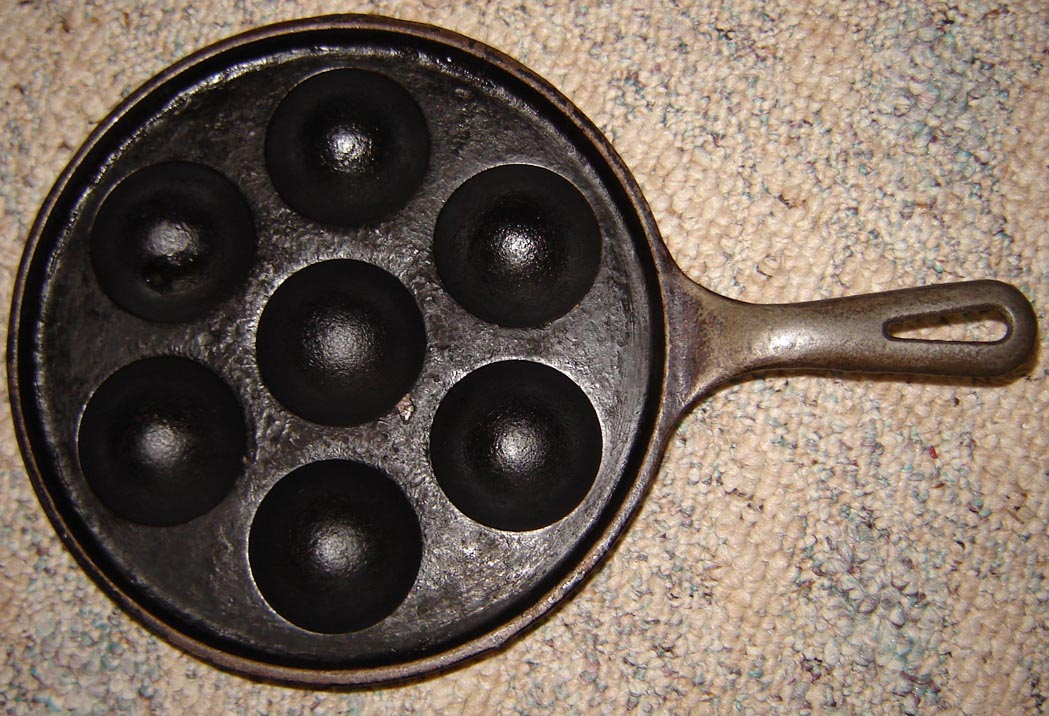
Top view of an æbleskive pan

Æbleskiver are cooked on the stovetop using a special pan with several hemispherical indentations. The pan exists in versions for gas and electric stoves (the latter with a plain bottom). Pans are usually made of cast iron which has increased heat retention. Traditional models in hammered copper plate exist but are today used primarily for decoration.

== Preparation ==
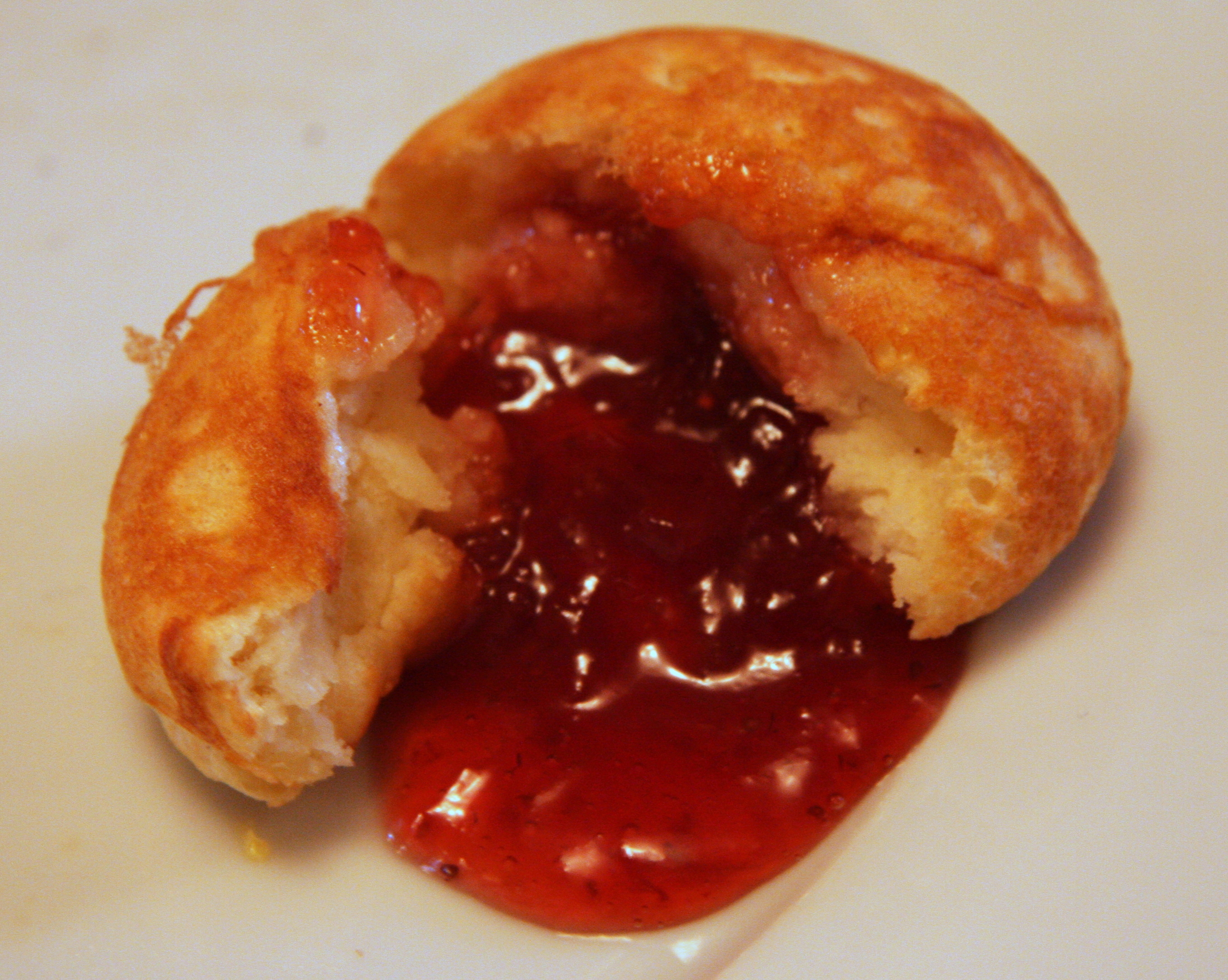
An æbleskive with jam

The batter for æbleskiver usually includes wheat flour, which is mixed with buttermilk, milk or cream, eggs, sugar, and salt. Some recipes also include fat (usually butter), cardamom and lemon zest to improve taste, and a leavening agent, most often baking powder, but sometimes yeast, to aerate the batter.

Batter is poured into the oiled indentations and as the æbleskiver begin to cook, they are turned with a knitting needle, skewer or fork to give the cakes their characteristic spherical shape. They were traditionally cooked with bits of apple (æble) or applesauce inside but these ingredients are very rarely included in modern Danish forms of the dish. Æbleskiver are not sweet themselves but are traditionally served dipped in raspberry, strawberry, black currant or blackberry jam and sprinkled with powdered sugar. Butter, maple syrup, and whipped cream are also popular toppings.

Æbleskiver are often bought pre-fried and frozen at supermarkets and then heated in the oven at home.

== Traditions ==
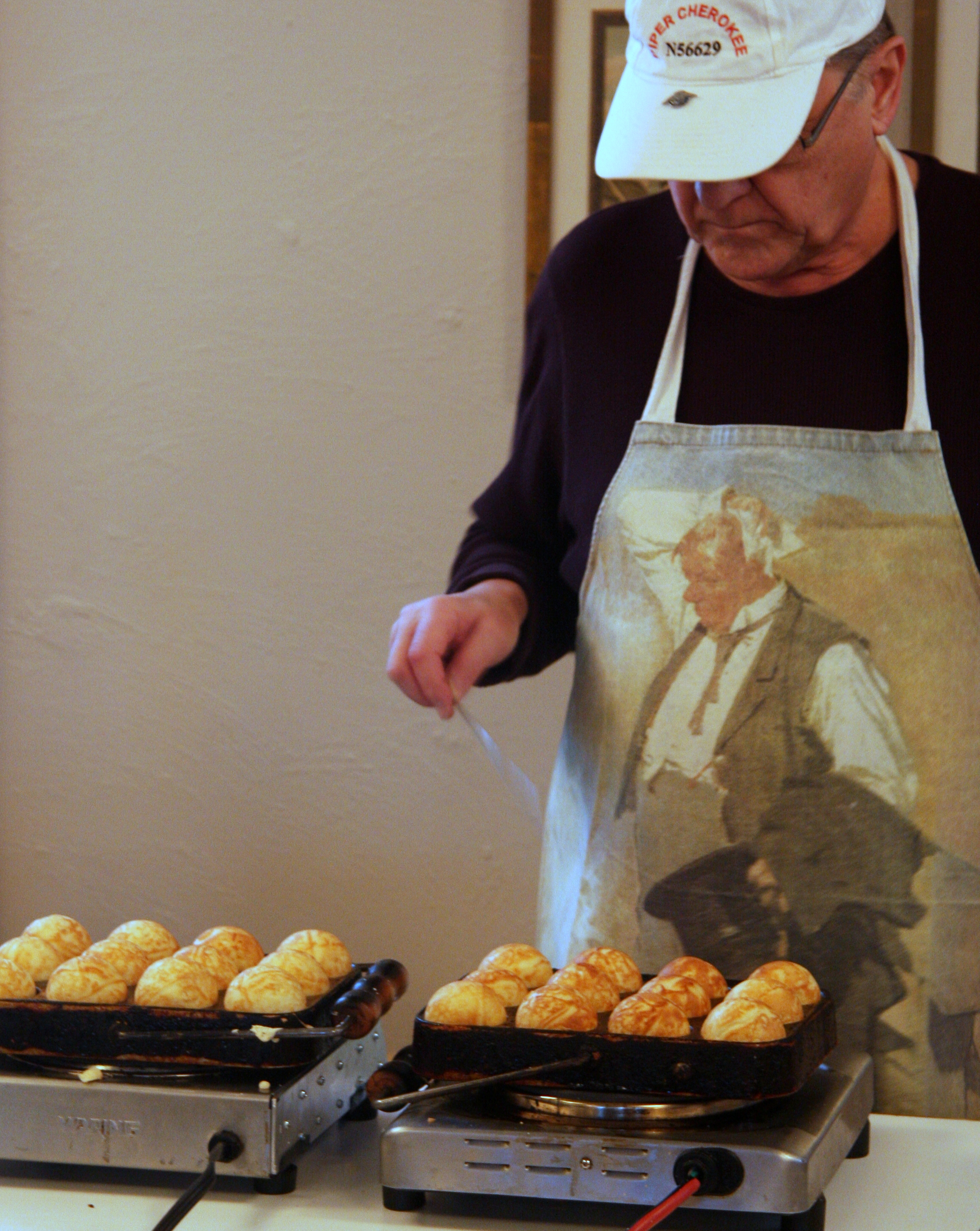
A man making æbleskiver at the Danish American Center in Minneapolis, Minnesota

In Denmark, æbleskiver are less common in restaurants than they are at casual family gatherings. They can also be found being sold by street vendors in the winter. They are traditionally served with jam and powdered sugar and three are placed on a plate at a time. They are traditionally eaten during the Christmas season and are often served with gløgg (Scandinavian mulled wine). They are often sold at Christmas markets, charity markets, open-air events, Scouting functions, local sports gatherings and similar venues. They are also served at children's birthday parties, due to their popularity and easy preparation. Voluntary associations make a profit from preparing them from the pre-fried, frozen stage and selling them, usually three at a time, with the usual condiments.

In North America there are several annual events that celebrate æbleskiver and Danish culture, with churches and museums holding "Æbleskiver Suppers" and similar events.

== History ==
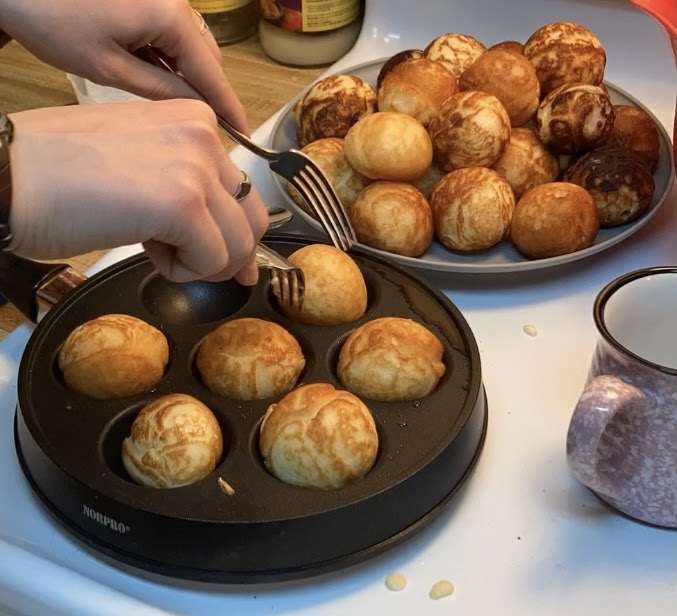
Æbleskiver being made at home on the stove.

The exact origin of æbleskiver is unknown. One popular speculation is that a band of Vikings were part of a difficult battle. When they returned to their ship, they wished to cook a meal similar to pancakes. However, since they lacked regular pans, they instead used their shields or helmets, resulting in a cake with a spherical shape.

According to another explanation, the custom of making a special sliced-apple dish originated in the Middle Ages when it was impossible to store raw apples beyond a certain date. The last apples of the year's harvest were sliced, used to flavor gløgg, scooped out of the gløgg, wrapped in dough, and fried in fat or butter like a Berliner. This is the origin of the name, which means "apple slices". In the 17th century, as cast iron pans with hemispherical concavities became available, æbleskiver could be easily made throughout the year, and the variety of fruit and other fillings expanded.

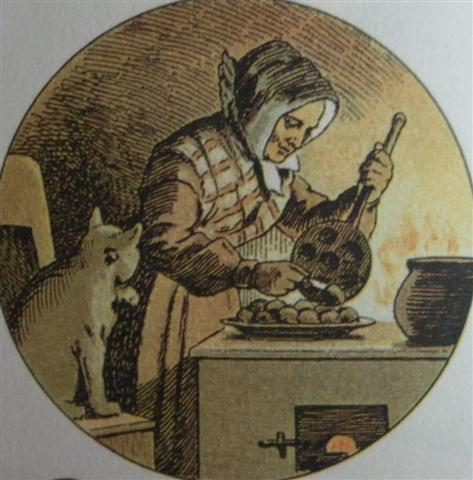
Illustration from 1889 printing of Peters Jul

The first appearance of the word "æbleskiver" occurs in Peters Jul (1866), a book of Yule poems by Johan Krohn (1841–1925; son of Frederik Christopher Krohn and brother of Pietro Krohn). "Apple-filled æbleskiver" are also mentioned in the 1872 story "The Cripple" (Krøblingen) by Hans Christian Andersen.

In the United States, pans were manufactured by Griswold Manufacturing.

== See also ==
- Puff Puff – African fried dough snack and pastry
- List of doughnut varieties
- Danish cuisine – Culinary traditions of Denmark
- Akok – Traditional Malaysian snack
- Gai daan jai – Hong Kong dish, a similar Hong Kong dish.
- Jemput-jemput – Malaysian and Indonesian fritter, similar Malaysian snack.
- Kue cucur – Indonesian traditional snack, similar Indonesian snack.
- List of pancakes
- Munker (bakverk), the Norwegian version.
- Paniyaram – Indian dish, a similar dish from the south of India that comes in sweet and savoury varieties.
- Poffertjes – Traditional Dutch batter treat, a similar Dutch dish that is sweet.
- Popover – Light, hollow roll made from an egg batter
- Takoyaki – Japanese appetizer, a savoury Japanese version that features octopus.
- Unni Appam – South Indian snack, a similar dish from Kerala that is made in both sweet and spicy styles.
