= Unni appam =

South Indian snack

Unni appam (Karollappam)
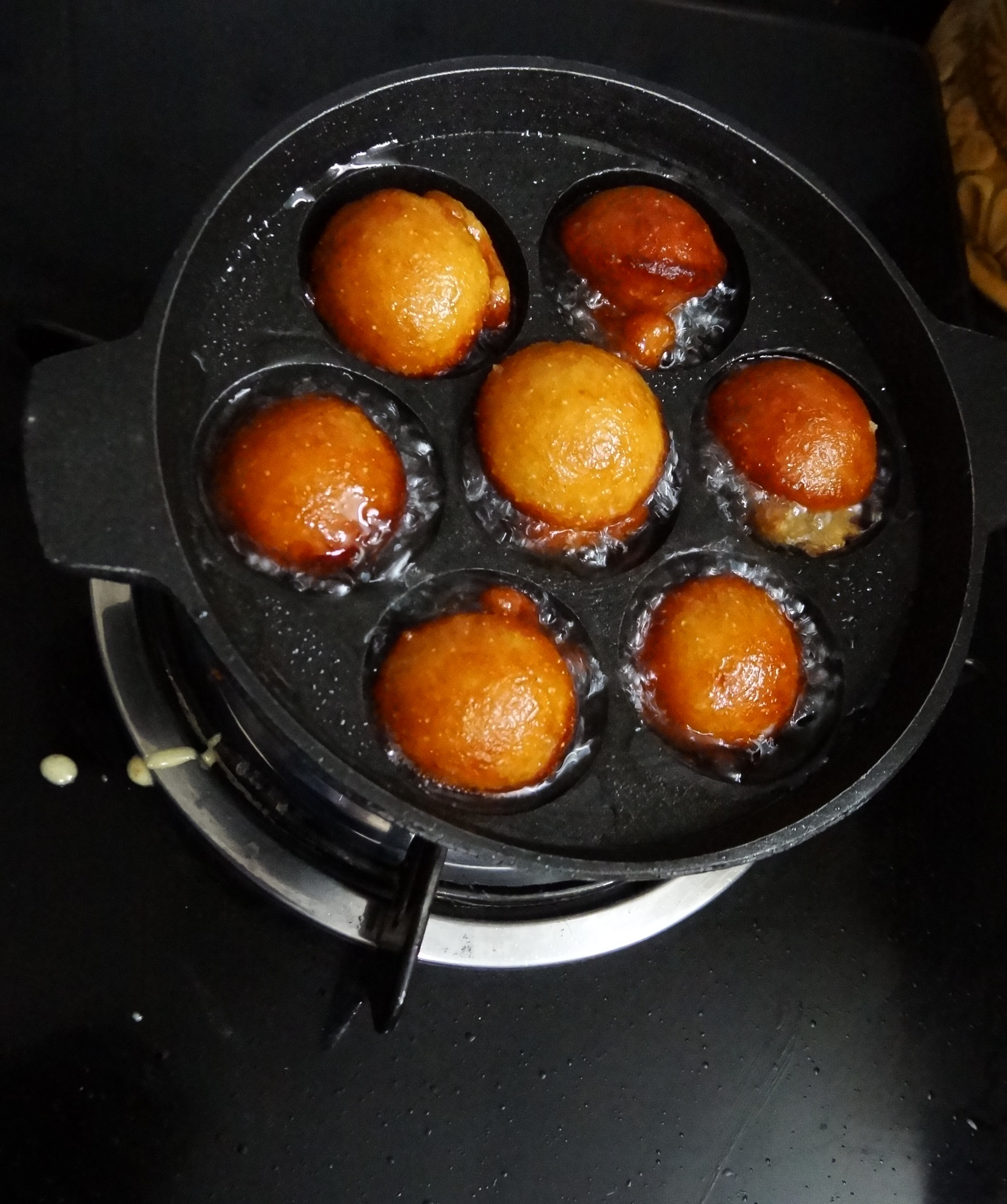
- Course: snack
- Place of origin: India
- Region or state: Kerala
- Main ingredients: Rice, jaggery, banana, ghee, sugar

Unni appam, unniyappam or karollappam (Malayalam: ഉണ്ണിയപ്പം) is a small round snack made from rice, jaggery, banana, roasted coconut pieces, roasted sesame seeds, ghee and cardamom powder fried in oil. Variations of this organic and spongy fried batter using jackfruit preserves instead of banana are common. It is a popular snack in Kerala. In Malayalam, unni means 'small' and appam means 'rice cake'.

== Preparation ==
The batter for unni appam is made from raw rice that is soaked and ground, sweetened with jaggery and mashed ripe banana, and flavoured with cardamom. Pieces of coconut fried in ghee are stirred into it. The batter is poured into the rounded moulds of a heavy pan called an unniyappakaara (also appakaara) and fried in oil or ghee. Each piece is turned once so that both sides brown, leaving the surface crisp and the inside soft.

== Consumption ==
Unni appam is eaten as a snack and is made at home for festivals, including Onam. It is a favourite of children; during Pilleronam, a children's version of Onam, mothers traditionally prepared unniyappam for them.

== See also ==
- Æbleskiver – a similarly fried Danish confectionery served with jam or powdered sugar
- Khanom krok – a Thai dish
- Mont lin maya – a Burmese dish
- Neyyappam – a fermented South Indian sweet dumpling fried in ghee
- Paddu – also known as kuzhipaniyaram; a fermented South Indian dumpling that can be made spicy with chillies or sweet with jaggery
- Pinjaram – a Malaysian kuih
- Pinyaram – an Indonesian dish
- Poffertjes – a Dutch pancake made out of buckwheat
- Serabi – an Indonesian pancake

== Gallery ==
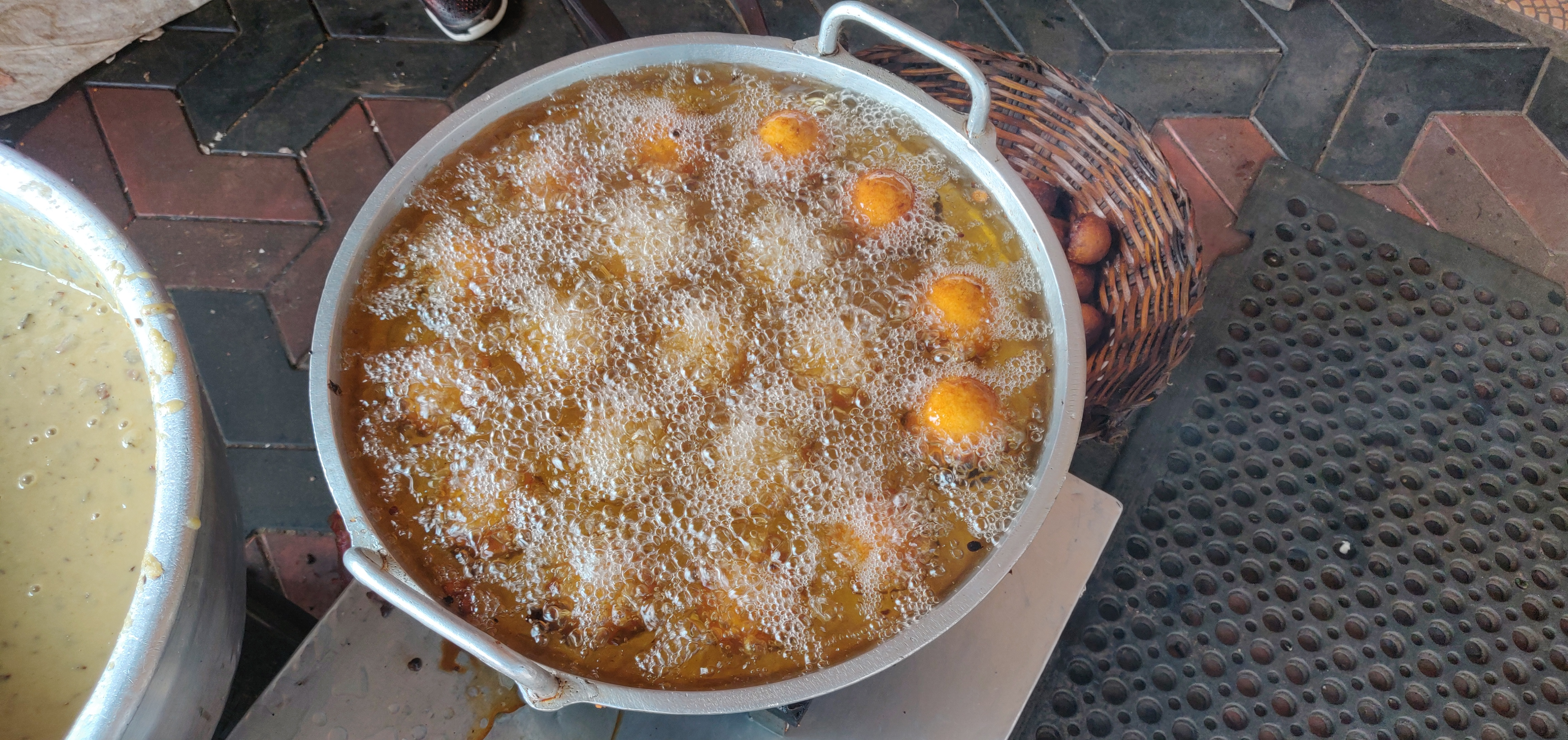
Frying Unni Appam in traditional appa chatti

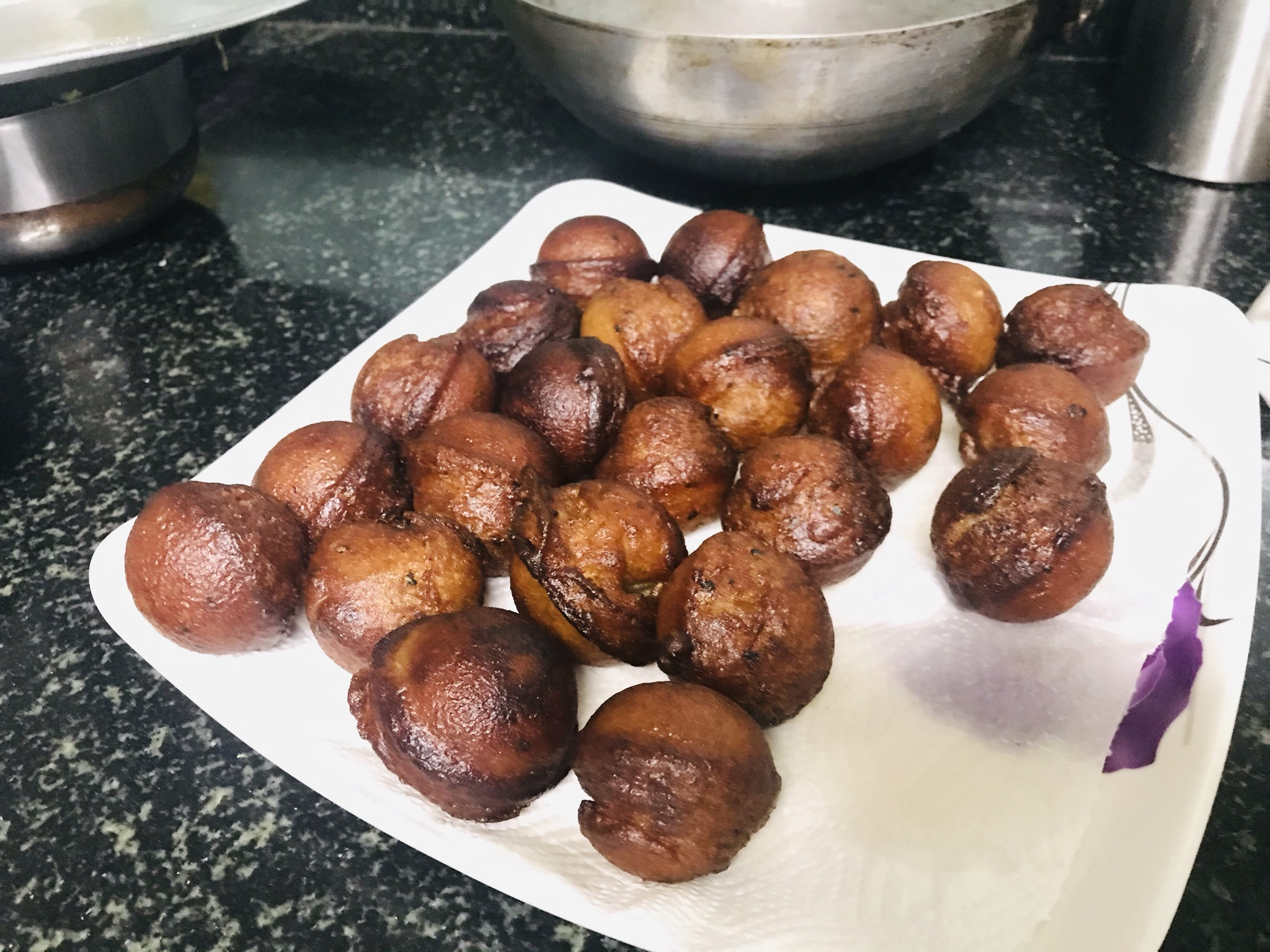
Unni Appam served on a plate
