= Paddu =

Indian dish

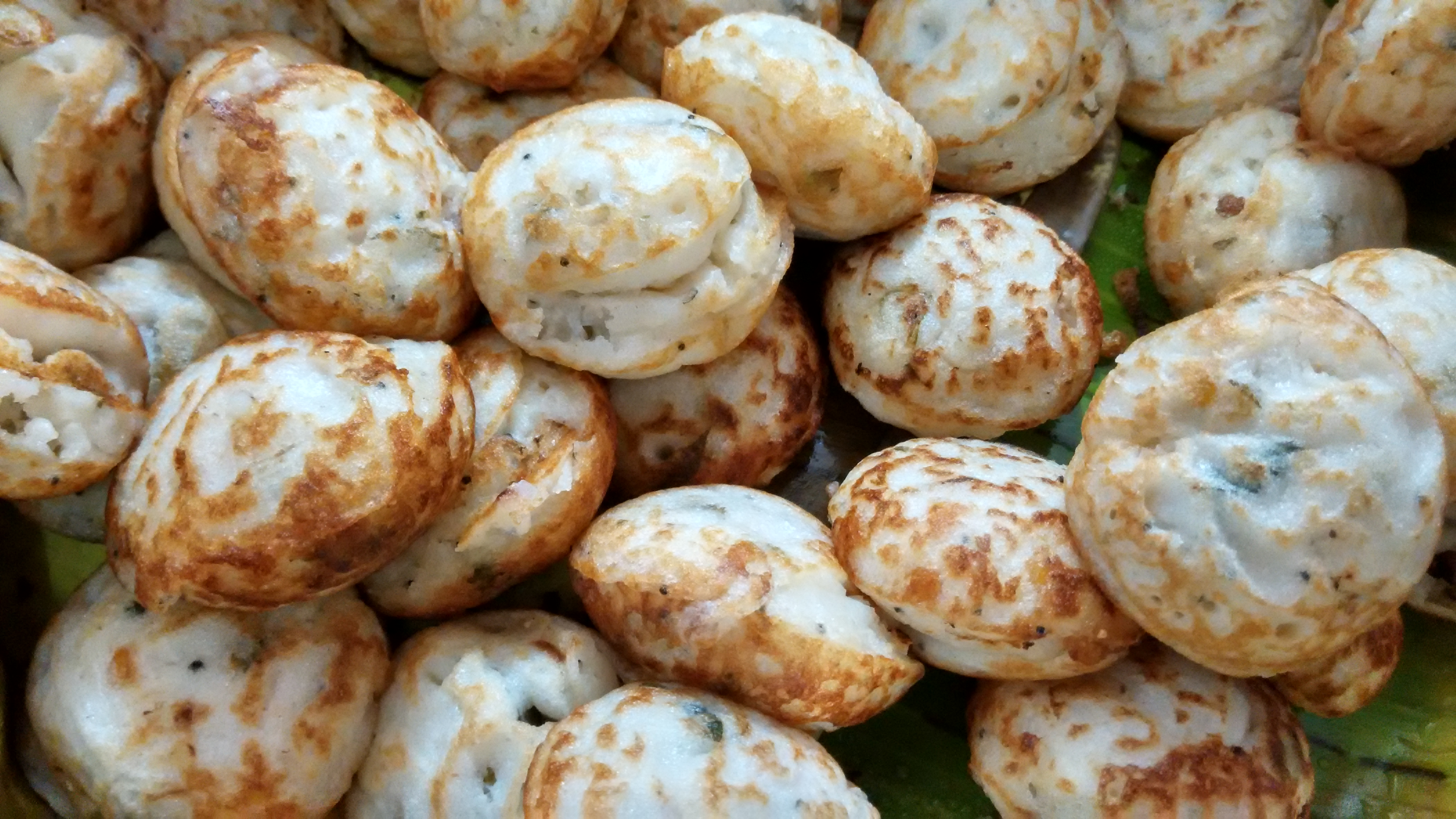
- Ponganalu with Coconut chutney and Hyacinth Bean Palya
- Alternative names: Paniyaram, Ponganalu, Kuzhi paniyaram, appe
- Course: Tiffin
- Place of origin: India
- Region or state: Karnataka, Tamil Nadu, Telangana, Andhra Pradesh, and Maharashtra
- Main ingredients: rice and black lentils batter
- Similar dishes: Panyalam, Pinjaram, Kuzhi Pinyaram, Takoyaki

Paddu (Kannada: ಪಡ್ಡು, ಗುಳಿಯಪ್ಪ) is an Indian dish made by steaming batter using a mould. It is named variously paniyaram, guliyappa, yeriyappa, gundponglu, bugga, Kuḻi paniyaram (Tamil: குழிப்பணியாரம்), Gunta Ponganalu (Telugu: గుంట పొంగనాలు), or Tulu: appadadde, appe (Marathi: आप्पे). The batter is made of black lentils and rice and is similar in composition to the batter used to make idli and dosa. The dish can either be made spicy with chillies or sweet with jaggery respectively. Paddu is made on a special pan that comes with multiple small indentations.

== Gallery ==
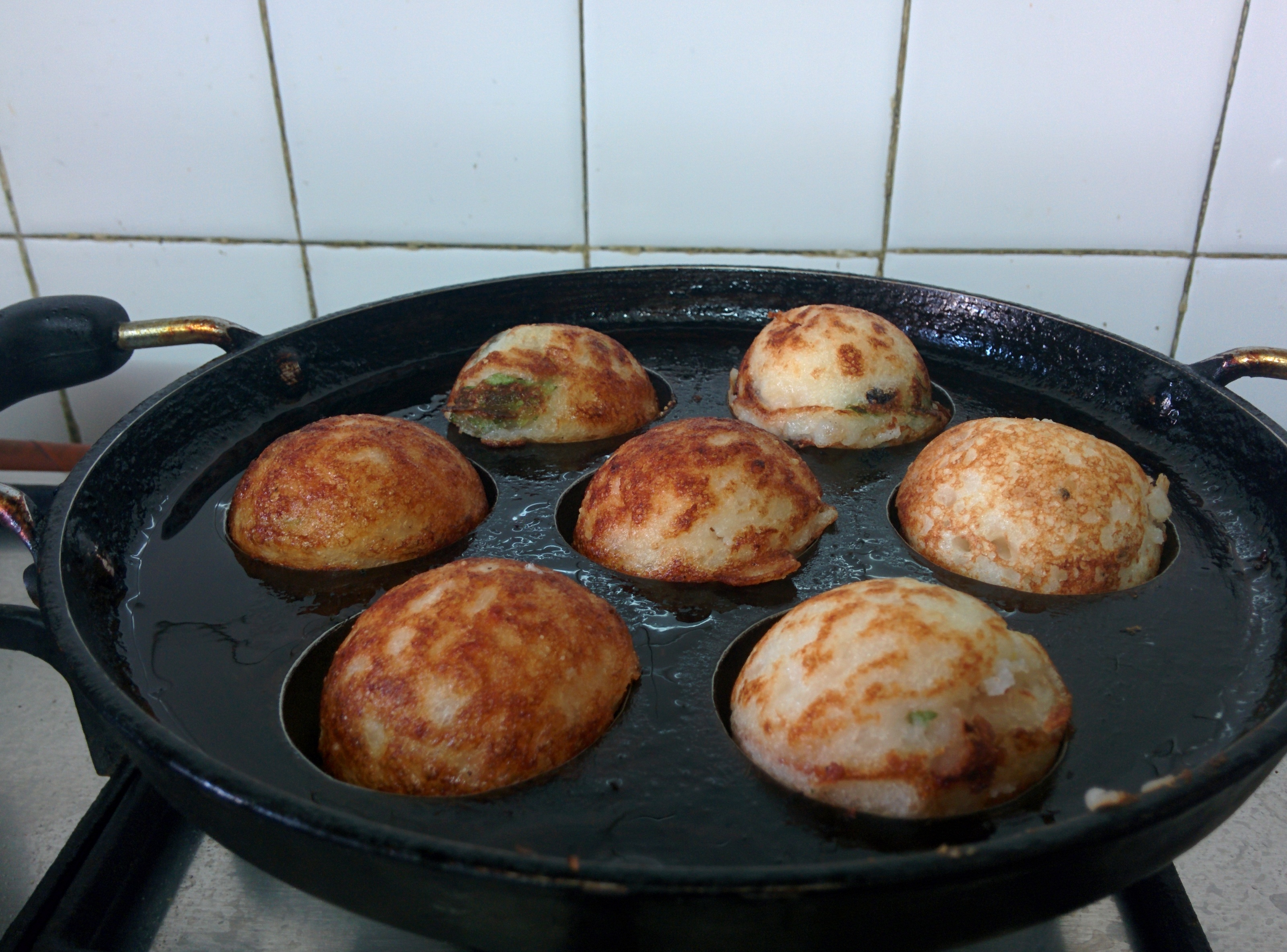
Paddu

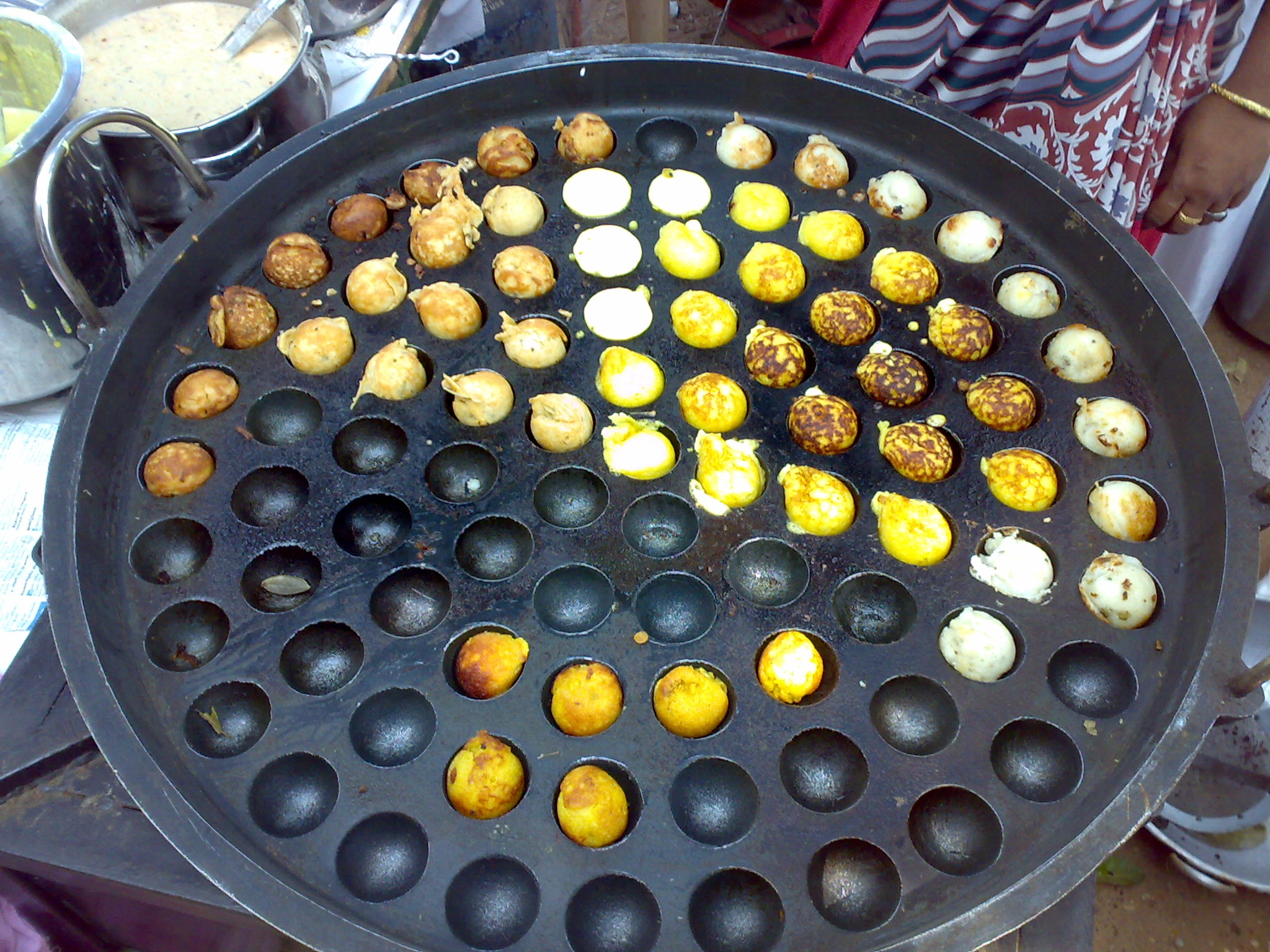
Paddu making

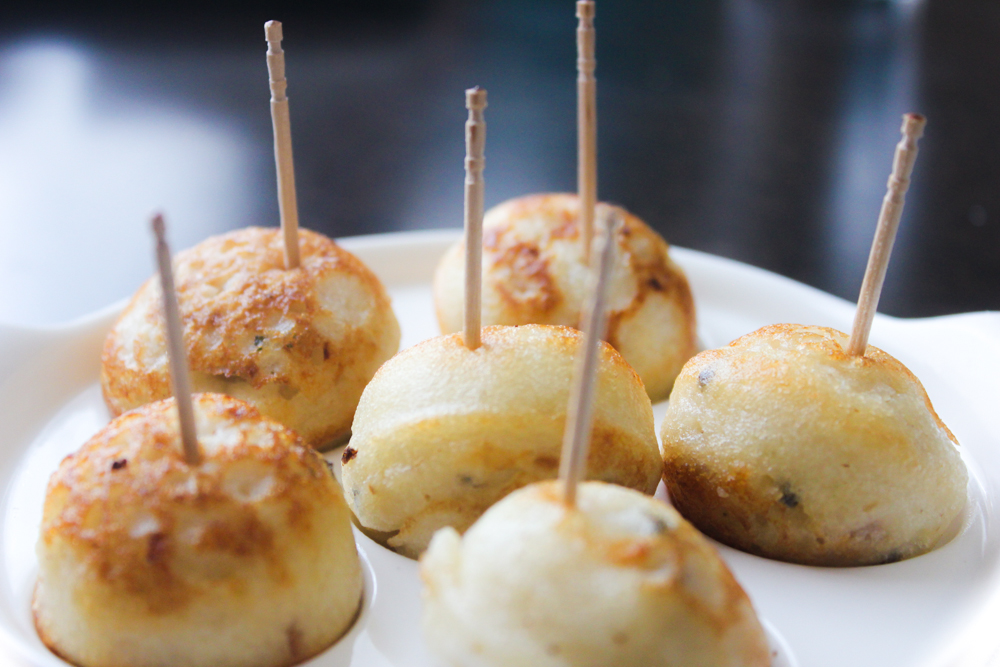
Paddu

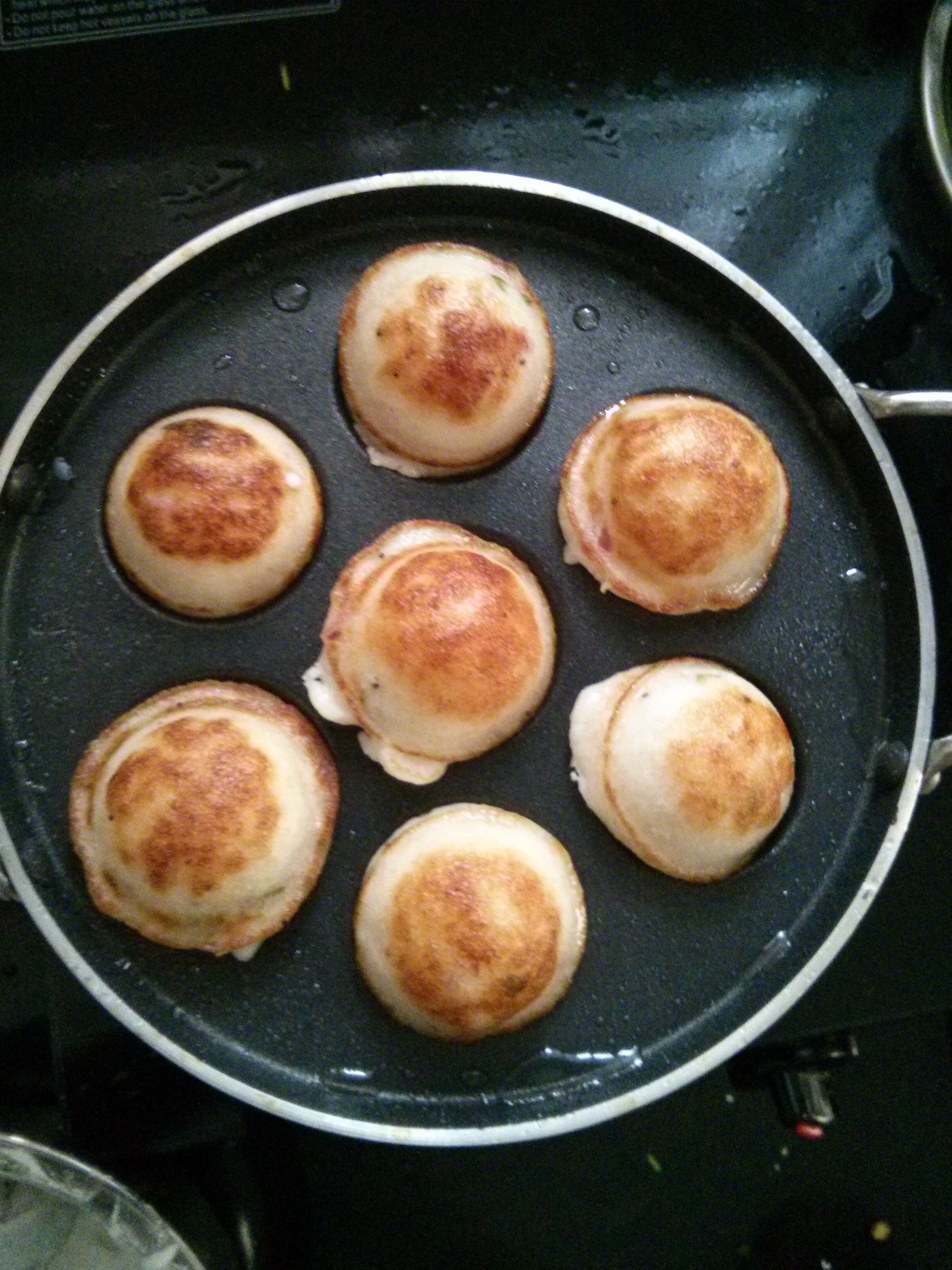
Guliyappa being prepared

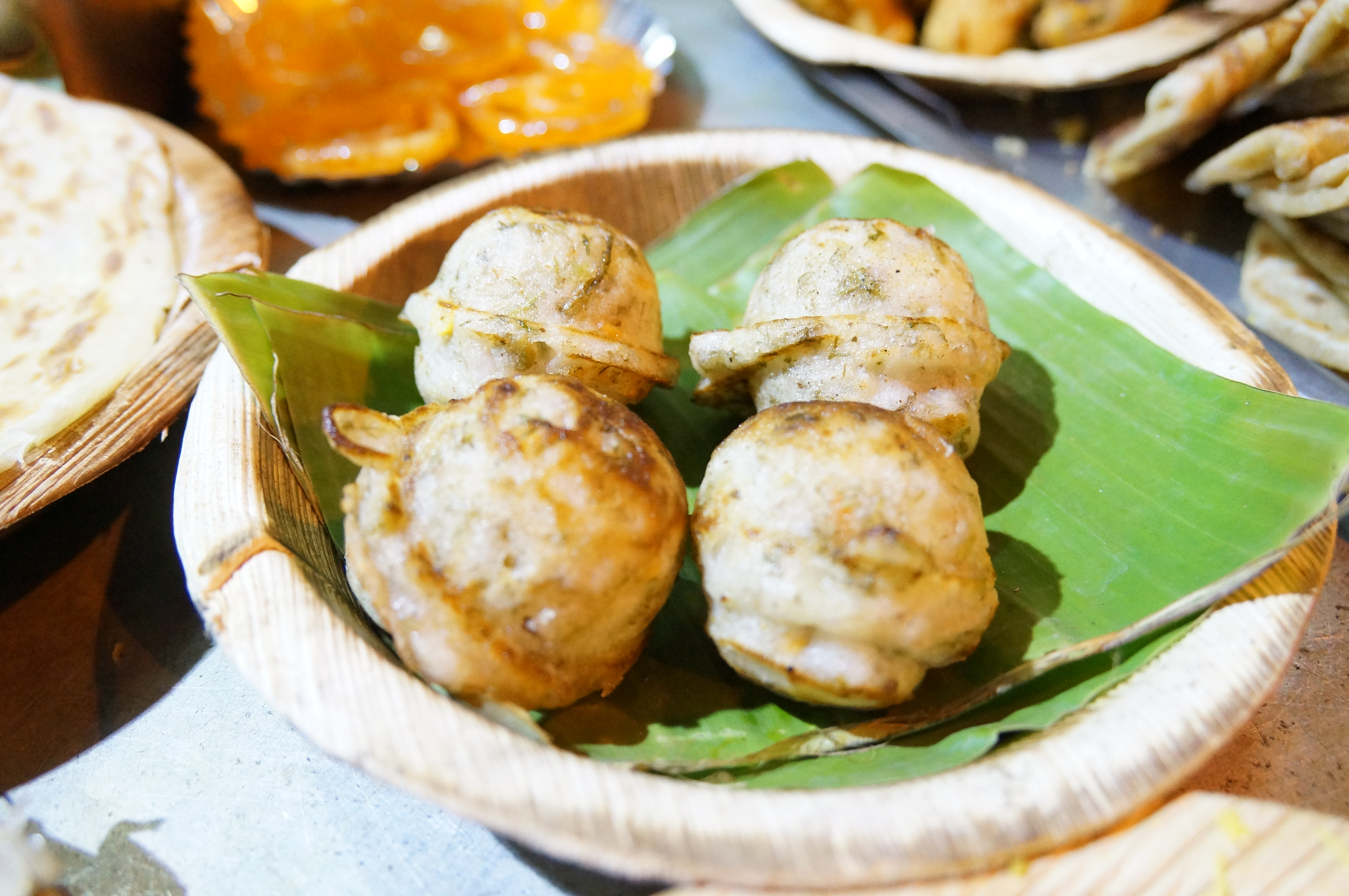
Paddus/Guliyappa

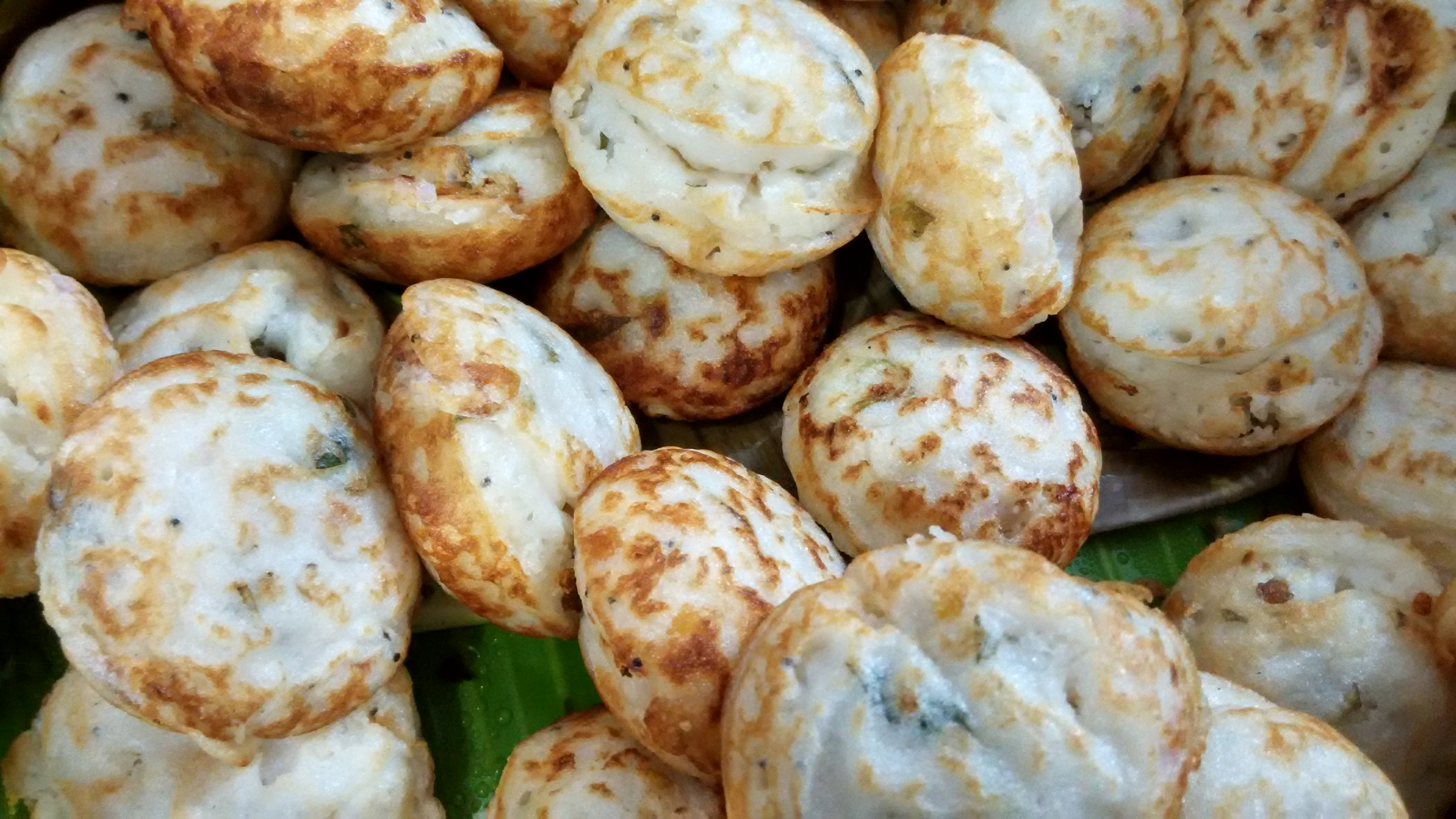
Prepared Paddu

== See also ==
- Æbleskiver, a Danish sweet dish
- Khanom krok, a Thai dish
- Mont lin maya, a Burmese dish
- Neyyappam, a fermented South Indian sweet dumpling fried in Ghee
- Pinjaram, a Malaysian kuih
- Pinyaram, an Indonesian dish
- Poffertjes, a Dutch sweet dish
- Takoyaki, a Japanese dish
- Unni appam, a fermented South Indian sweet dumpling made with fruits like Jackfruit or Banana
