= Jemput-jemput =

Malaysian and Indonesian fritter

Cekodok
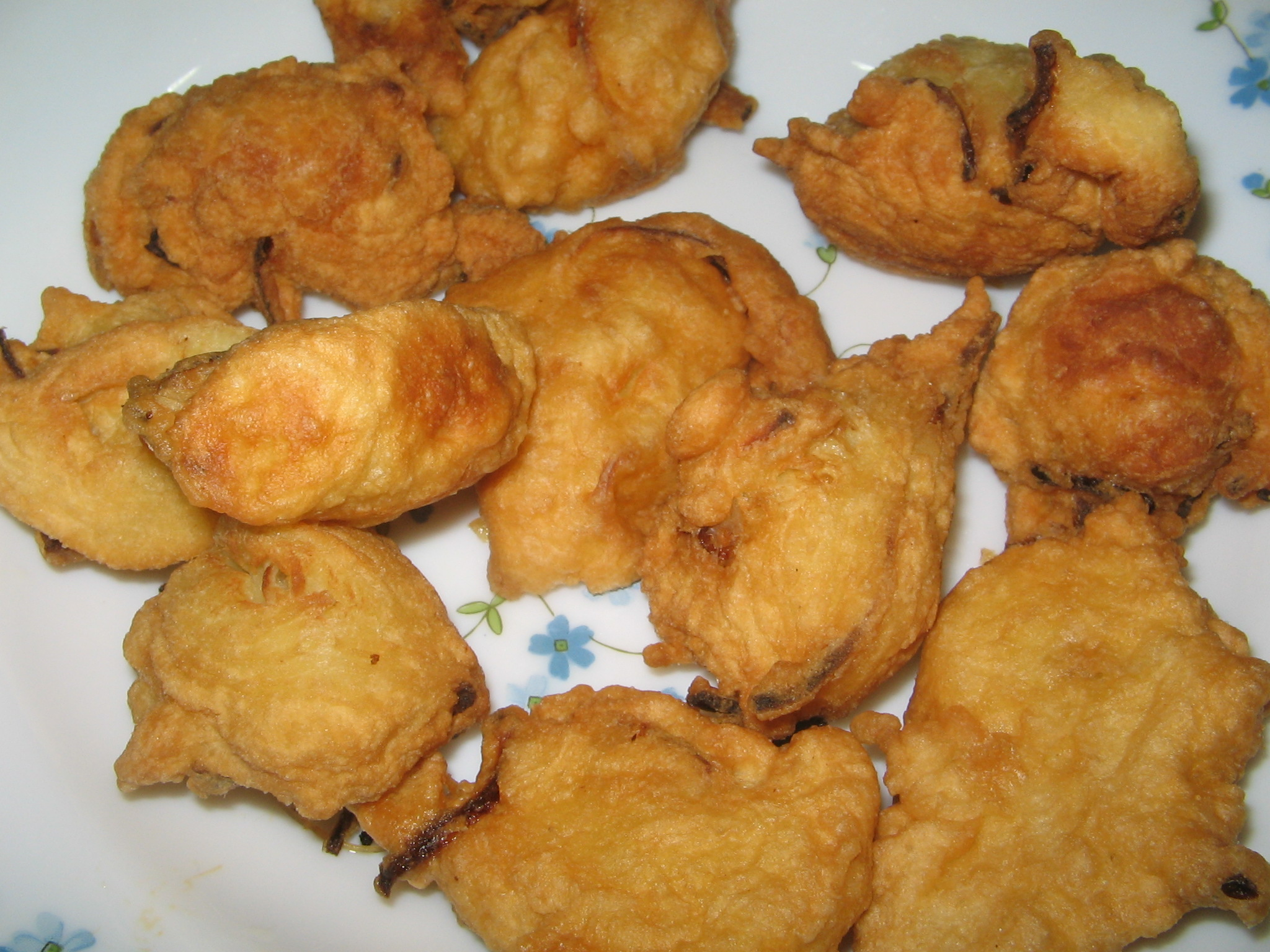
- An onion jemput-jemput.
- Alternative names: Cekodok
- Type: Snack
- Course: Snack
- Place of origin: Indonesia and Malaysia
- Associated cuisine: Malaysian, Indonesian, Singaporean, Bruneian
- Serving temperature: Hot
- Main ingredients: Flour (alternative ingredients for flavours: banana, anchovies, prawns, onion or maize)

Jemput-jemput or cekodok is a traditional fritter popular in Malaysia, Brunei, Indonesia and Singapore that is made from wheat flour. It is usually round in shape and tends to vary in size. There are many varieties of this snack, some using banana, anchovies or prawns, onion or maize.
