= Neyyappam =

South Indian snack

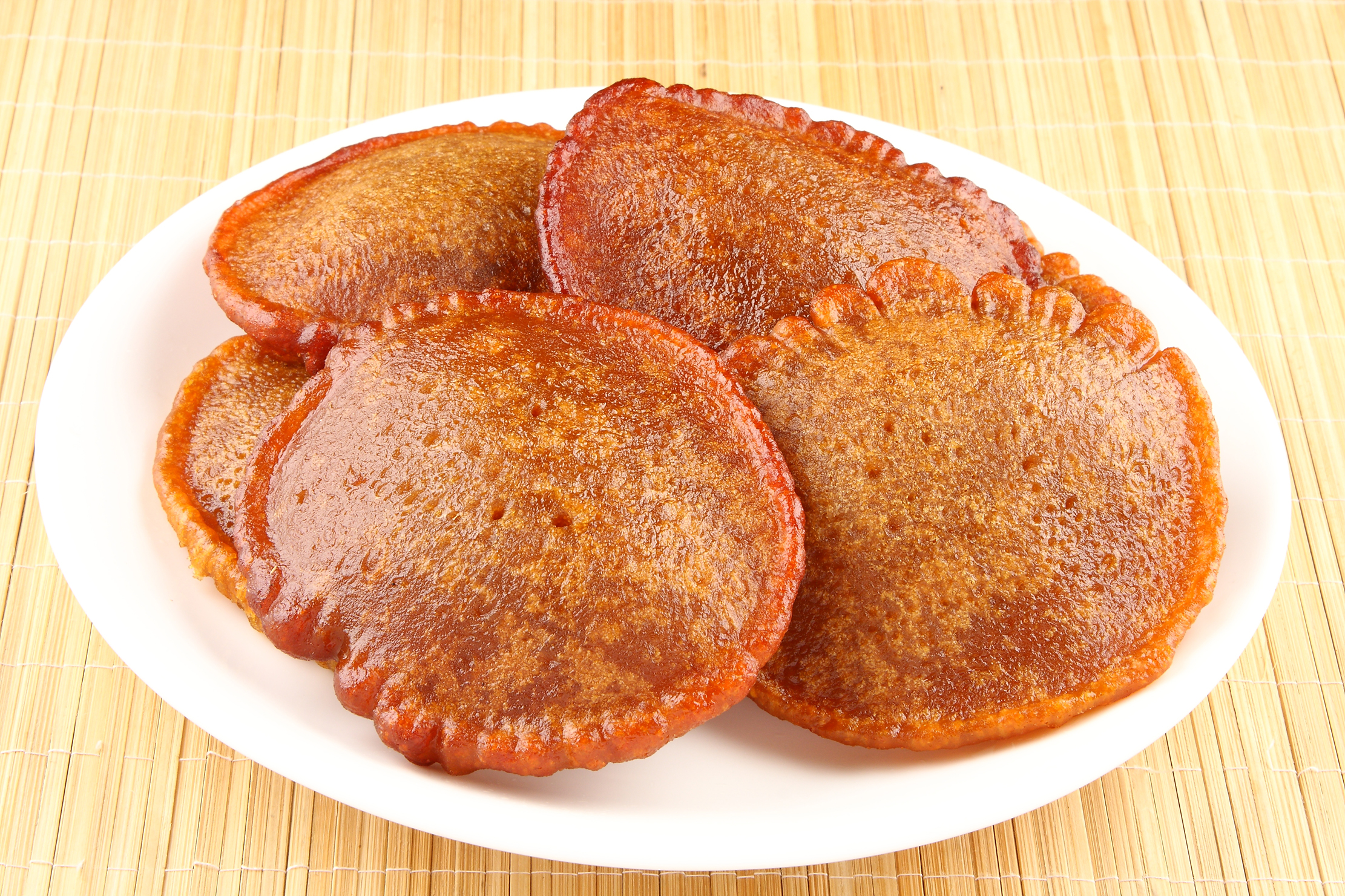
- Neyyappam, a sweet ghee-fried rice fritter
- Alternative names: നെയ്യപ്പം (Malayalam)
- Course: Dessert, snack
- Place of origin: India
- Region or state: Kerala, Coastal Karnataka
- Main ingredients: Ghee, rice flour, jaggery, coconut
- Variations: Unni appam

Neyyappam (Malayalam: നെയ്യപ്പം) or Yeriyappa is a sweet rice-based fritter fried in ghee. Neyyappam has its origins in the southern Indian state of Kerala and coastal Karnataka. The name is derived from the words neyy (നെയ്യ്) meaning "ghee" (clarified butter) and appam (അപ്പം) meaning "pancake".

Neyyappam is typically made of rice flour (alternatively, with semolina), jaggery, ghee-fried coconut (pieces or grated), ghee, cardamom and milk. It is served as a tea time snack usually in the evenings. Neyyappam is also served as offering in Hindu temples in Kerala. It is mainly main during Navaratri and Kartika Deepotsava. This practice has also been adopted by some sections of Christians in Kerala.

Unni appam is a variant in which mashed ripe plantains or bananas are added to the batter and fried to result in a ball-like shape.

Neyyappam became a topic of discussion as its name was shown on the home page of the Android N naming campaign. The official video of Google about naming Android N also shows a glimpse of neyyappam and Kerala tourism made a tweet about this naming campaign.

== Preparation ==
In traditional Kerala cuisine, Neyyappam is cooked in a bronze pan called appakara (ml:അപ്പക്കാര) (also known as Paniyaram Pan in Tamil Nadu), about 8 inches in diameter, having three or more large cavities and thereby giving the dish a tortoise-like shape. It can also be cooked on a griddle or in a skillet. Recipes vary from place to place, especially the ingredients chosen to prepare the batter.

== See also ==
- Appam
- Idiyappam
- Pesaha appam
- Unni Appam
- Kue cucur, similar Indonesian snack.
