= Mont lin maya =

Crisp, round savory pancake

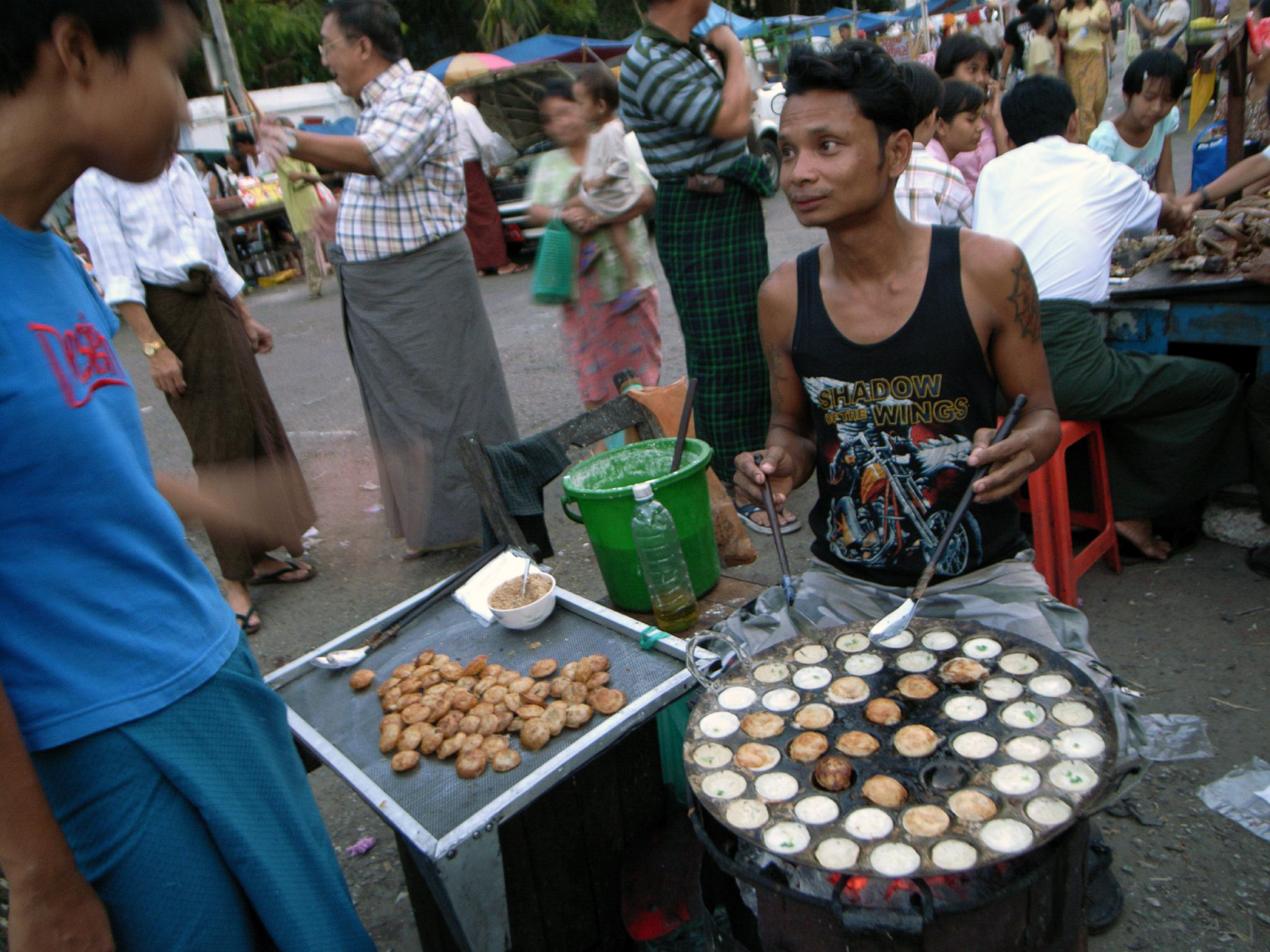
- A Burmese hawker making mont lin maya
- Type: Snack
- Place of origin: Myanmar (Burma)
- Region or state: Southeast Asia
- Associated cuisine: Burmese
- Main ingredients: Rice flour, chickpeas, spring onions, quail eggs
- Similar dishes: Banh khot, khanom krok, paddu, serabi, takoyaki

Mont lin maya (Burmese: မုန့်လင်မယား; pronounced [mo̰ʊɴ lɪ̀ɴməjá]; also spelt mont lin mayar) is a traditional Burmese street snack or mont. The Burmese name literally means "husband and wife snack", and is also known as mont ok galay (မုန့်အုပ်ကလေး, lit. 'little covered snack') or mont maung hnan (မုန့်မောင်နှံ, lit. 'couple snack') in Mawlamyine and Upper Myanmar.

The dish consists of crisp, round savory pancakes made with a batter consisting of rice flour, quail eggs, chickpeas, and spring onions, fried in a special metal pan.

== Similar dishes ==
Similar desserts in the region include Vietnamese bánh khọt, Indonesian serabi, Thai khanom krok, Indian paddu, and Japanese takoyaki.
