= List of pancakes =

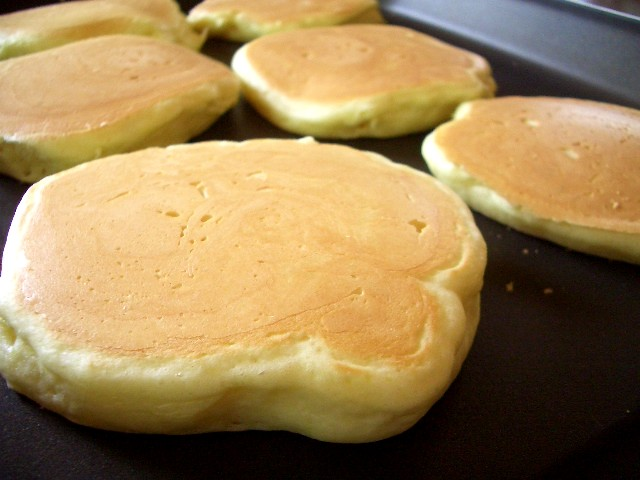
Pancakes cooking on a griddle

This is a list of notable pancakes. A pancake is a flat cake, often thin and round, prepared from a starch-based batter and cooked on a hot surface such as a griddle or frying pan. In Britain, pancakes are often unleavened, and resemble a crêpe. In North America, a raising agent is used (typically baking powder). The North American pancake is similar to a Scotch pancake or drop scone.

== Pancakes ==
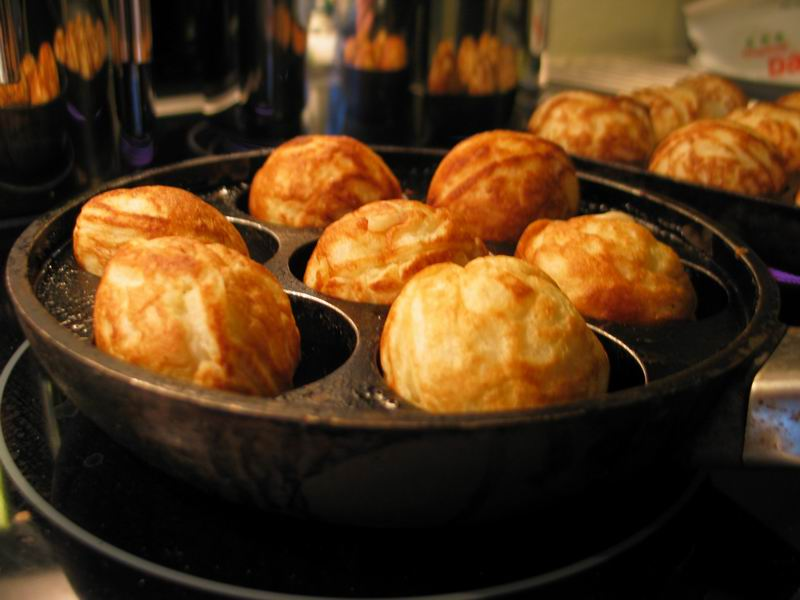
Æbleskiver is a traditional Danish dessert. If served in December, it is often accompanied by Gløgg.

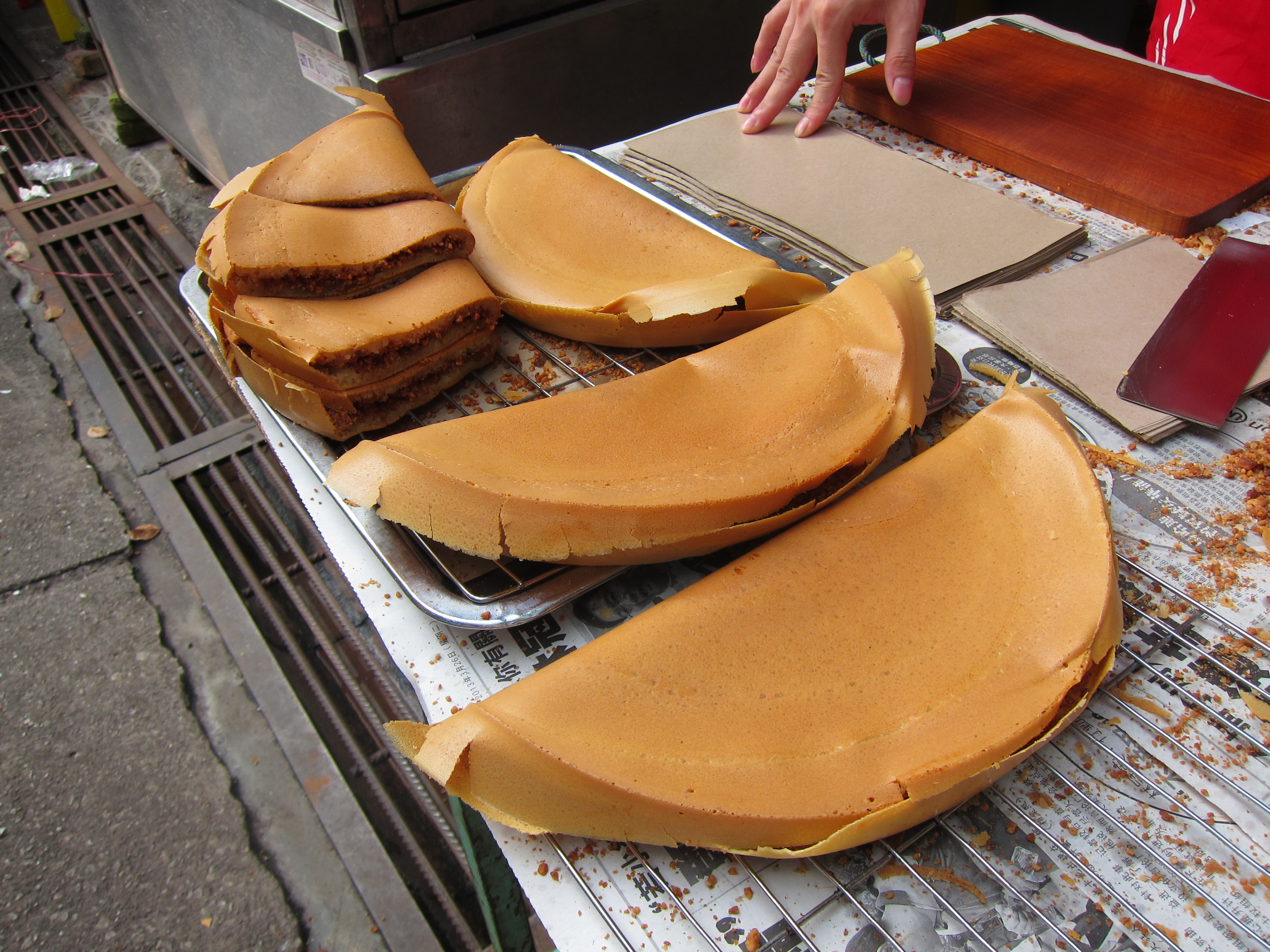
Giant apam balik pancakes at a hawker stall in Malaysia

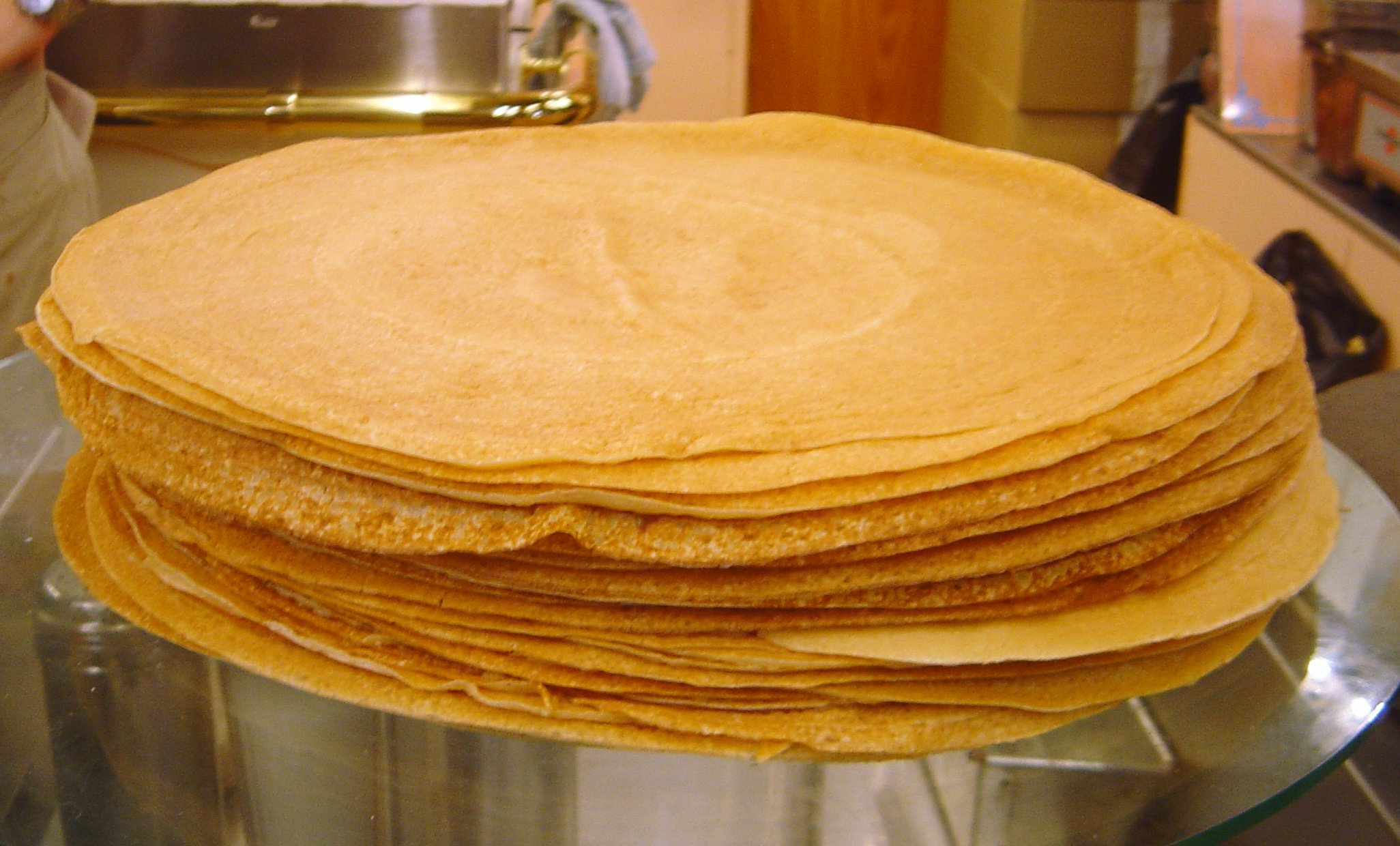
A stack of plain crêpes

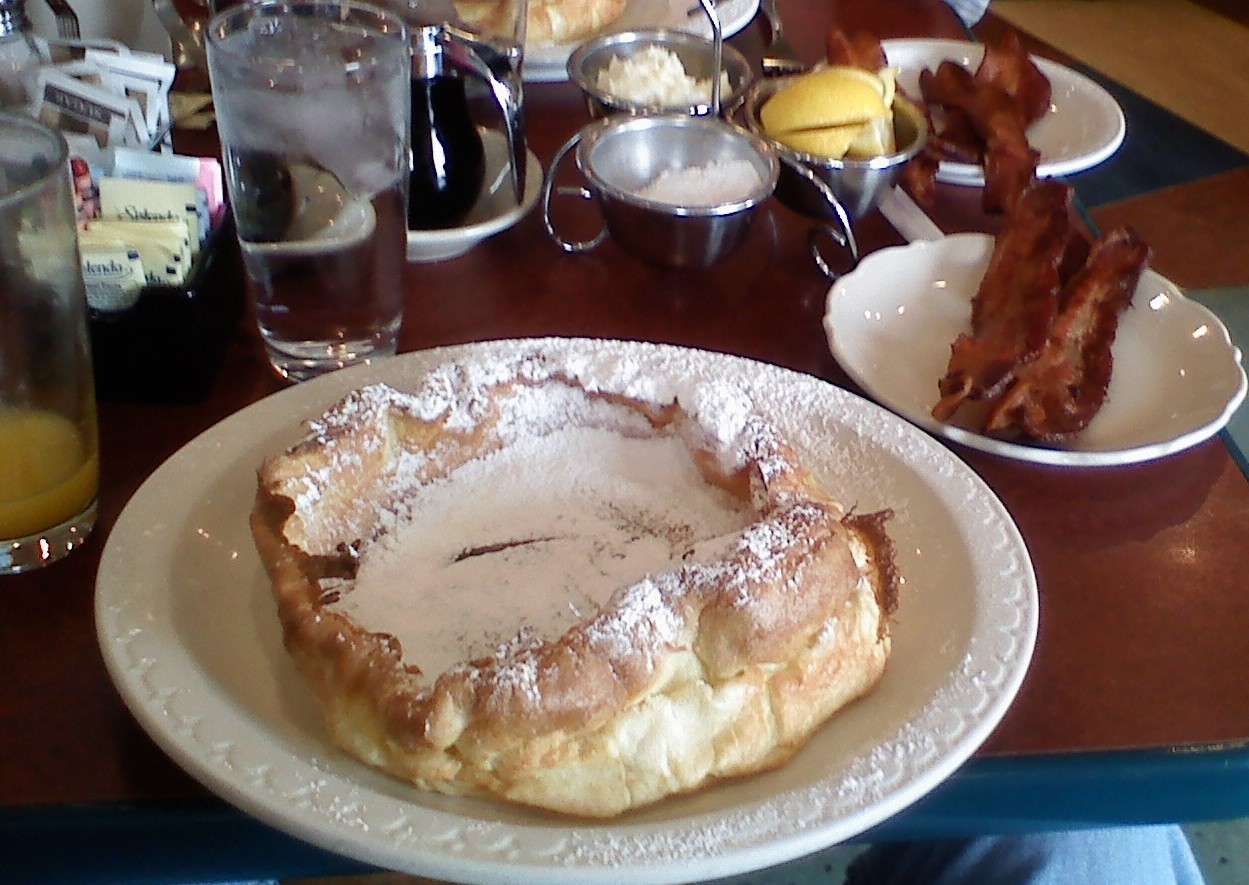
A Dutch baby pancake served with lemon slices, powdered sugar and butter

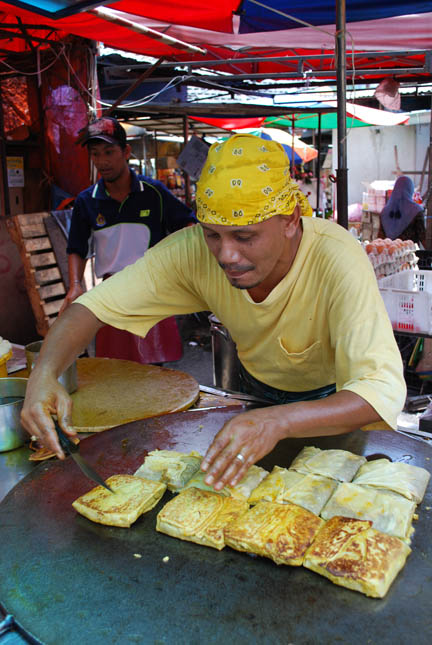
Murtabak cooking on a griddle

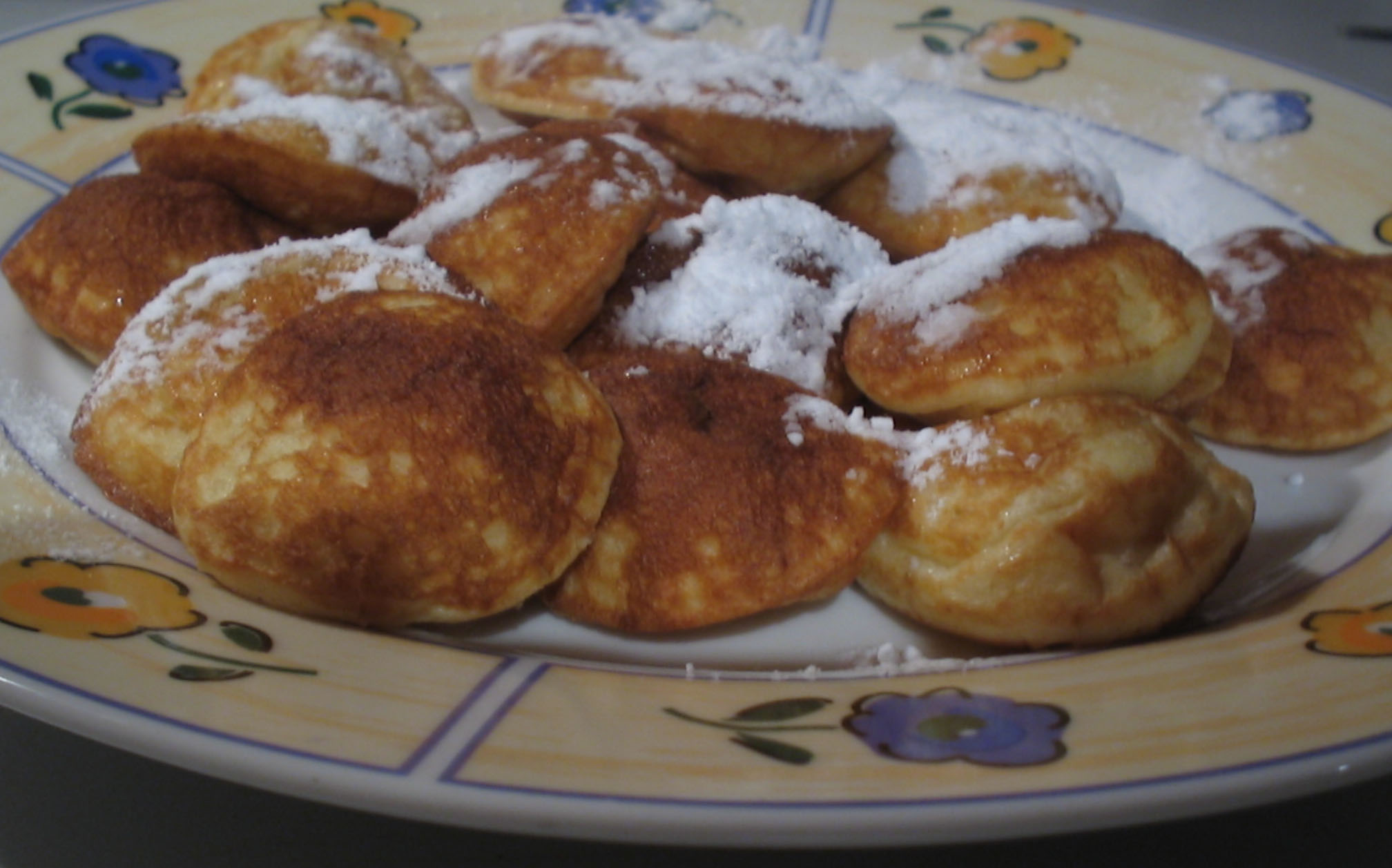
Poffertjes

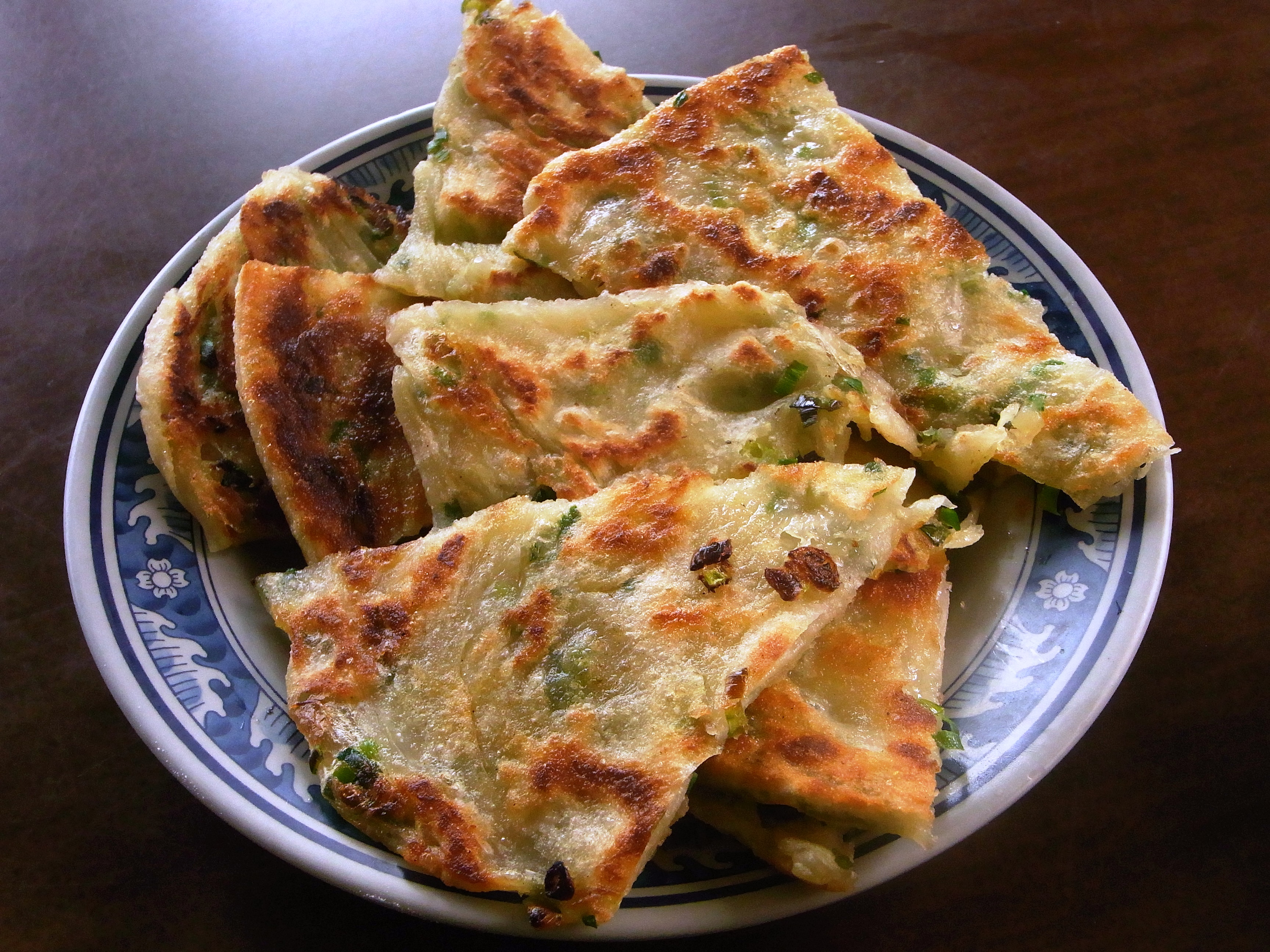
A scallion pancake

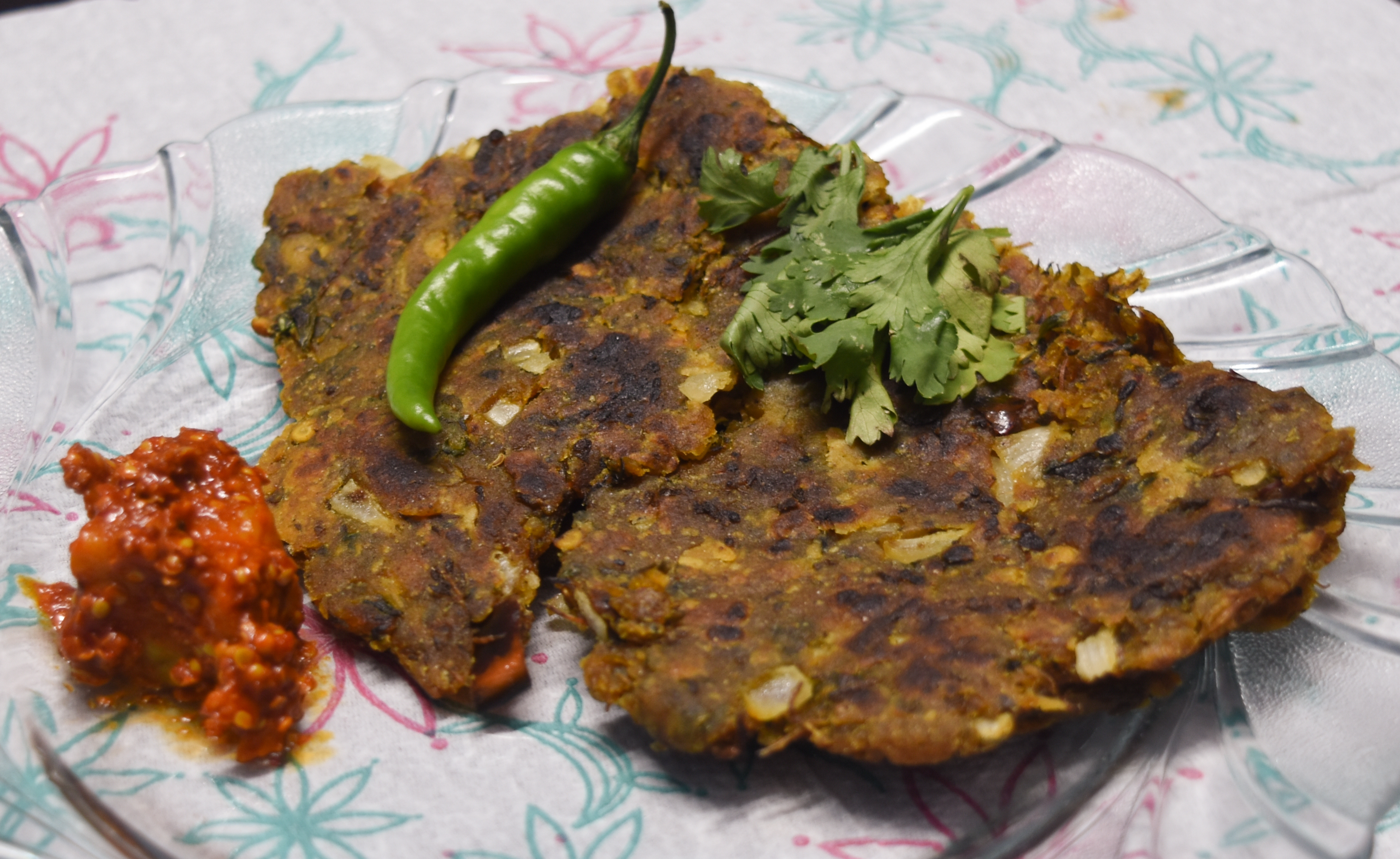
Thalipeeth

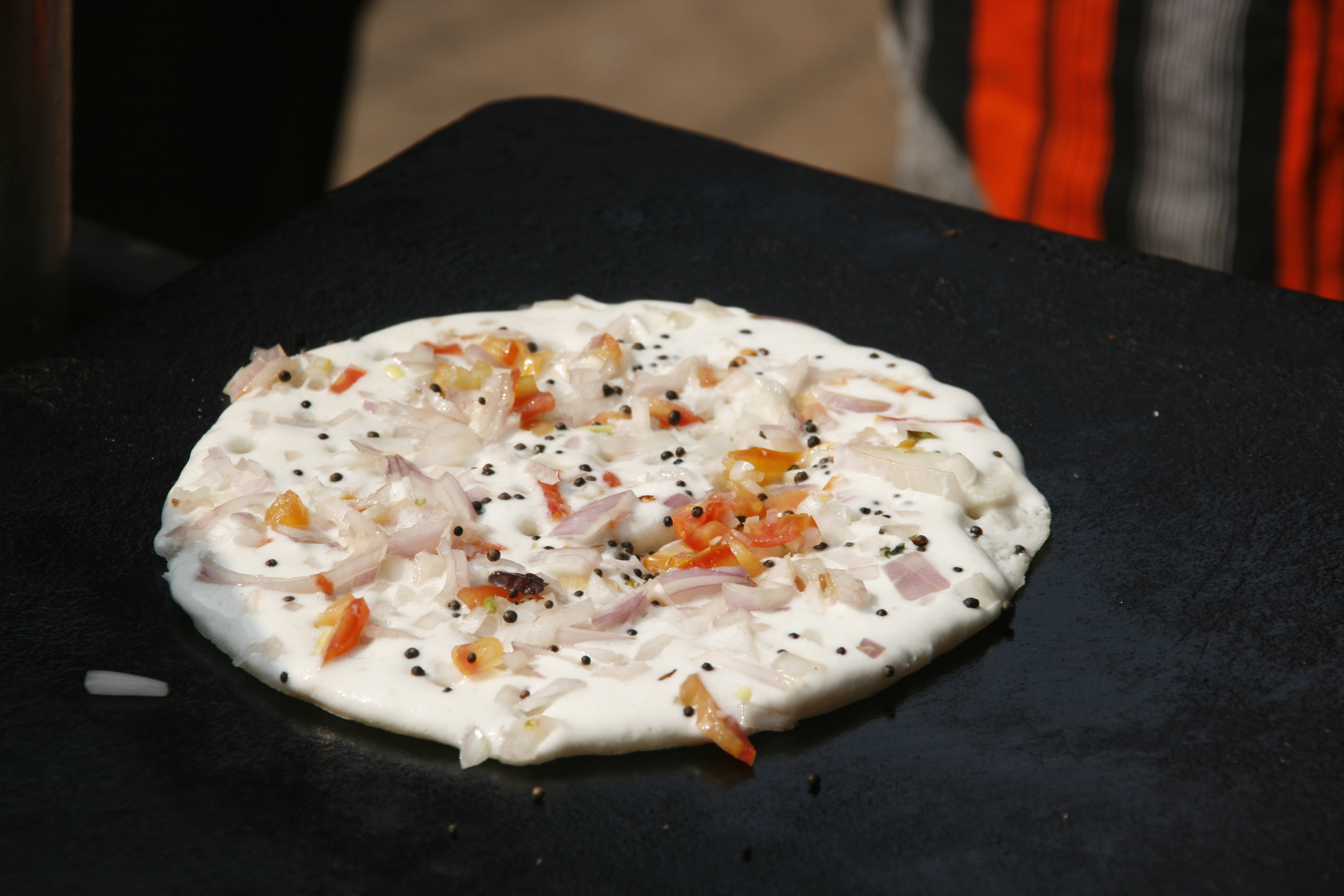
Uttapam as a street food in Varanasi, India

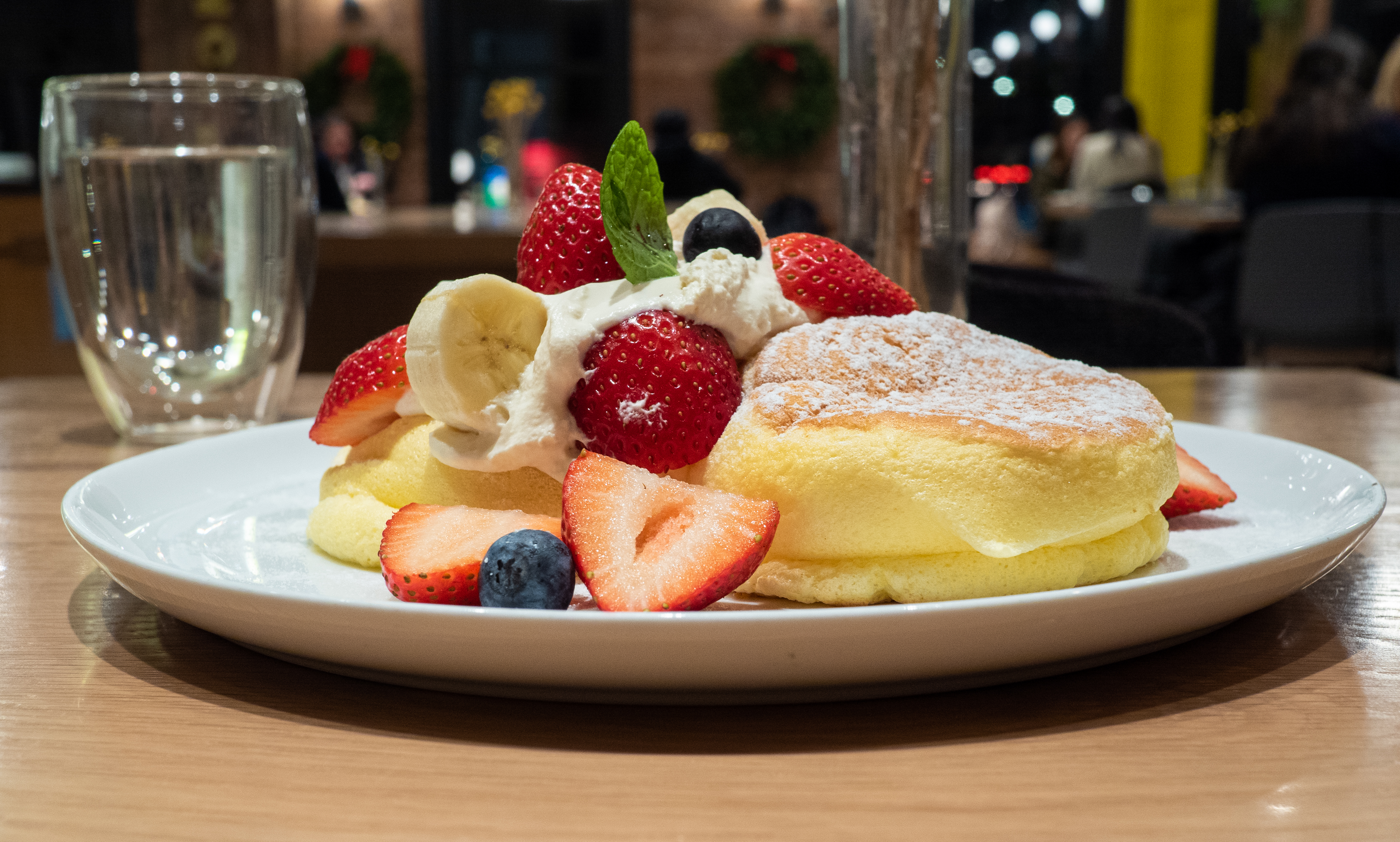
Japanese style souffle pancakes

- Æbleskiver – Danish traditional batter cakes
- Akok – Traditional Malaysian snack
- Ashishim
- Apam balik – Asian pancake
- Appam – Fermented rice pancake from South India and Sri Lanka
- Arepas – South American corn flatbread - fluffy pancakes from Venezuela and Colombia
- Baghrir – Pancake dish in Maghrebi cuisine
- Bánh cuốn – Vietnamese stuffed rice noodles
- Bánh rế – Vietnamese sweet potato pancake
- Bánh xèo – Vietnamese stuffed pancake
- Bein mont – Traditional Burmese snack
- Blini – Russian pancake
- Borlengo – Italian thin flatbread
- Boûkète – Belgian pancake
- Boxty – Traditional Irish potato pancake
- Burgo – Indonesian rice pancake
- Cachapa – Corn pancake from Venezuela
- Chalboribbang – South Korean confection
- Chataamari – Newar cuisine
- Chinese pancake – Chinese flatbread
- Cholermus – Traditional dish from Switzerland
- Cong you bing – Chinese savory flatbread
- Crempog – Welsh pancake served for celebrations
- Crêpe – Thin pancake in French cuisine
  - Crêpe bretonne
  - Crêpe Suzette – French citrus and pancake dessert
  - Palatschinken – Type of pancake
- Crumpet – Small unsweetened griddle bread
- Dadar gulung – Indonesian coconut pancake
- Danbing – Taiwanese egg crêpe
- Daral – Filipino dessert crêpe
- David Eyre's pancake – Pancake originating from the United States
- Dorayaki – Japanese confection
- Dosa – Thin batter bread originating from South India
- Dutch baby pancake – Pancake originating from the United States
- Egg waffle – Hong Kong dish
- Farinata – Chickpea pancake
- Ficelle picarde – French stuffed pancake
- Filloa – Thin round cake made of eggs, milk, and flour
- Flädle – Pancake ribbons added to soup
- Fläskpannkaka – Swedish oven-made pancake
- Funkaso – Hausa dish
- Galette – French flat cake, pancake or pastry
- Gundel pancake – Hungarian pancake
- Guokui – Chinese flatbread
- Gyabrag – Pancake in Tibetan cuisine
- Harcha – Moroccan semolina flatbread
- Hirayachi
- Hortobágyi palacsinta – Hungarian crêpes stuffed with meat
- Hotteok – Korean-Chinese filled pancake dish
- Injera – Fermented flatbread from Ethiopia and Eritrea
- Jemput-jemput – Malaysian and Indonesian fritter
- Jeon – Korean pan-fried dish
  - Bindaetteok – Korean fried mung bean pancake
  - Gamjajeon – Korean potato pancake
  - Hwajeon – Korean pan-fried rice cake
  - Kimchijeon – Kimchi pancake
  - Meat jun – Korean-Hawaiian fusion dish
  - Memiljeon – Korean buckwheat pancake
  - Pajeon – Korean pan-fried scallion dish
- Jianbing – Chinese street food - Chinese pancake
- Johnnycake – American cornmeal flatbread
- Kaiserschmarrn – Sweet pancake dish
- Kalathappam – Indian dessert
- Khanom bueang – Thai pancake
- Khanom krok – Thai dessert cooked in a mortar pan – Thai coconut-rice pancake
- Kouign-amann – Breton baked sweet goods
- Kue ape – Indonesian type of pancake
- Kue cubit – Indonesian traditional cake
- Kue cucur – Indonesian traditional snack
- Laobing – Chinese flatbread
- Latke – Jewish potato pancake dish
- Masala dosa – Variant of South Indian food dosa
- Malawach – Yemenite Jewish flatbread
- Memela – Masa cake in Mexican cuisine
- Milcao – Chilean potato pancake
- Mofletta – Maghrebi Jewish pancake
- Mont lin maya – Crisp, round savory pancake
- Msemen – North African traditional flatbread
- Munini-imo – Pancake made with fermented potato flour
- Murtabak – Stuffed pancake with various fillings
- Neyyappam – South Indian snack
- Okonomiyaki – Japanese savory pancake
- Oladyi – Small, thick pancakes or fritters common in East Slavic cuisine
- Palatschinke – Type of pancake
- Pan bati – Aruban bread
- Pannenkoek – Pancake originating from the Netherlands
- Paniyaram – Indian dish
- Panyalam – Traditional Filipino fried rice pancake
- Pashti – Indian flatbread
- Pathiri – Indian food
- Pek nga – Traditional Malaysian pancake
- Pesaha Appam – Indian rice cake
- Pesarattu – Type of Indian bread
- Pikelet – Thick Australian pancake
- Pinyaram – Minangkabau traditional cake
- Ploye – Brayon flatbread (modern-day Canada)
- Poffertjes – Traditional Dutch batter treat
- Potato pancake – Shallow-fried pancakes of grated or ground potato
- Qatayef – Arab stuffed pancakes
- Quarkkäulchen – German potato pancake dish
- Racuchy – Polish sweet dish
- Rava dosa – Thin batter bread originating from South India
- Roti canai – Indian-influenced flatbread dish in Southeast Asia
- Roti prata – Indian-influenced flatbread dish in Southeast Asia
- Roti Jala – Southeast Asian pancake
- Salukara – Pancake from Filipino cuisine
- Scallion pancake – Chinese savory flatbread – also referred to as spring onion pancake
- Scovardă – Romanian pastry
- Sel roti – Nepalese sweet rice bread
- Serabi – Indonesian type of pancake
- Spring pancake – Chinese dish
- Staffordshire oatcake – Savoury pancake from England
- Suncake – Taiwanese flaky cakes filled with maltose
- Surnoli – Sweet Indian pancake
- Swedish pancake – Thin round cake made of eggs, milk, and flour
- Syrniki – Fried quark pancakes from Eastern European cuisine
- Tattie scone – Scottish potato dish
- Thalipeeth – Indian flatbread
- Tortilla – Round unleavened flatbread made of either nixtamlized corn or wheat
- Tlacoyo – Mexican dish
- Touton – Newfoundland pancake
- Uttapam – Type of dosa from South India
- Wheel Pie – Taiwanese pastry dessert
- Wild rice pancake – Type of American food

== See also ==
- Pearl Milling Company – brand of pancake mix, syrup, and other breakfast foods
- Crepe maker
- List of bread dishes
- List of quick breads
- Lists of prepared foods
- List of toast dishes
- Pancake breakfast
- Pancake pen
