= Saxon cuisine =

Culinary traditions of Saxony, Germany

Saxon cuisine encompasses regional cooking traditions of Saxony. In general the cuisine is very hearty and features many peculiarities of Mid-Germany such as a great variety of sauces which accompany the main dish and the fashion to serve Klöße/Knödel as a side dish instead of potatoes, pasta or rice. Also much freshwater fish is used in Saxon cuisine, particularly carp and trout as is the case throughout Eastern Europe.

The rich history of the region did and still does influence the cuisine. In the blossoming and growing cities of Dresden and Leipzig an extravagant style of cuisine is cherished as exemplified by crab as an ingredient in Leipziger Allerlei. Other regions where the people had to work really hard to yield some harvest and were really poor like in the Ore Mountains peasant dishes play a major role and famous dishes originating there are e.g. potatoes with quark, potato soup or potato with bread and linseed oil. Also in the region Vogtland there were many peasants but they were wealthier and that's why in this region the Sunday roast is a tradition that is nowadays still lived up to.

== Beer in Saxony ==
Throughout Saxony there are brewery traditions and traditional beers. Many famous varieties are brewed there, such as Freiberger, Radeberger, and Wernesgrüner, which was especially in the time of the GDR frequently exported.

== Desserts and sweets ==
The baking goods and pastries of the cuisine of Saxony are known to be varied and unique. The German tradition of Kaffee und Kuchen (lit. coffee and cake), Gaffee un Guchn in the Upper Saxon dialect, originates in Saxony and the Saxons were the first to serve cake with their coffee. This distinction can be seen in the expressions Kaffeesachse and Kaffeetante (which conveys the idea that 'aunties' (Tanten) or old women would meet to gossip over a cup of coffee). This custom, which shows the cultural relations to the cuisine of Austria, and that of Bohemia, is still followed today. No other region in Germany has such a distinct and rich café-culture as Saxony. This can be seen in the many old, grandiose coffeehouses in Leipzig, where the first German café was opened, and in Dresden.

== Nationwide famous dishes ==
- Eierschecke
- Blinsen (a kind of pancake)
- Quarkkäulchen
- Klitscher (a variety of potato pancake)
- Kalter Hund
- Leipziger Allerlei
- Saure Flecke
- Wickelkloß
- Dresdner Stollen
- Pulsnitzer Pfefferkuchen (a kind of gingerbread)
- Sächsischer Sauerbraten
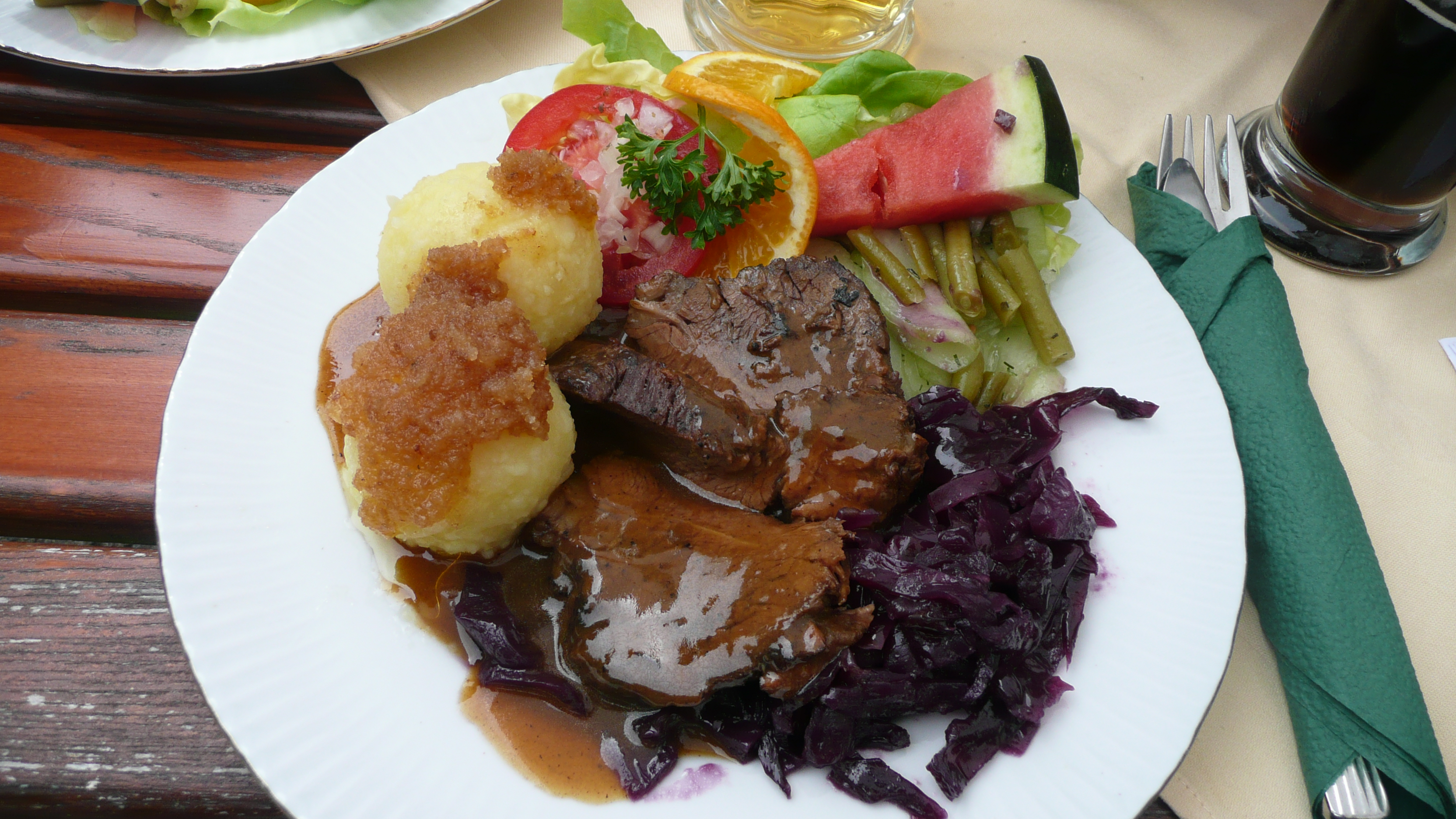
Sächsischer Sauerbraten

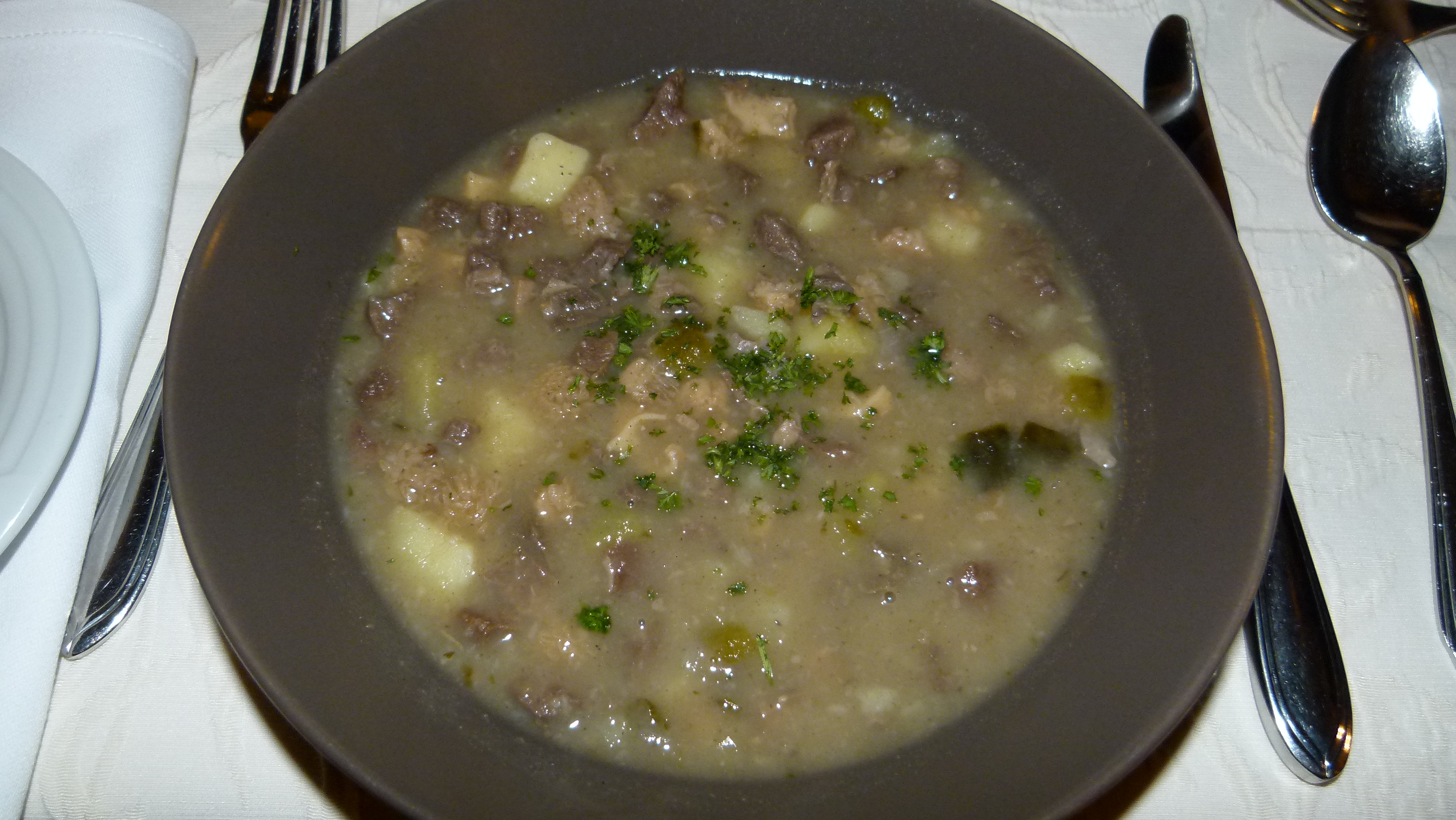
Sächsische Flecke

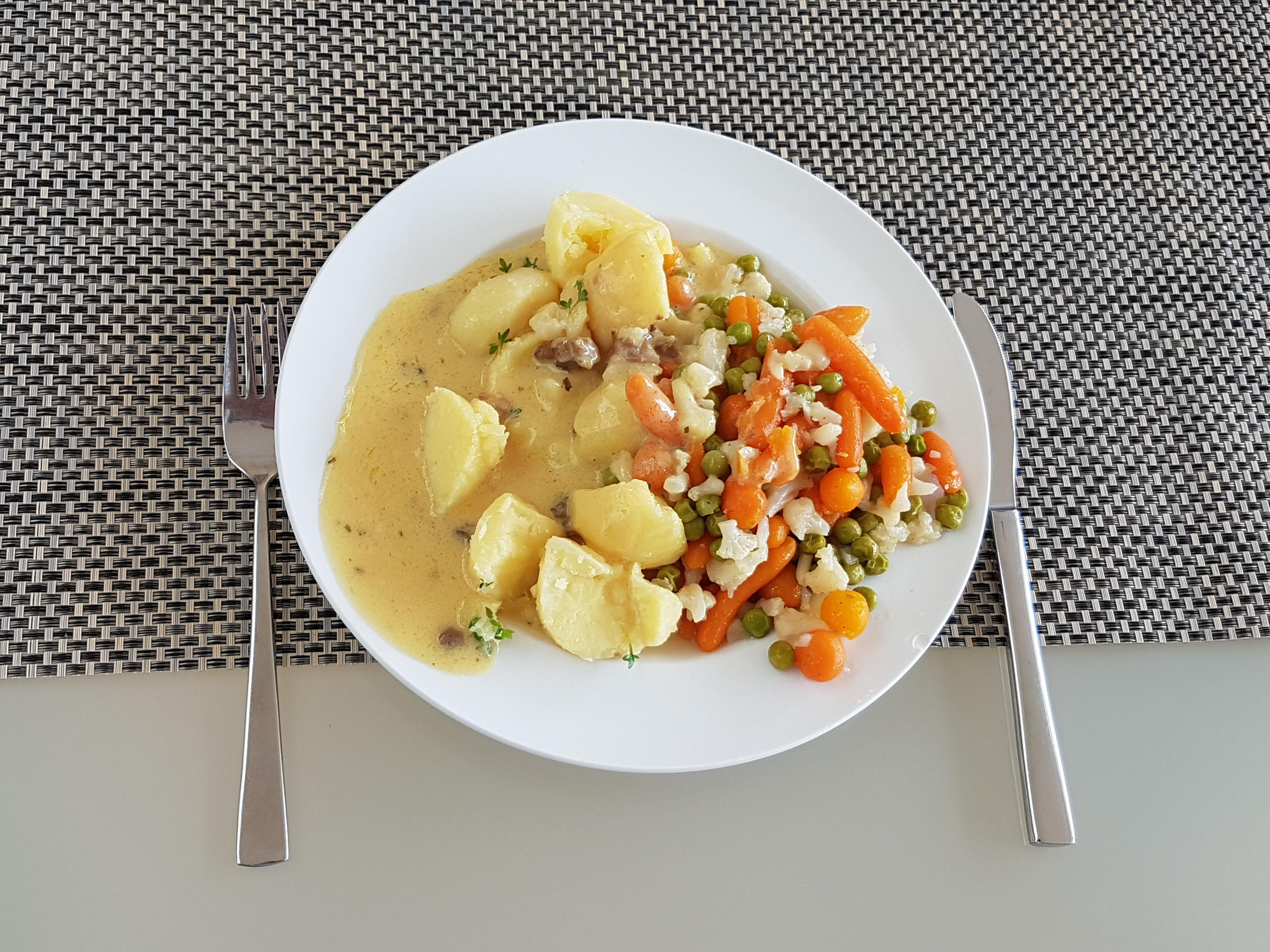
Leipziger Allerlei

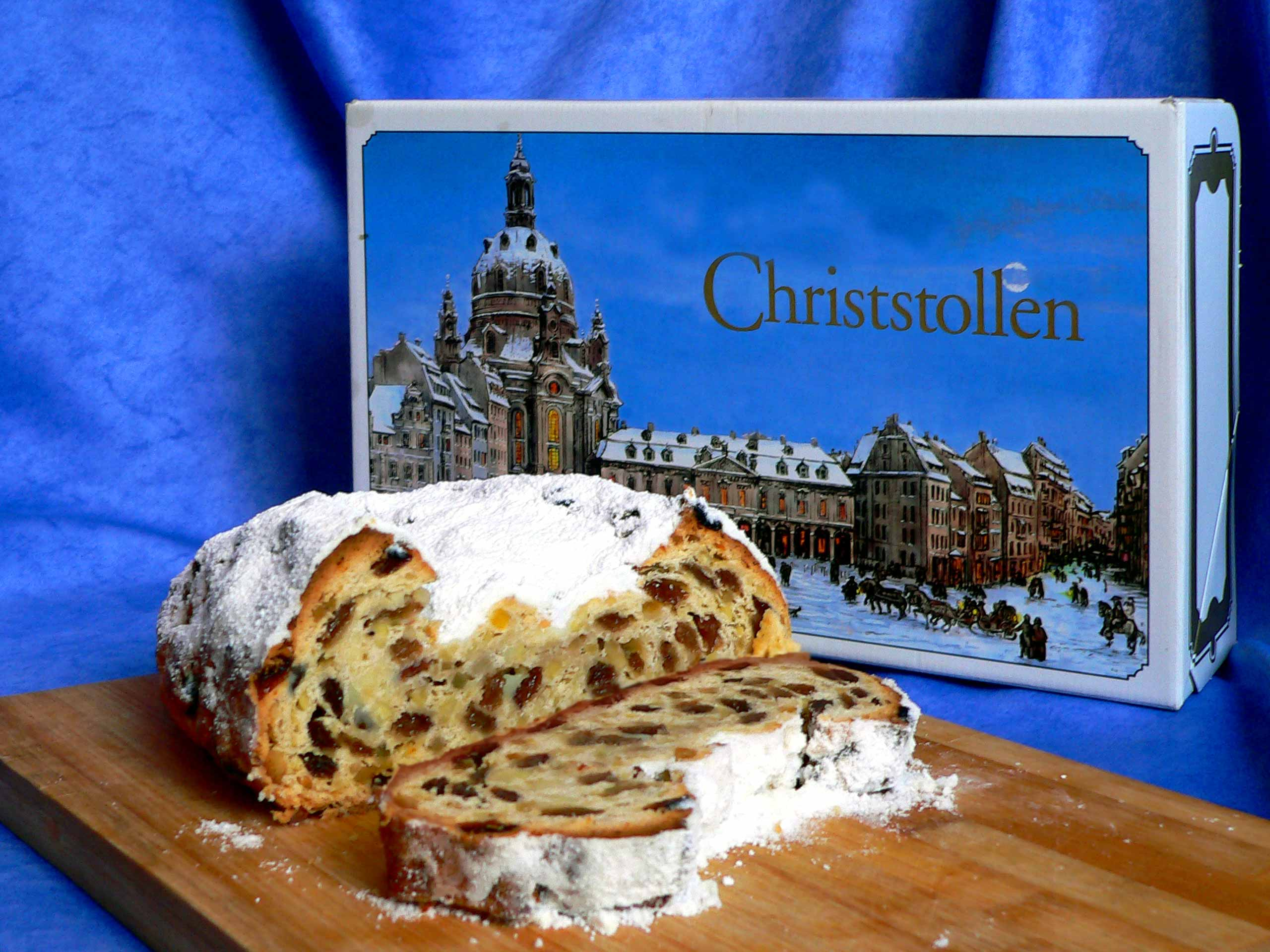
Dresdner Christstollen

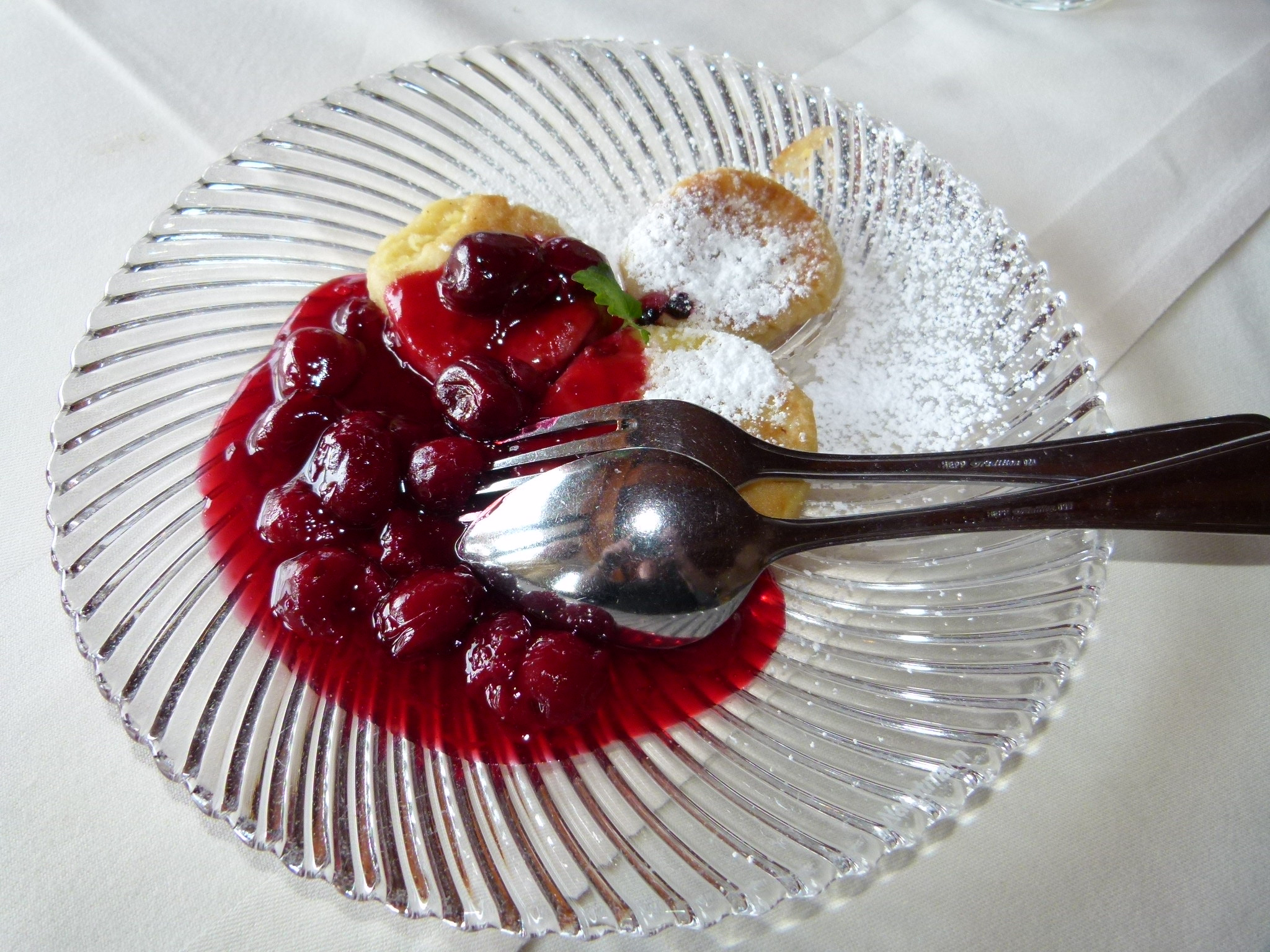
Quarkkäulchen

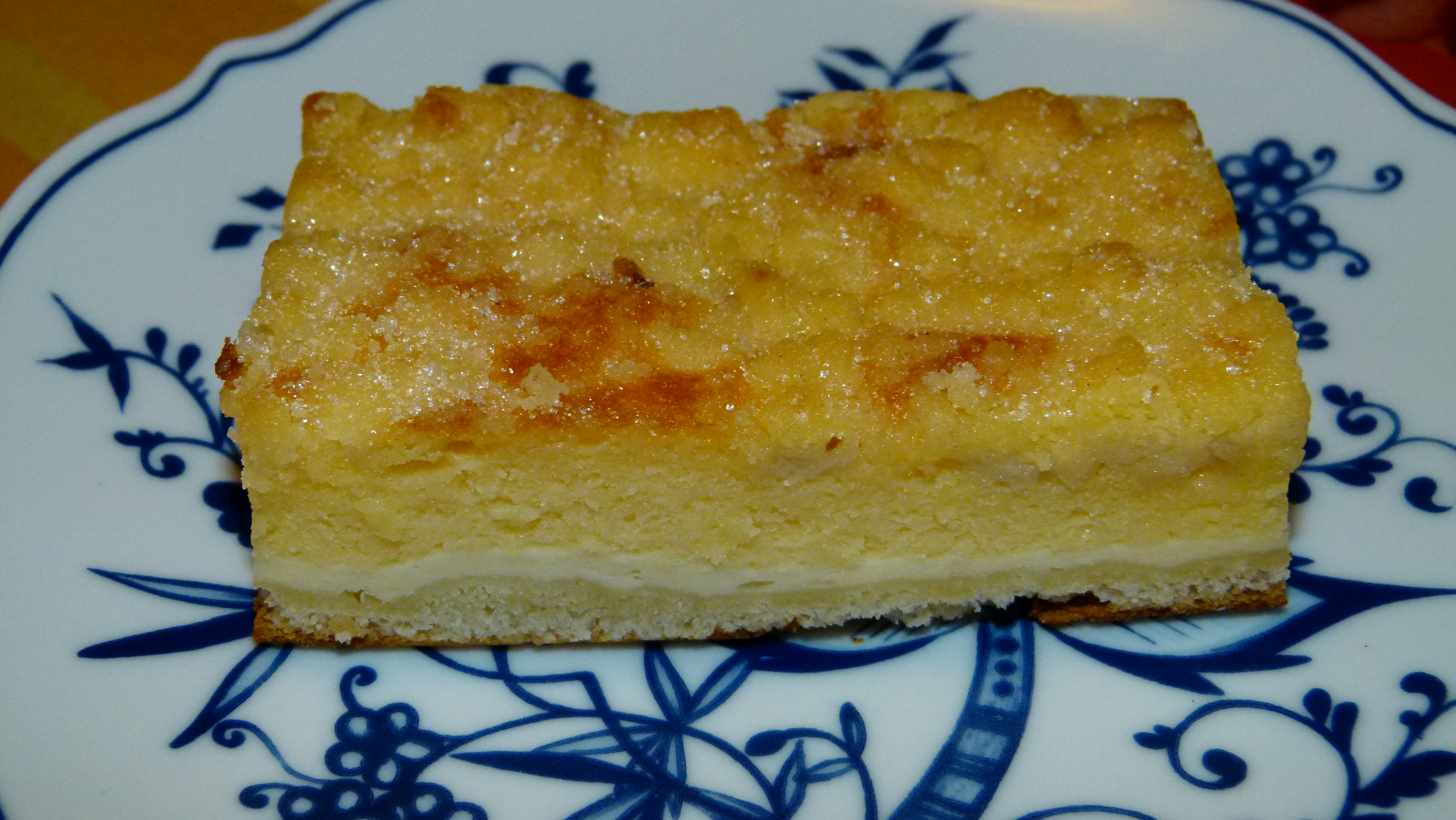
Eierschecke

== Literature ==
- Jürgen Helfricht: Sächsisches Spezialitäten-Backbuch: Schlemmer-Rezepte von Dr. Quendt. 4. Auflage, Husum Verlag, Husum 2009, ISBN 978-3-89876-230-4.
- Thomas Schaufuß: Sächsische Tischkultur und Lebensart, Dresden, Leipzig, Verlag Edition Limosa, 2013, ISBN 978-3860375129.
