= Stegt flæsk =

Danish pork dish

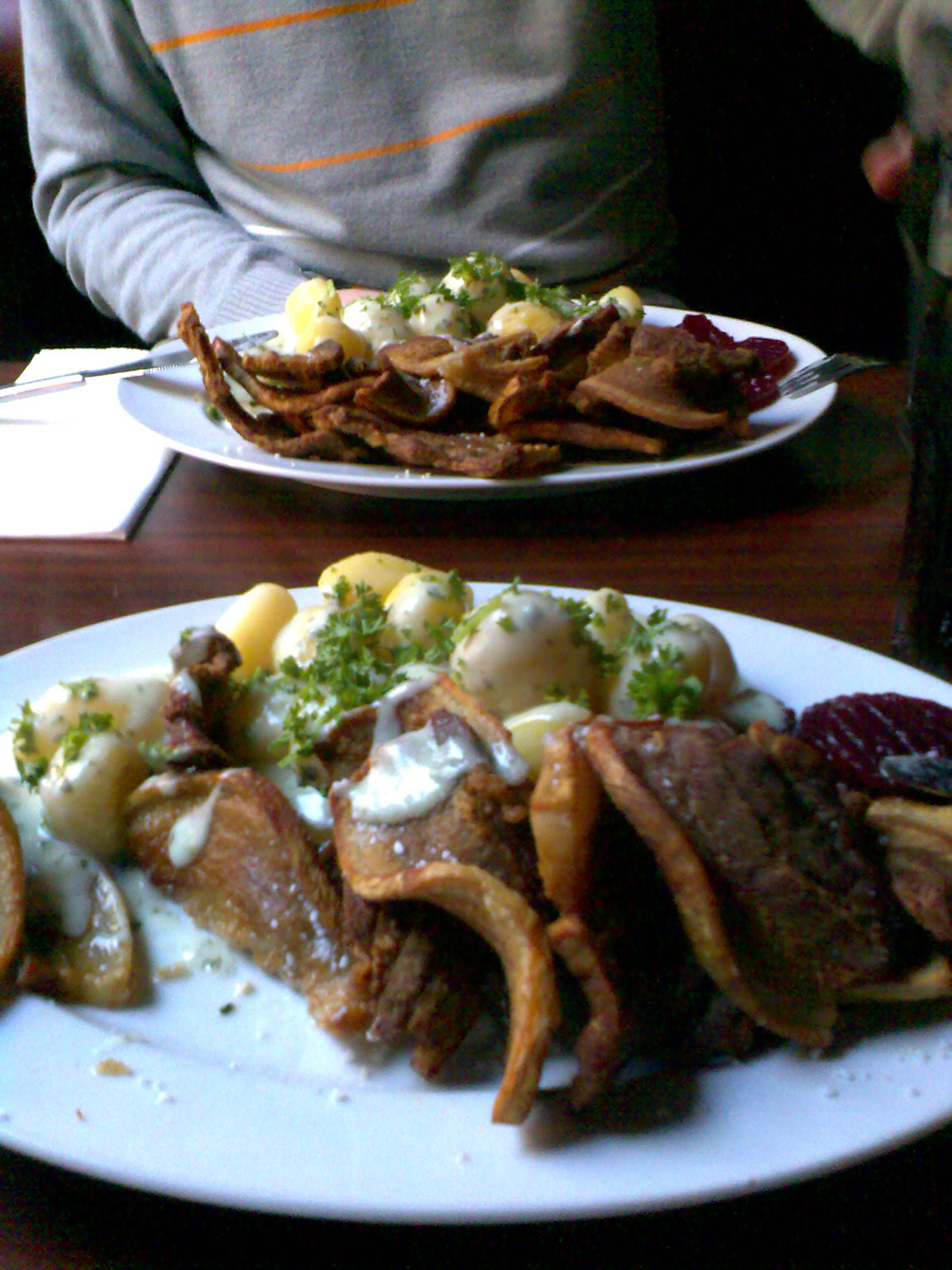
- Place of origin: Scandinavia
- Main ingredients: Potatoes, pork

Stegt flæsk (Danish: [ˈstekt ˈflesk]) is a dish from Scandinavia consisting of fried pork belly and generally served with potatoes and parsley sauce (persillesovs). The dish is sometimes translated as 'pork strips' or 'crisp fried pork slices'. The pork belly or "breast" cut of a pig is used for stegt flæsk and the strips are cut about 1/4 inch thick.

== In Danish cuisine ==
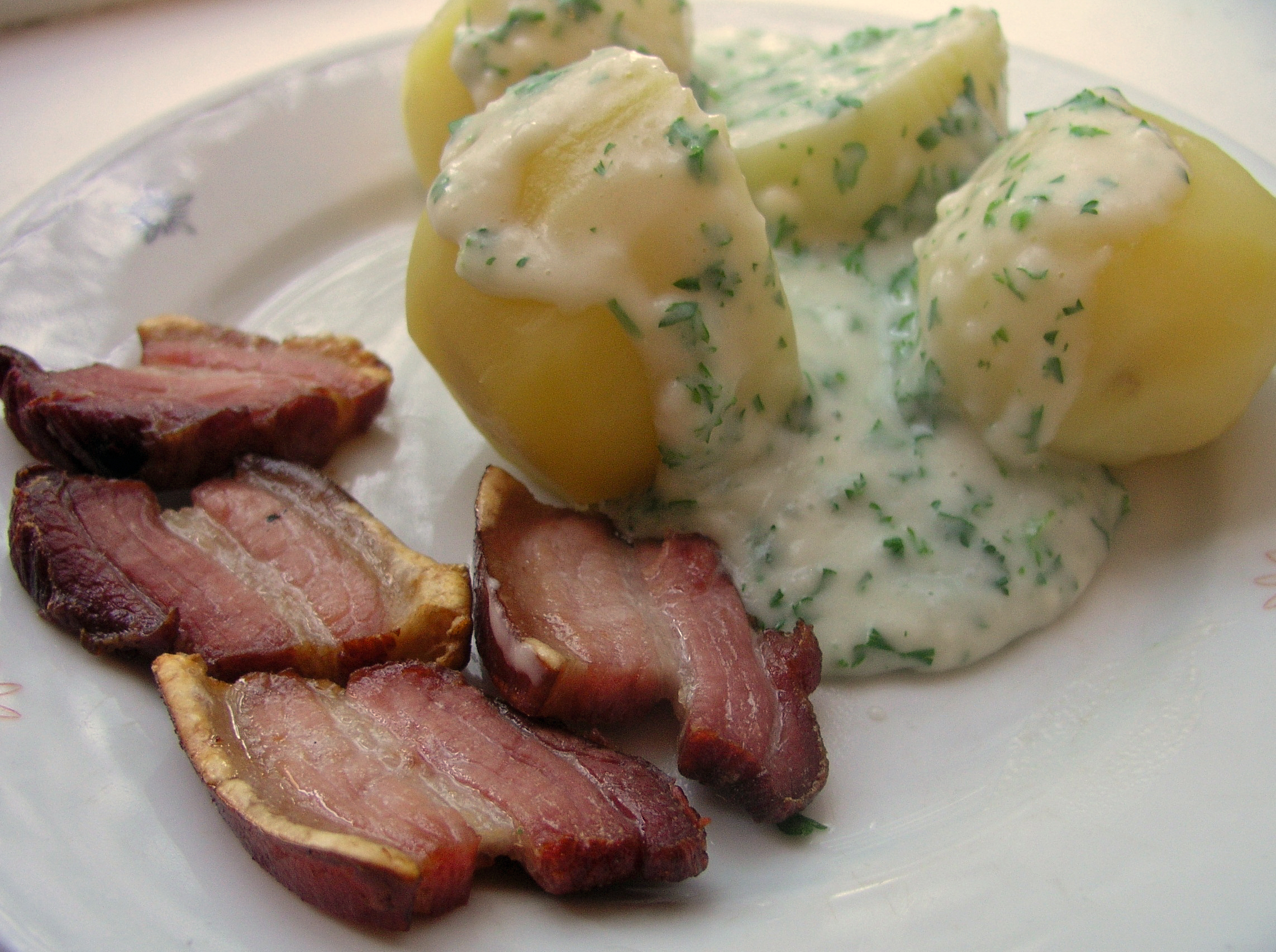
Stegt flæsk with potatoes in parsley sauce

Stegt flæsk is the national dish of Denmark and one of the country's most popular foodstuffs and has been described as "a dish of pork fat, and only pork fat, in parsley sauce." An "alternative guide to Denmark" from the British broadcaster BBC described stegt flæsk med persillesovs as fried slices of pork with fat served with parsley sauce and boiled potatoes.

Stegt means 'fried' and flæsk means 'strips of pork belly'. It is lightly salted but not smoked. Stegt flæsk is included in The Art of Danish Cooking by Nika Standen Hazelton and Scandinavian Cooking by Elizabeth Craig where the dish is translated as "bacon with parsley sauce" Flæsk is also translated as 'bacon' in older language guides. The main difference between bacon and flæsk is that flæsk is never sold smoked, and often not salted either. By contrast, anything marketed as 'bacon' in Denmark invariably will be both smoked and salted.

The dish is especially popular at certain times of the year. Since the 2000s a tradition has emerged of eating stegt flæsk on election nights as a pun on the derogatory term valgflæsk (election pork) used to describe the lofty promises politicians make during their campaigns. Stegt flæsk can also be served with apple compote.

Pork is the most popular meat in Denmark and bacon and cuts of pork are used in many dishes in traditional Danish cuisine. Flæskesteg is roast pork with cracklings, usually served with rødkål red cabbage, gravy and boiled potatoes. Flæskeæggekage consists of a large pan of scrambled eggs with stegt flæsk, chives, tomatoes and rugbrød ryebread on the side. Leverpostej is a liver pate of pork liver, served both hot and cold in a variety of ways. Stegt medister is a thick, metre-long, spiced, minced pork sausage with lard and chopped onion, pan fried and served in a variety of ways. The BBC noted that whilst Danish food is not limited to just pork meat and pastries, "it would be fair to say they feature heavily in the diets of Denmark's citizens". An instructional video for cooking stegt flæsk on a ceramic grill was featured on Japanese KamadoTV.

== In Danish culture ==
Jimi and René, a musical duo from Denmark, recorded a song on their Volume Four To Som Os album called "stegt flæsk med persillesovs". Tobias Trier, a Danish singer-songwriter, has also sung about the dish. KiMs, a leading Danish potato chips producer, even made a stegt flæsk-flavoured potato chip (now discontinued).

== See also ==
- Danish cuisine
- Norwegian cuisine
- Bacon and cabbage
- Fläskpannkaka
- List of pork dishes
- List of meat and potato dishes
