= Danbing =

Taiwanese egg crêpe

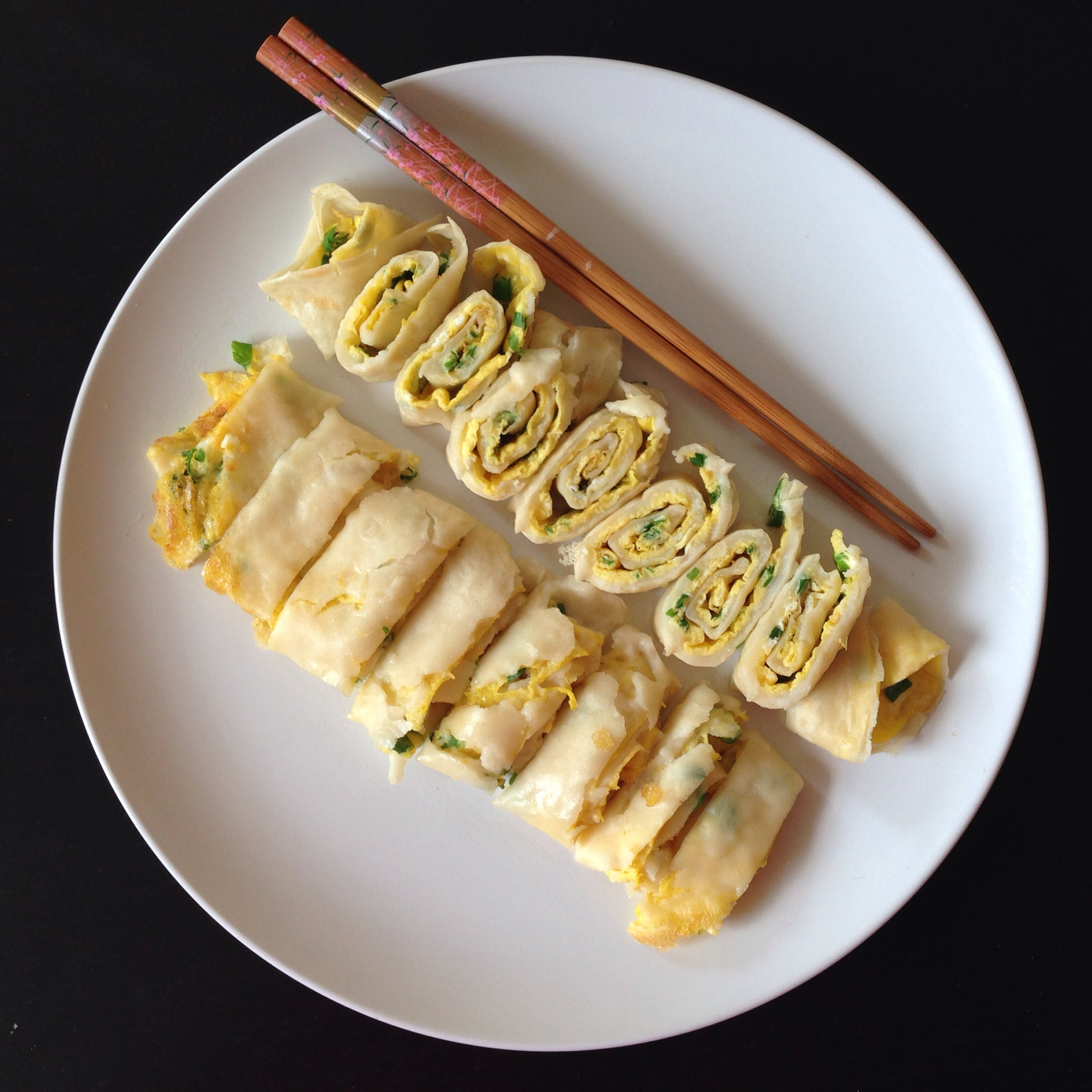
- Alternative names: Egg pancake
- Type: Pancake
- Place of origin: Taiwan
- Main ingredients: Dough, eggs

Danbing
- Traditional Chinese: 蛋餅
- Simplified Chinese: 蛋饼
- Literal meaning: egg pancake
Transcriptions
Standard Mandarin
- Hanyu Pinyin: dàn bǐng
Southern Min
- Hokkien POJ: nn̄g-piánn

Danbing (traditional Chinese: 蛋餅; simplified Chinese: 蛋饼; pinyin: dàn bǐng; Pe̍h-ōe-jī: nn̄g-piánn; lit. 'egg pancake'; Mandarin pronunciation [tânpìŋ]), also known as egg pancake or rolled egg crepe, is a Taiwanese breakfast dish. Different regions make the dish differently, in most cases, the dough is made by kneading flour, potato starch, glutinous rice flour, and water into a thin dough, and an omelet is baked on top of the dough. In Taiwan, dan bing is mainly sold at breakfast shops, restaurants as well as night market food stalls. They are also sold commercially in supermarkets, where the dough is frozen in plastic packaging, and egg is added as the dough is heated.

At first, eggs were added to scallion pancakes. Later, a no-knead flour batter version appeared, which was made of flour, cornstarch and sweet potato flour. In 1994, mass-produced omelet crust appeared in the factory, which promoted the popularity of omelet pancakes. The taste is different from that of scallion pancakes, which are lighter and more flexible.

== History ==
Like many other Taiwanese dishes, the original version of the danbing came from mainland China with the Kuomintang after the Chinese Civil War ended in 1949. However, gradually over time, the dish has been modified to suit the taste of local Taiwanese people and has since become a unique Taiwanese breakfast dish and an icon of Taiwanese cuisine. One distinctive change made to the original recipe is that sweet potato powder is mixed into the dough to give it a unique, chewier texture known as Q in Taiwan. This became the staple of the Taiwanese danbing, but the different textures were preferred in northern and southern Taiwan. In northern Taiwan, the dough is fried with strong fire, giving it a crispy texture. On the contrary, the soft and chewy texture is emphasized in the south, and the seasoning is slightly sweeter. The dish has recently gained popularity in the United States.

== Variations and accompaniments ==
Variations exist on the basic method of preparation that incorporate other flavours and fillings. Other ingredients, such as tuna chunks and minced pork, are sometimes added with the egg. Vegetarian danbing can include corn added with the egg. In Taiwan, the pancakes are often served with soy sauce or sweet chili sauce.

== Gallery ==
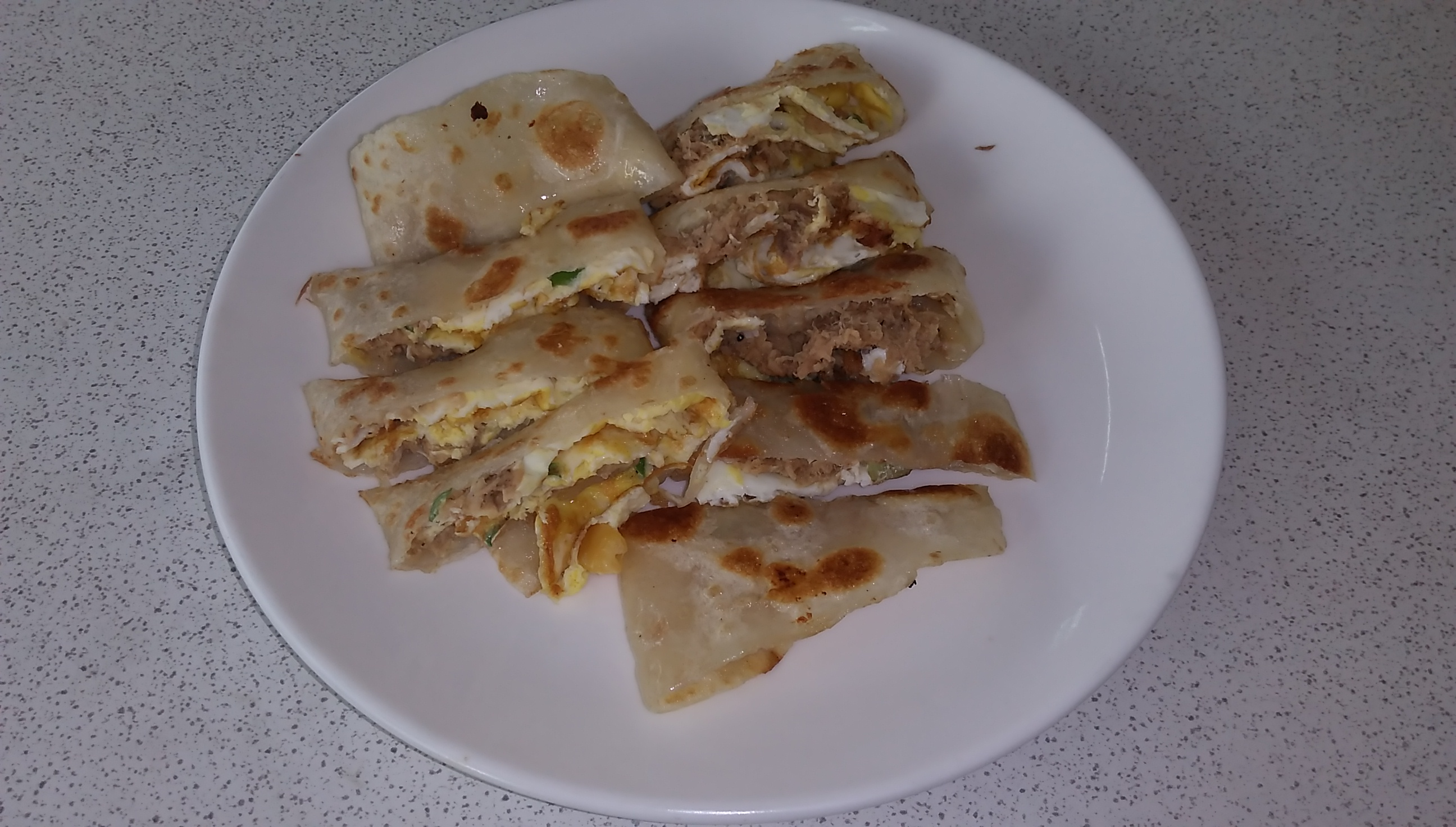
A street food-style danbing with tuna fillings

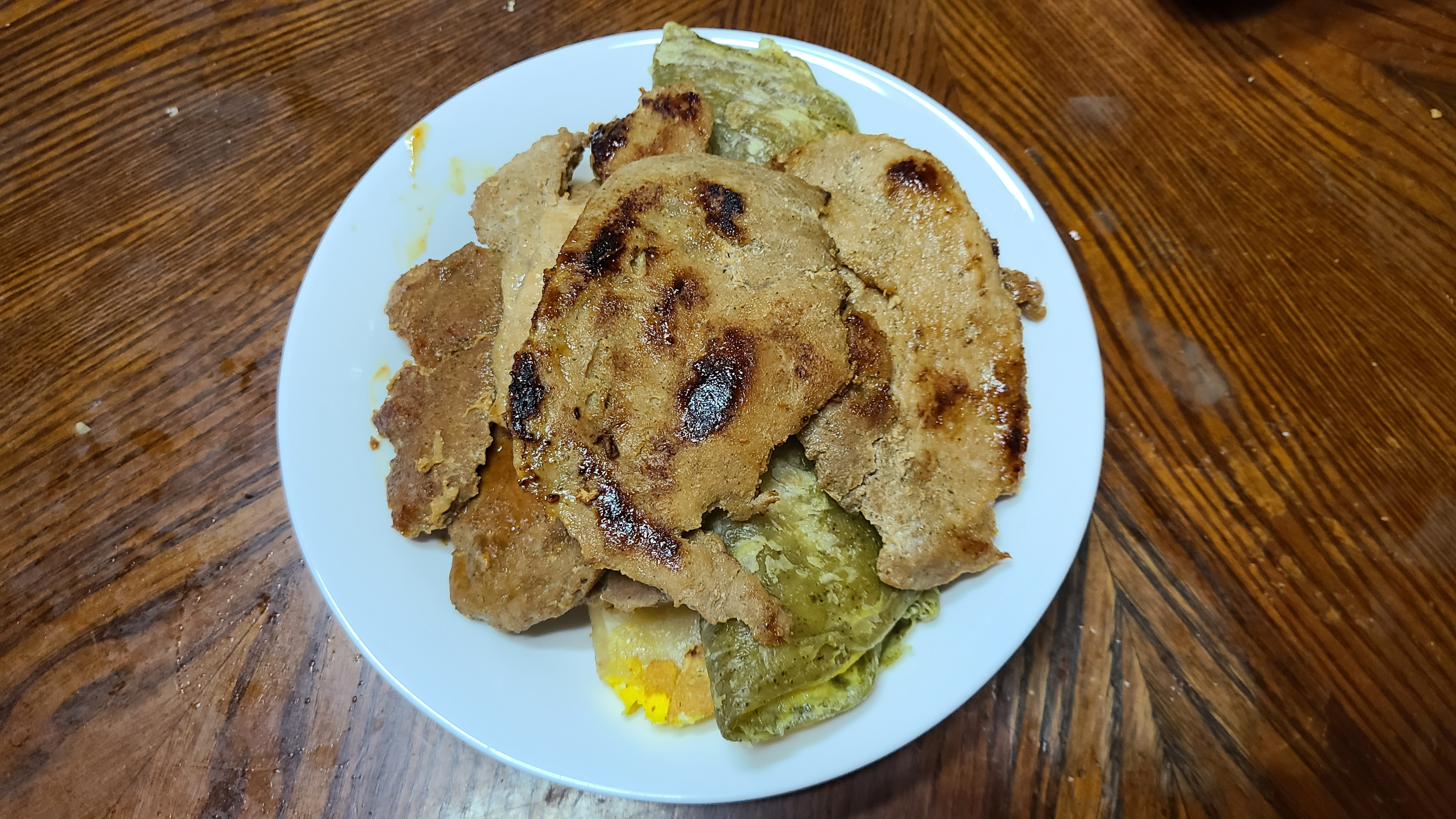
Danbing with pork fillings

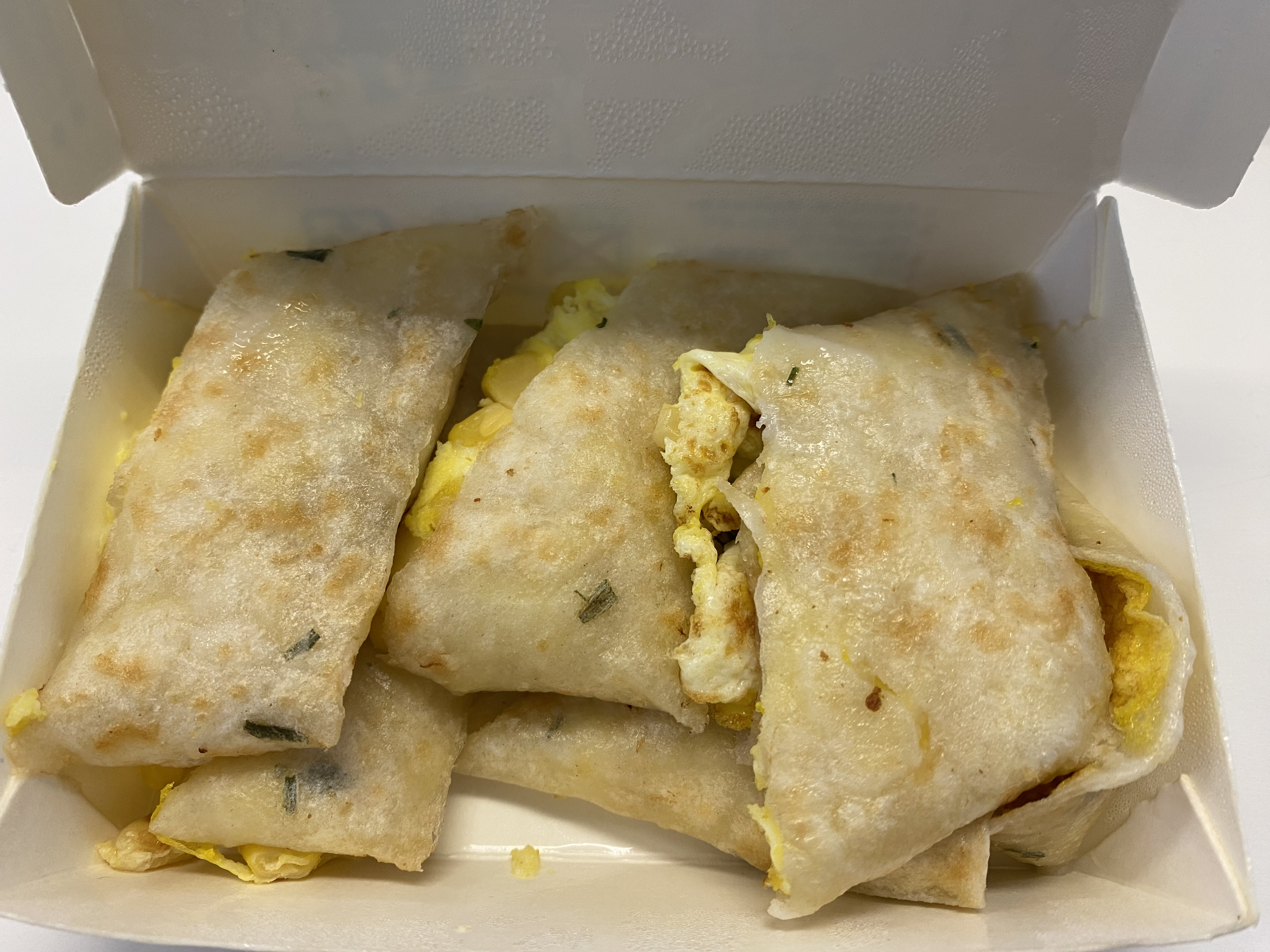
Danbing with corn fillings

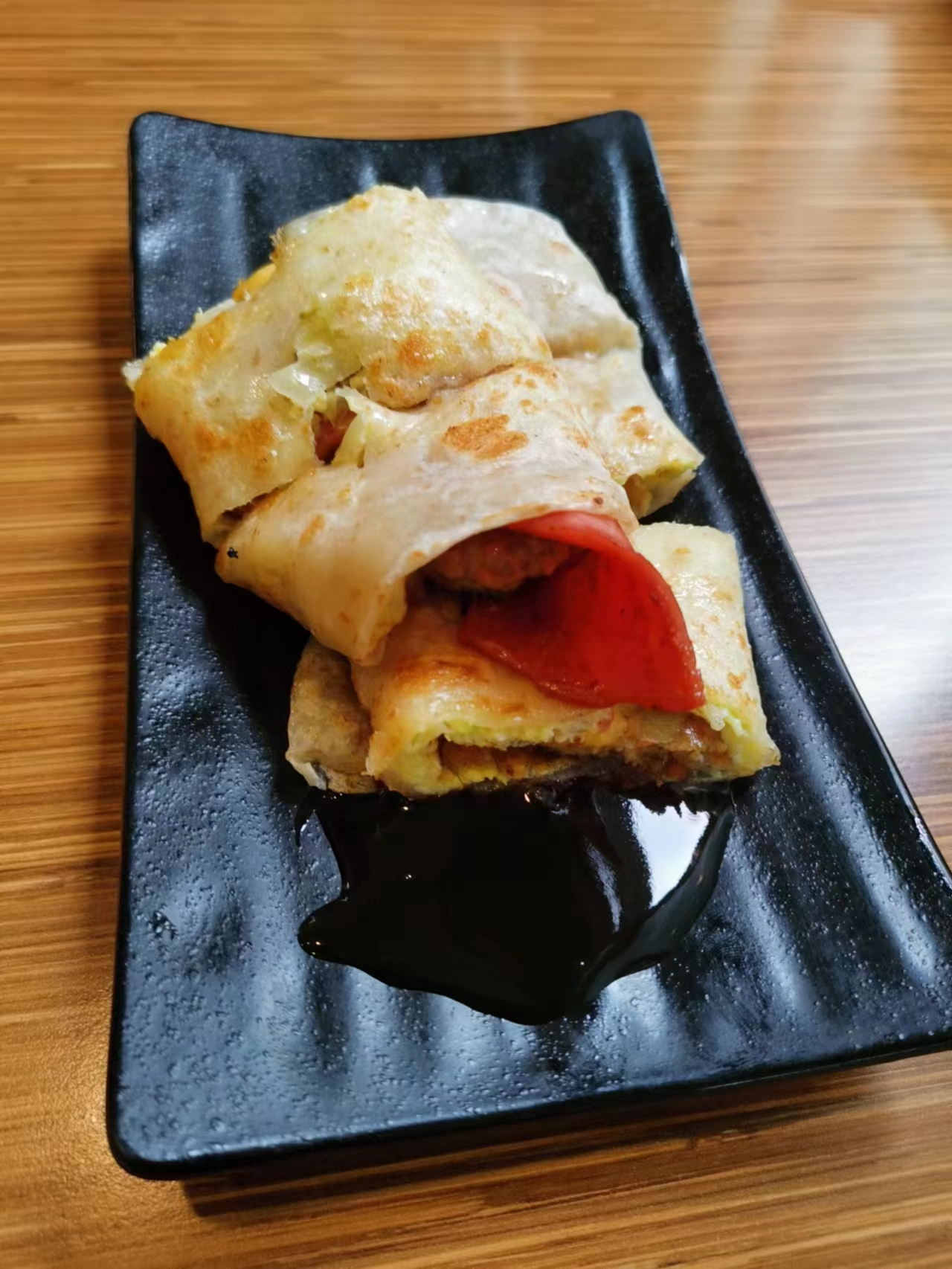

== See also ==
- Taiwanese cuisine
- List of egg dishes
- List of pancakes
