= Cholermus =

Traditional dish from Switzerland

- Alternative names: Swiss pancake
- Type: Pancake
- Course: Supper, breakfast
- Place of origin: Switzerland

Cholermues or cholermüs is a traditional dish from the Canton of Obwalden in Central Switzerland. It is a kind of pancake, or "shredded, fried crepe", that is typically eaten for supper.

This preparation should not be confused with hollermus (or holdermus), which is an elderberry mash.

== See also ==
- List of pancakes
