= Gundel pancake =

Hungarian pancake

Gundel Crêpe
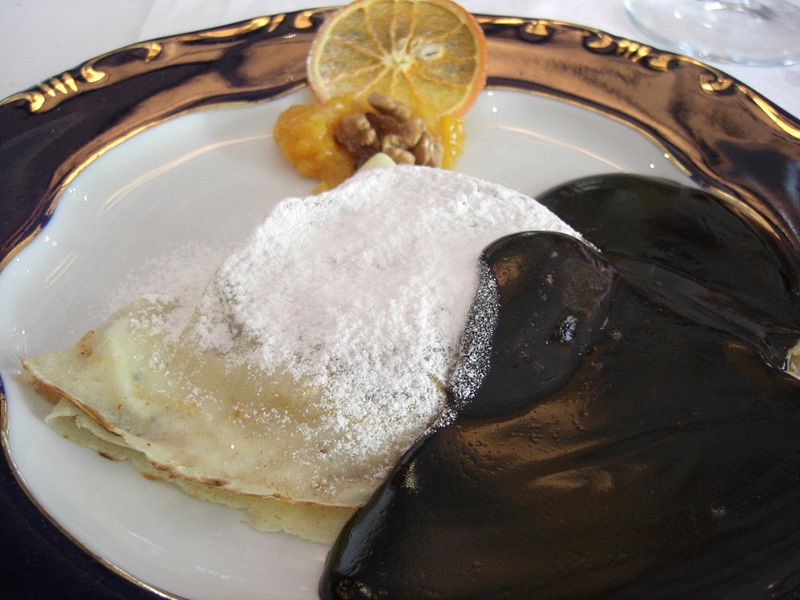
- Gundel Palacsinta filled with walnuts and chocolate sauce
- Type: Pancake
- Course: Dessert
- Place of origin: Hungary
- Created by: Károly Gundel
- Main ingredients: Walnuts, raisins, rum, dark chocolate sauce (egg yolks, heavy cream, cocoa)

A Gundel crêpe (original Gundel palacsinta) is a crêpe-like variety of pancake from Hungary.

== Overview ==
The first Gundel crêpe was created and invented by Károly Gundel, who made the pancake with ground walnuts, raisins, and rum filling, served flambéed in a dark chocolate sauce made with egg yolks, heavy cream and cocoa. The original recipe is secret; only the Gundel restaurant knows it. The restaurant serves 25,000 portions to their guests annually.

=== Austria ===
The dessert is well known in Austrian cuisine. They recommend this pancake sometimes as chocolate-walnut palatschinke or walnut palatschinke in Austria. It is usually served with whipped cream and normally does not contain raisins. The Hotel Sacher presents it based on the original prescription, with caramelized walnut.

== See also ==
- Palatschinke
- List of pancakes
