= Pan bati =

Aruban bread

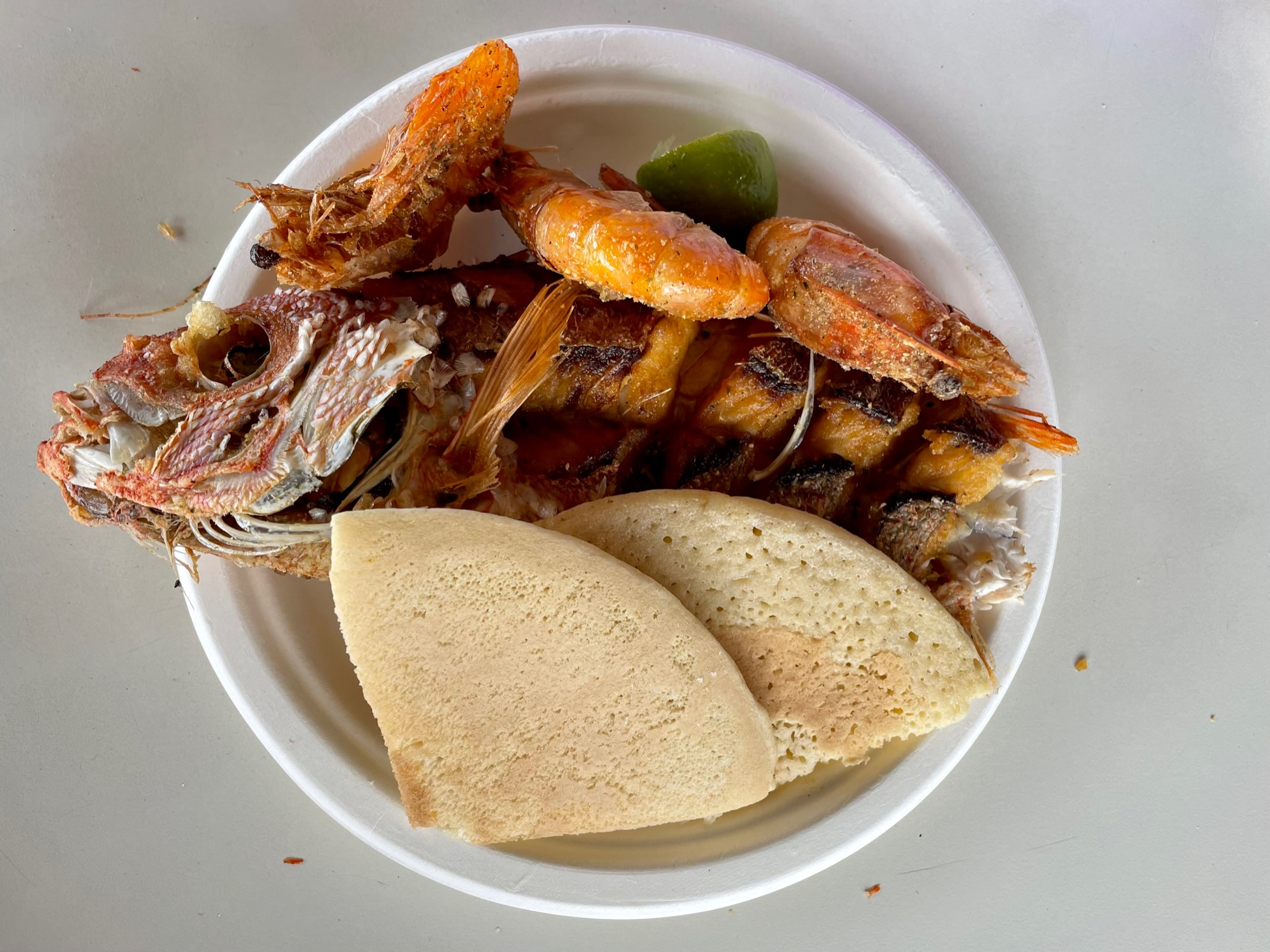
- Type: bread
- Course: Part of a main dish
- Place of origin: Aruba
- Main ingredients: Sorghum flour, wheat flour and milk

Pan bati (lit. 'beaten bread') is a bread that is made in Aruba. The literal translation is "smashed bread" because it is so flat. It contains sorghum flour, wheat flour and milk.

In Aruba it is eaten as bread, but also as a pancake with sugar on it or with other fillings.

The creation of pan bati has been influenced by different cultures such as that of the Spanish conquerors and that of the natives, the Indians. But the biggest influence came from the Creole culture.
