= Munini-imo =

Pancake made with fermented potato flour

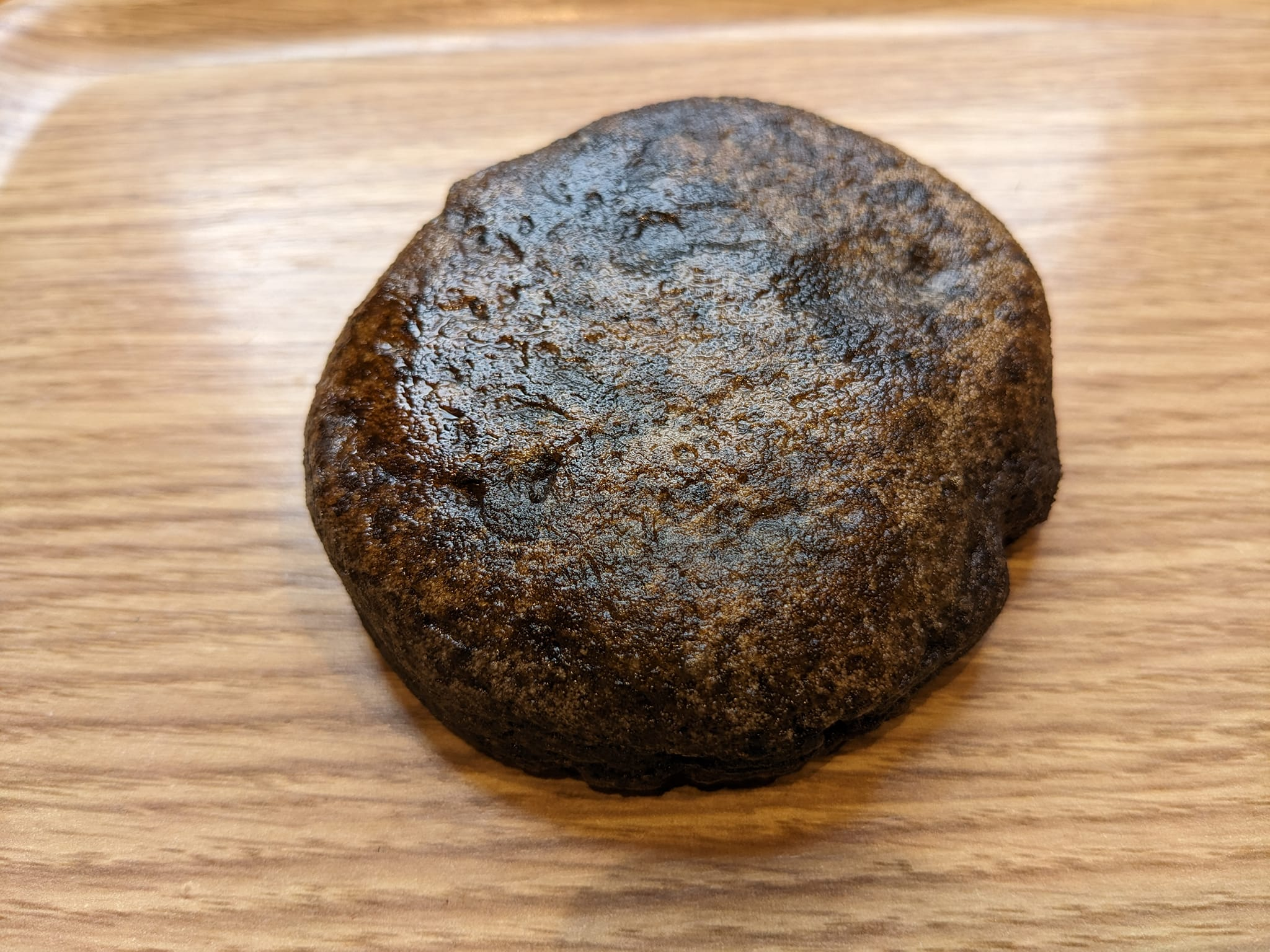
- Munini-imo potato preserved food
- Type: Pancake
- Place of origin: Japan
- Main ingredients: Potato flour

Munini-imo (or muninimo, from Ainu munin ["fermented"] and Japanese imo ["potatoes"]) is a dish of the Ainu people of Northern Japan. It is a savory pancake made with potato flour.

Potatoes are first fermented underground by repeated freeze-thaw cycles, and then milled and dried. The flour is soaked in water in order to remove the bitter taste and then baked on a griddle like a thick pancake. The potato flour made with this process can be easily stored for at least twenty years. The munini-imo is very sticky like mochi.
