= Pancake art =

Pictures made from pancake batter

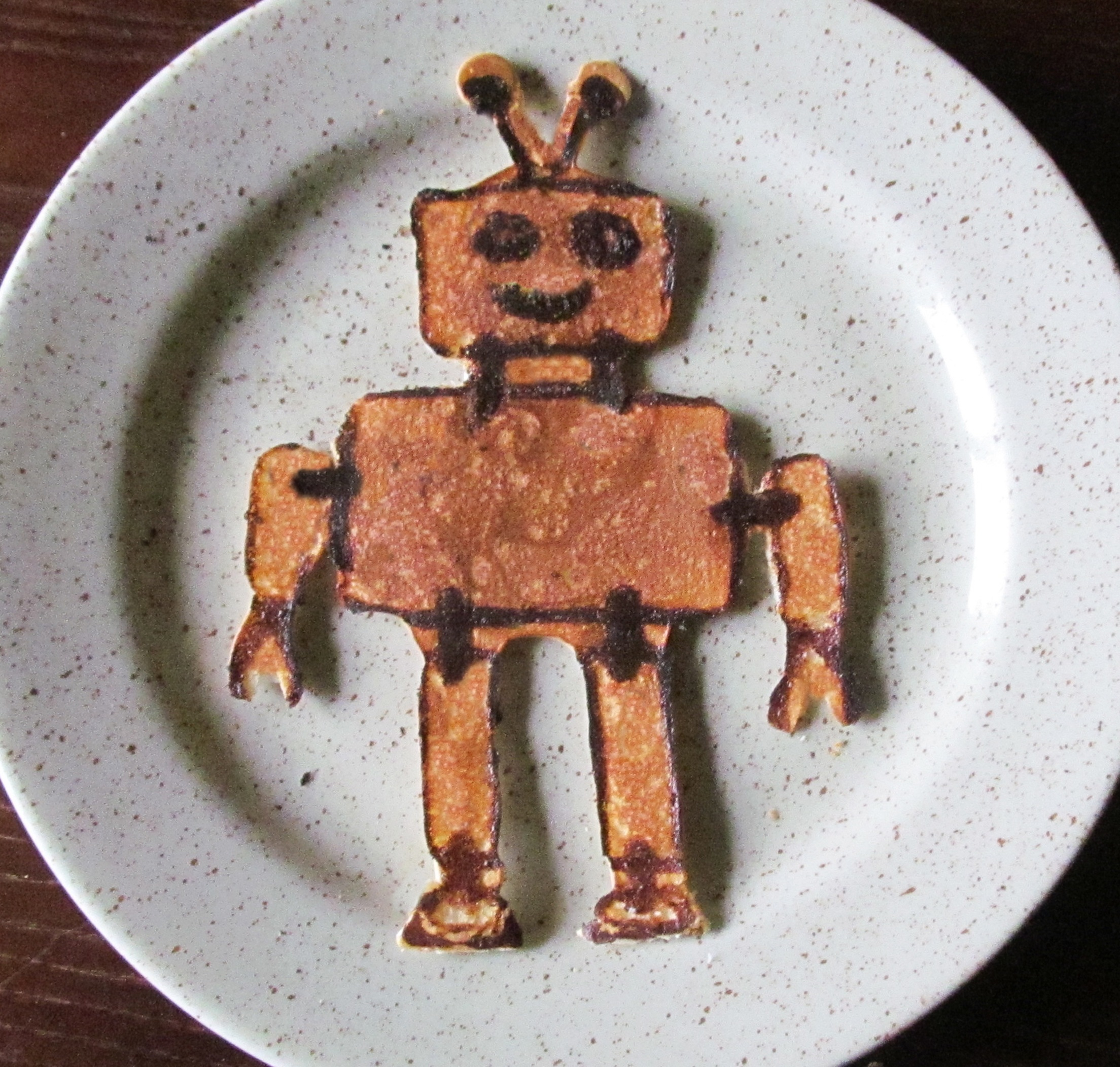
A robot pancake

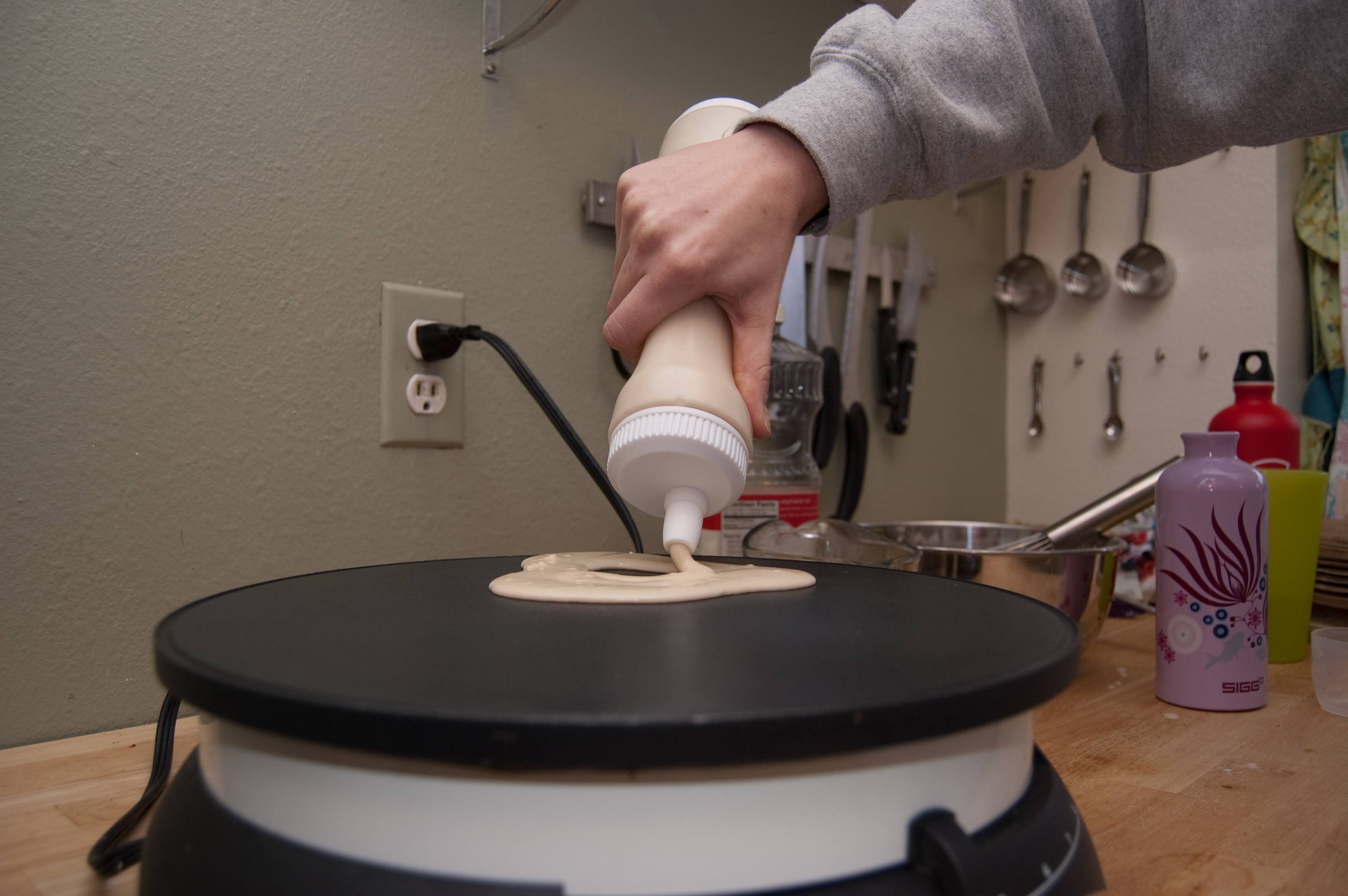
A pancake pen in use

Pancake art is an art form in which works are created on a griddle or frying pan using pancake batter as the medium applied from a bottle with a nozzle, sometimes called a pancake pen. Batters containing different food colorings may be used to create a color piece, or contrasting shades can be achieved by allowing parts of the image to cook longer. When cooking is complete, the pancake is flipped over to reveal the final image.
