= Leipziger Allerlei =

Regional German vegetable dish

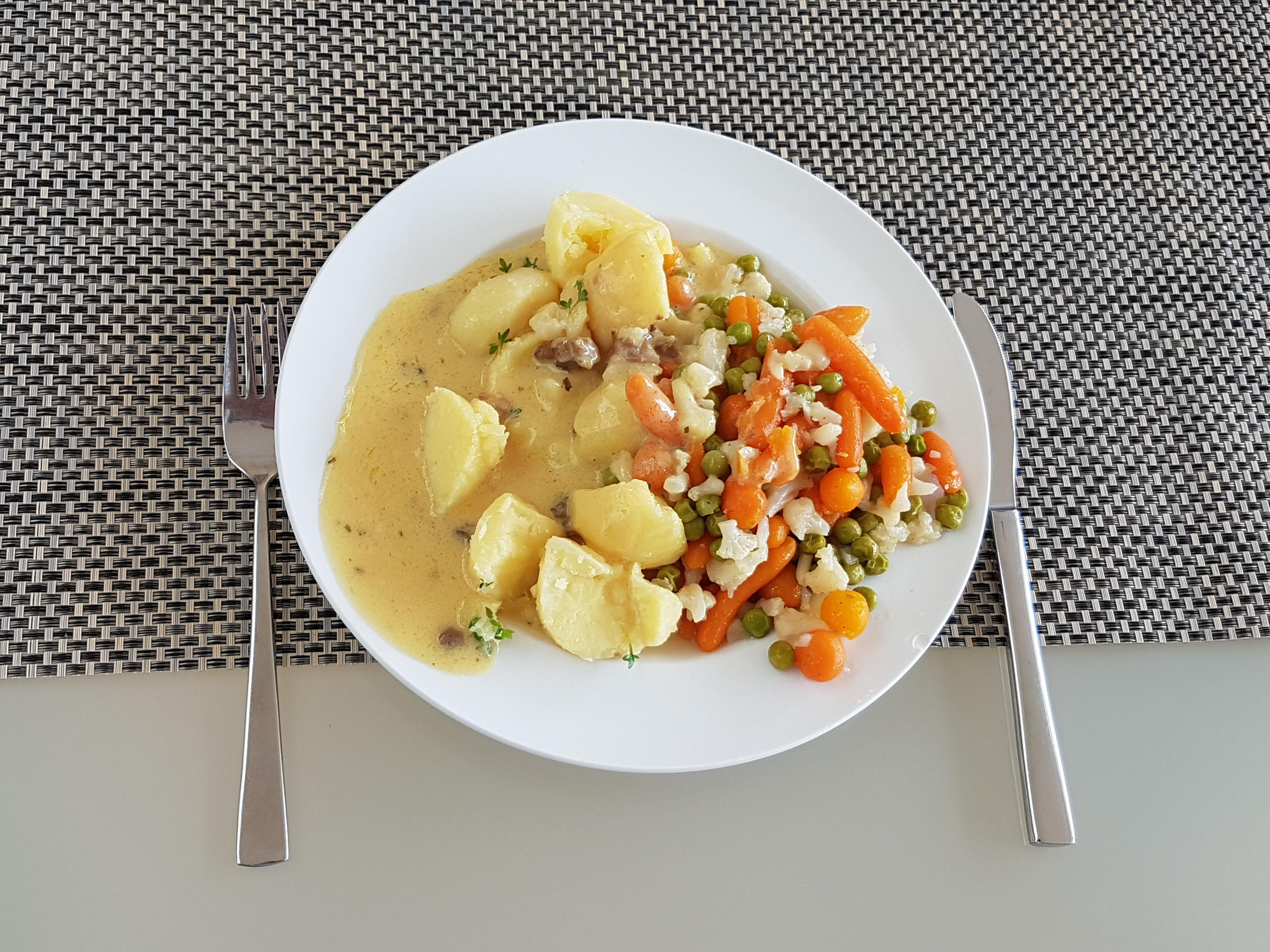
Leipziger Allerlei with morel-cress-Hollandaise sauce and potatoes

Leipziger Allerlei is a regional German vegetable dish that may be served as a main or side course. It is named after the city of Leipzig and consists of a mixture of various vegetables such as young peas, carrots, green beans, asparagus heads, morels, and celery. Cauliflower and kohlrabi are often added; occasionally onions are used too. There are numerous variations to the basic recipe.

A classic Leipziger Allerlei also includes a sauce made from crayfish butter, crayfish tails and semolina dumplings.

== History ==
According to legend, the dish was invented in Leipzig after the Napoleonic Wars to protect the city from beggars and tax collectors: in storing the more sustaining and more expensive meat-based dishes, and serving vegetables instead, city officials hoped to encourage beggars and tax collectors to move on to neighbouring cities. City clerk Malthus Hempel, is said to have suggested to the city fathers: "Let's hide the bacon and bring only vegetables to the table, on Sundays maybe a piece of sausage or a crab from the Pleiße. And if you come and want something, you get a bowl of vegetable broth instead of meat and all the beggars and tax collectors will orientate themselves to Halle or Dresden." However, the dish is first attested in a 1745 cookbook.

According to other sources, Leipziger Allerlei represented an intermediate dish in a festive menu for which young early vegetables were used.

Leipziger Allerlei also found its way into the kitchen of privy councillor and poet Goethe.

== Preparation ==
To prepare the dish, the vegetables are cut and cooked separately, tossed in butter and arranged in a bowl. The crab butter is melted, diluted with veal stock, thickened with egg yolk and poured over the vegetables. In addition there are the cooked crab tails and semolina dumplings. In addition to salt and white pepper, the spices of nutmeg, chervil and parsley are used. There are numerous variations of the recipe: with brown butter, thickened with roux, using Mettwurst instead of crabs, toasted breadcrumbs etc.

Leipziger Allerlei is also available in tins and is a synonym for a mixture of peas and carrots with pieces of asparagus. The canned vegetables have little in common with the traditional recipe.

== Literature ==
- Ulla Heise: Leipziger Allerlei – allerlei Leipzig. Ein leicht bekömmliches Lesebuch vom Essen und Trinken aus fünf Jahrhunderten. Leipzig 1993
- "Leipziger Allerlei" In: F. Jürgen Herrmann (ed.): Herings Lexikon der Küche. Fachbuchverlag Pfanneberg, Haan-Gruiten 2012 (Lizenzausgabe Nikol, Hamburg 2016), p. 520. ISBN 978-3-86820-344-8.
