= Fläskpannkaka =

Swedish oven-made pancake

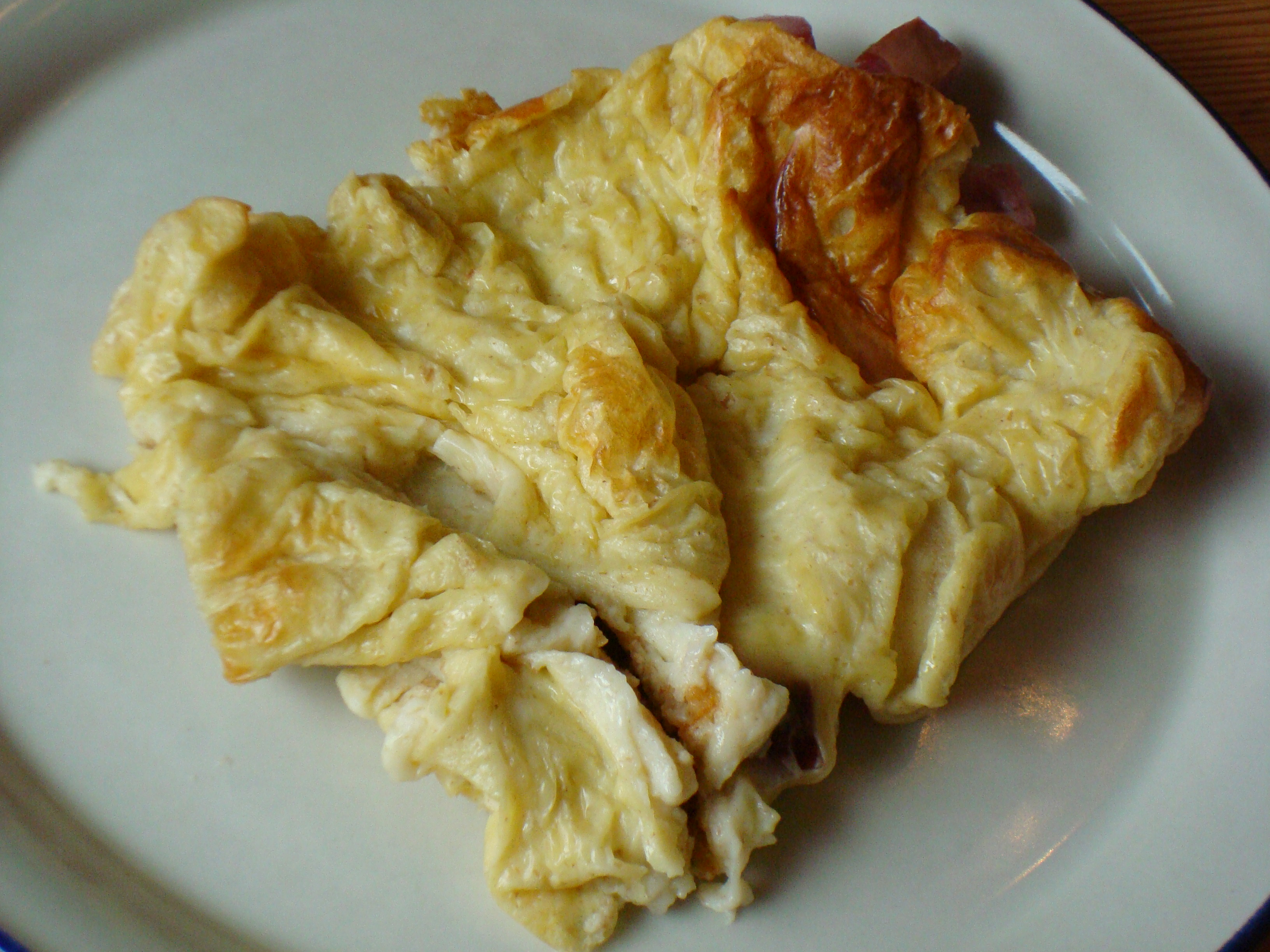
- Type: Pancake
- Place of origin: Sweden
- Main ingredients: batter, smoked pork

Fläskpannkaka is a Swedish oven-made pancake baked from eggs, milk, flour, salt (similar to a Yorkshire pudding) containing pieces of sliced pork or bacon. The ingredients are placed in a pan and baked in the oven. It is commonly served with lingonberry jam. Varieties of the dish contain onion, apples, blueberries or garlic.

== See also ==
- List of pancakes
- Swedish cuisine
