= Quarkkäulchen =

German potato pancake dish

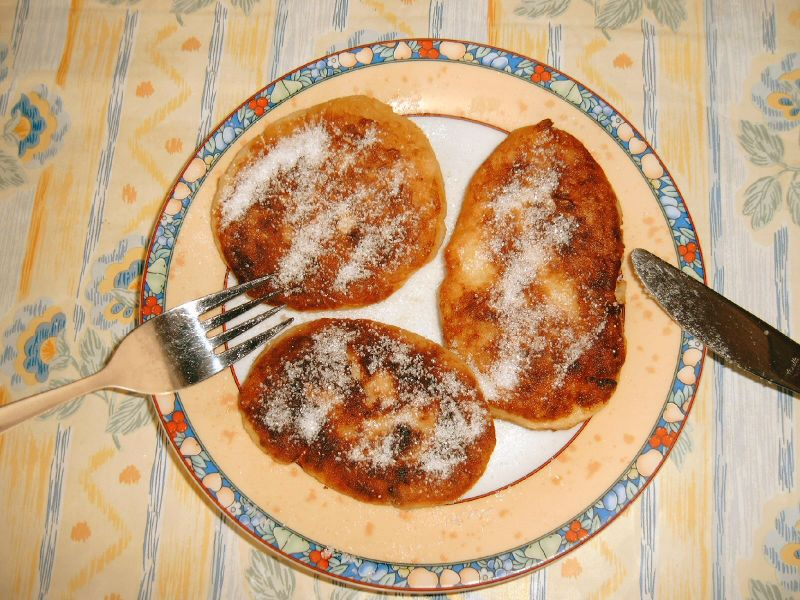
- Type: Pancake
- Place of origin: Germany
- Region or state: Saxony
- Main ingredients: Dough (mashed potatoes, quark cheese, eggs, flour)

Quarkkäulchen (German: [ˈkvaʁkˌkɔɪ̯lçən], literally "little quark ball") is a Saxon dish made from dough containing about two-thirds mashed potatoes, one-third quark cheese, eggs and flour, and perhaps spiced with cinnamon or dotted with raisins. The dough is fried in butter or clarified butter into small pancakes. These are served hot, usually with sugar, fruits or other sweet side dishes.

== See also ==
- German cuisine
- Syrniki
