= List of snack foods =

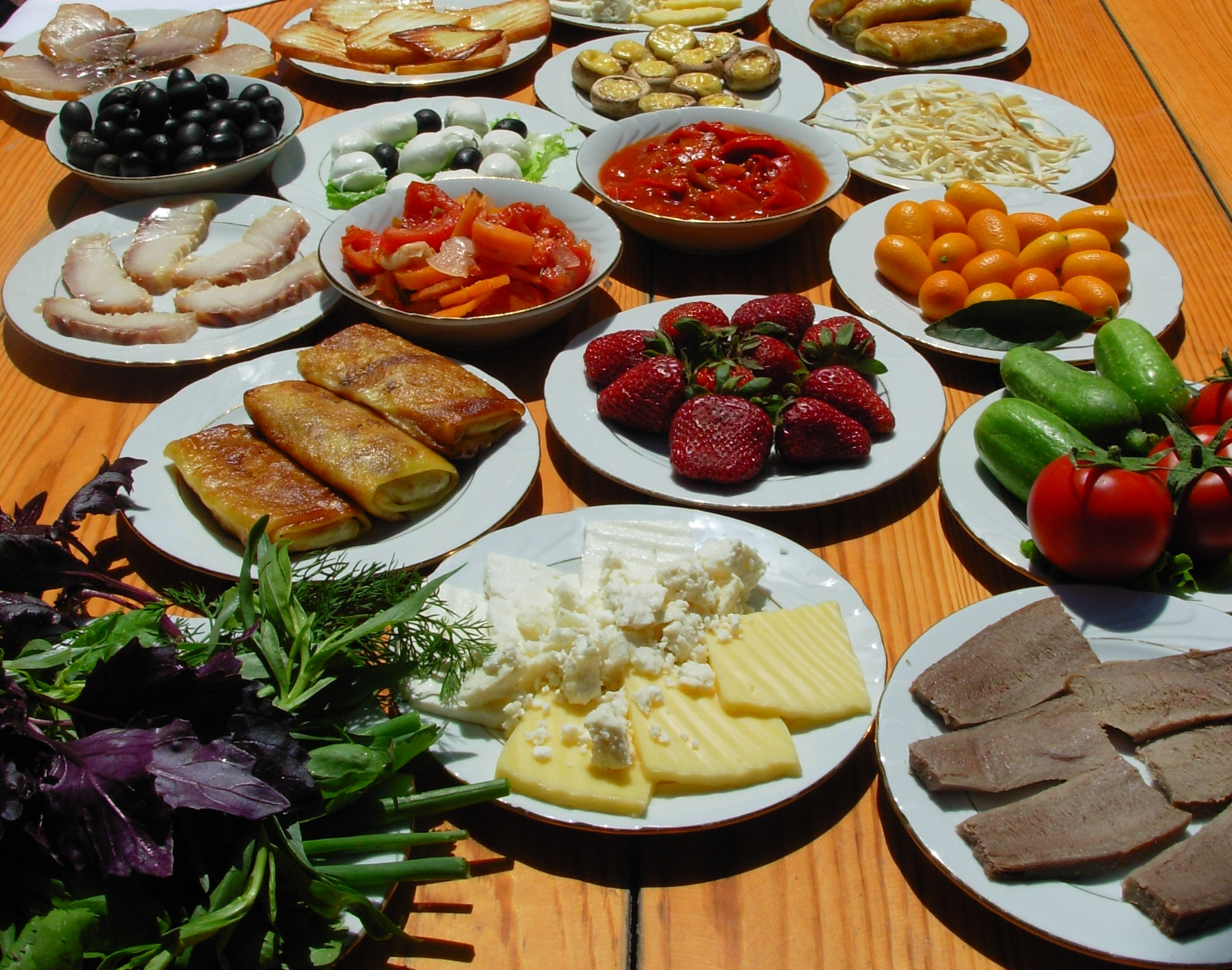
Light snacks in Azerbaijan

A snack is a small portion of food eaten between meals. They may be simple, prepackaged items; raw fruits or vegetables; or more complicated dishes but are traditionally considered less than a full meal. This list is in alphabetical order by snack type and name.

== Batter and dough-based ==
Many cultures have food that are prepared by cooking batter or dough in various forms.

=== Fried snack foods ===
These are dishes where the batter or dough is deep fried such as fritters.

Name	Image	Origin	Description
Ariselu		India	A dessert made with flour, soaked rice, and molten jaggery, fried with oil, and topped with sesame or poppy seeds.
Banana fritter		India and Southeast Asia	A fritter made by deep-frying battered banana or plantain in hot oil.
Badusha		South India	A South Indian food similar to glazed donuts, also called balushahi.
Bitterballen		Netherlands	A round-shaped beef-ragout version of croquette, typically containing a mixture of beef or veal (minced or chopped), beef broth, butter, flour for thickening, parsley, salt, and pepper, resulting in a thick ragout. Most recipes include nutmeg and there are also variations utilizing curry powder or that add in finely chopped vegetables such as carrot.
Bonda		South India	Various sweet and spicy versions exist in different regions. The process of making a spicy bonda involves deep-frying potato (or other vegetables) filling dipped in gram flour batter.
Burmese fritters		Myanmar	Traditional fritters consisting of battered and fried vegetables or seafood, typically served with a sweet and sour tamarind-based sauce. Examples are gourd buthi-kyaw and chickpea be-gyun kyaw.
Churros		Spain	Sometimes referred to as a Spanish doughnut, it's a fried-dough pastry, predominantly choux, based snack. Churros are popular in Spain, Italy, France, the Philippines, Portugal, Central America, South America and the United States. Pictured are churros drizzled with chocolate.
Cokodok		Malaysia, Brunei and Singapore	A traditional Malaysian fritter snack that is made with flour and banana. It is usually round in shape and varies in size.
Croquette		Spain	A Spanish invention with worldwide popularity, a croquette is a small breadcrumbed fried food roll containing, usually as main ingredients, mashed potatoes and/or ground meat (veal, beef, chicken, or turkey), shellfish, fish, cheese, vegetables and mixed with béchamel or brown sauce, and soaked white bread, egg, onion, spices and herbs, wine, milk, beer or any of the combination thereof, sometimes with a filling, e.g. sauteed onions or mushrooms, boiled eggs (Scotch eggs).
Curry puff	Epok-Epok	Southeast Asia	A turnover with a pastry shell that contains a filling of potatoes or sardines, onions, curry powder and spices.
Doughnut		Netherlands and United States	A fried dough snack popular in most parts of the world.
Falafel		Arabian Peninsula	A deep-fried ball or patty-shaped fritter of Arab origin, featuring in Middle Eastern cuisine, particularly Egyptian and Levantine cuisines, and made from broad beans, ground chickpeas, or both.
Gulab Jamun		India	A dessert made with milk, cheese solids and flour. It is deep-fried and soaked in sugar water flavored with green cardamom, saffron and roses.
Gulha		South Asia	A popular snack in Maldives.
Ham chim peng		Guangdong, China	A Chinese fried bread 咸煎饼 that is similar to the doughnut in texture, its batter includes five spice powder. A variation is the Shuangbaotai.
Khanom buang		Thailand	A type of crispy pancake sold by street vendors in Thailand.
Koeksister		South Africa	A deep fried braided dough drenched in lemony syrup.
Kuzhalappam		Kerala, India	A rice flour cannoli popular among the Christians in Kerala. It is prepared by deep frying roasted rice flour with onion, garlic, sesame seeds and cumin.
Malassada		Azores	A type of doughnut, made of flattened rounds of yeasted dough, coated with sugar and cinnamon or accompanied with molasses. Popular in Hawaii and the Portuguese in the United States. The Hawaiian variations are sometimes filled with custard or a flavored cream.
Onion rings		United States	Slice of onion rings dipped in batter and deep fried.
Pakora		India	A fritter found across South Asia
Parippu Vada		Kerala, India	Traditional dal fritters
Sopaipilla		Spain	A deep-fried dessert made with leavened wheat dough and shortening.
Spring roll		China	Fried rolls with a typically vegetarian filling, wrapped inside a cylindrical pastry.
Tele-bhaja (chop)		India, Bangladesh	A type of fritter made with vegetables and besan.
Tempura		Portugal and Japan	Vegetables or seafood that are fried with a batter mixed minimally in cold water and served with a grated daikon sauce. The frying method originated from Portuguese missionaries in Japan in the 16th century.
Unniyappam, Kuzhiyappam		Kerala, India	A traditional rice/flour based, deep-fried fritters in round shape.
Uzhunnu Vada		South India	Popular in South Indian states like Kerala, Tamil Nadu, and Karnataka.
Youtiao		China	A kind of bread stick that is deep fried, eaten as a snack or as an accompaniment to soy milk or porridge in Asian cultures.
Zeppole		Italy	A deep-fried dough ball filled with custard, cream, or any kind of sweet fillings.

=== Grilled snack foods ===
These are dishes where the batter or dough is grilled such as pancakes.

Name	Image	Origin	Description
Alle Belle		Goa, India	This is a delicate coconut and jaggery pancake.
Apam balik		Fujian, China	It is a folded pancake made from a batter of flour, eggs, sugar, baking powder, coconut milk and water with a peanut filling. The texture of the shell can be made crispy or fluffy (Min Jiang Kueh or Matabak Manis) depending on the batter and type of pan used.
Crêpe		France	A type of very thin pancake, usually made from wheat flour (crêpes de Froment) or buckwheat flour (galettes). The word is of French origin, deriving from the Latin crispa, meaning "curled". The Harajuku crepes in Japan contain various selections ranging from dessert to savory ingredients.
Karantika		Algeria	An iconic street food that consists of a chickpea batter topped with beaten eggs and baked. It is served with harissa and cumin, either hot on bread as a sandwich, or sliced into squares.
Pancakes		Ancient Greece and Rome	Flat, soda-leavened semi-sweet cake made with egg and flour. In the United States, pancakes are typically eaten at breakfast with syrup, fruit, and yogurt.
Poffertjes		Netherlands	A traditional Dutch pancake-like dessert, consisting of yeast-leavened batter fried on a cast-iron skillet.
Roti canai or Roti prata		Malaysia	An Indian flatbread dish, typically served with a helping of dhal curry. The dough is grilled on a hot pan and manipulated into the desired shape by the chef. Other ingredients such as egg may be added.
Scallion pancake		Taiwan	An unleavened flatbread folded with oil and minced scallions. Unlike Western pancakes, it is made from dough instead of batter. It is pan-fried, which gives it crisp edges and a chewy texture.
Thosai		South India	A thin pancake, made from a batter of fermented pulses and rice flour, cooked on a flat griddle.
Waffle		Belgium	A batter-based or dough-based cake cooked in a waffle iron patterned to give a characteristic size, shape and surface impression. There are many variations based on the type of iron and recipe used, with over a dozen regional varieties in Belgium alone.

=== Steamed snack foods ===
These are dishes where the batter or dough is steamed such as rice cakes.

Name	Image	Origin	Description
Ada		Kerala, India	A traditional Keralan delicacy, consisting of rice parcels encased in a dough made of rice flour, with sweet fillings, steamed in banana leaf and served as an evening snack or as part of breakfast. Grated coconut and rice flour are the two main ingredients.
Baozi	Baozi	China	Baozi is made from dough that is steamed, not baked. It may contain different types of fillings. If unfilled, it is often served as a staple food to side dishes.
Chwee kueh		Singapore	Plain and simple rice cakes, topped with preserved radishes.
Jajan pasar		Java, Indonesia	The term Jajan pasar refers to the sale of traditional Javanese cakes in Javanese markets.
Khandvi		Gujarat, India	A collective term used for a type of snacks in Gujarati cuisine, from the Indian state of Gujarat. The batter is cooked down to a thick paste, then spread on a flat surface and rolled into small pieces.
Kueh		South/Southeast Asia	Colorful bite sized, pudding-like snacks with a starchy texture. The kueh is made from a batter of rice or tapioca flour, glutinous rice, coconut milk and other ingredients. It can be steamed (e.g. kueh bakul), baked (e.g. kueh bahulu), deep fried (e.g. cekodok) or pan fried (e.g. apam balik).
Kutsinta		Philippines	A rice cake made with tapioca, or rice flour, brown sugar and lye with orange coloring from annatto extract, typically topped with grated coconut. It has a jelly-like chewy texture.
Mochi		Japan	Rice cakes made of short-grained glutinous rice, water, sugar and cornstarch. The batter is pounded into a paste and molded into shape. There are regional variations such as daifuku (Taiwan), kuih kochi (Malaysia) and muah chee (Singapore).
Mushi-pan (蒸しパン)		Japan	Muffin-like cakes made with flour, baking powder, eggs, milk, sugar, oil and then steamed.
Nian gao		China	Translated as "year cake", it is a sticky sweet snack, made from glutinous rice flour, brown sugar and water. It may be eaten pan fried with eggs during new year celebrations.
Putu piring		Singapore	Small pillow-y round snacks made of rice flour with a filling of either grounded peanut or palm sugar with shredded coconut.
Rice noodle roll		China	White rolls trimmed from steamed sheets of rice or tapioca flour, are seasoned with a dash of soy sauce and dressed with shallots, scallions and sesame seeds.
Soon kueh		Chaozhou, China	A steamed dumpling that is filled with yam bean, bamboo shoots and small dried shrimps, wrapped in a white skin made of rice/tapioca flour.
Tteokbokki		South Korea	These are small, cylindrical rice cakes coated in a spicy sauce.
Turnip cake		China	A snack made of various ingredients such as turnip, rice flour, dried mushroom, dried shrimp or scallop. It is made with two cooking processes: the batter containing the ingredients is wok-fried, then steamed.

== Confectionery ==
Confectionery is related to food items that are rich in sugar and often referred to as confections. Confectionery refers to the art of creating sugar based dessert forms, or subtleties (subtlety or sotelty), often with pastillage.

Name	Image	Origin	Description
Aam papad		India	A dessert snack made with mango pulp and sugar.
Bonbon		France	A small chocolate confection, usually filled with liqueur or other sweet alcoholic ingredients.
Brittle		United States	A type of confection consisting of flat broken pieces of hard sugar candy embedded with nuts such as pecans, almonds, or peanuts. Pictured is peanut brittle cracked on a serving dish. There are other variations such as chikki (India), alegria (Mexico) and huasheng tang (China).
Bubblegum		United States	A type of chewing gum, designed to be inflated out of the mouth as a bubble. As with chewing gum, the product is made from chicle and is available in various flavors.
Candy		Various	Also known as "lollies", many diverse candies exist, which include (but is not limited to) candy cane, candy corn, gumdrop, gummi bear, gummi candy, jawbreaker, jelly baby, jelly bean, licorice (also spelled liquorice), lollipop, rock candy and taffy.
Candied winter melon		China	The ash gourd is recognized for its medical properties in Ayurvedic medicine and spiritual practices in Yoga. In Asian cuisine, it is candied as sweets and added as an ingredient to pastries, desserts and soups.
Chocolate		Central America	Chocolate has been used as a drink for nearly all of its history, and has become one of the most popular food types and flavors in the world. Sweet chocolate such as milk chocolate and dark chocolate are typically eaten as a snack food, as opposed to unsweetened chocolate, which contains primarily cocoa solids and cocoa butter in varying proportions.
Chocolate bar		England	A confection in bar form comprising some or all of the following components: chocolate liquor, cocoa butter, sugar, milk. The relative presence or absence of these components form the subclasses of dark chocolate, milk chocolate, and white chocolate.
Chocolate rugelach		Jewish communities, Poland	Prepared with a cream cheese dough and a filling consisting of chocolate, jam (or jelly) and cinnamon. The addition of raisins and nuts and raisins is also common.
Chocolate truffle		France	A type of chocolate confectionery, traditionally made with a chocolate ganache centre coated in chocolate, icing sugar, cocoa powder or chopped toasted nuts (typically hazelnuts, almonds or coconut), usually in a spherical, conical, or curved shape. Other fillings may replace the ganache.
Custard		France	The custard (creme) is made from sweetened milk, cheese or cream cooked with egg or egg yolk. Variations of the dessert include creme caramel or flan and creme brulee.
Dalgona		South Korea	A caramelized lollipop from the 1960s, popularized in the Squid Game.
Doce de leite		Latin America	A confection made by slowly heating sugar and milk over several hours to create a substance that derives its taste from the Maillard reaction.
Dragon's beard candy	龙须酥	China	A traditional Chinese confectionary made by kneading and folding a dough mixture of sugar, (traditionally) maltose syrup, peanuts, sesame seeds and other ingredients. It has notable stickiness and sensitivity to moisture, similar to the floss halva or Western cotton candy.
Fudge		United States	Typically sweet and rich, it's prepared by mixing sugar, butter, and milk, heating it to the soft-ball stage at 240 °F (116 °C) and then beating the mixture while it cools so that it acquires a smooth, creamy consistency. Many variations exist with other flavorings added, such as chocolate.
Jell-O		United States	A pudding made from gelatin, popularized since the 18th century.
Geplak		Indonesia	Made from equal parts coarsely grated coconut and sugar, in equal amounts, often colored brightly. Other variations exist.
Grass jelly		China	A jelly-like dessert prepared by boiling the aged and slightly oxidized stalks and leaves of Mesona chinensis (member of the mint family) with potassium carbonate for several hours with a little starch and then cooling the liquid to a jelly-like consistency.
Kaju katli		South India	This is a South Indian dessert made with cashew nuts and sugar.
Laddu		India	A spherical sweet made of sugar syrup, jaggery and other ingredients such as fruits and nuts, sesame seeds and honey. It is regarded as universal and ancient Indian sweets.
Marshmallow		Egypt	In its modern form, typically consists of sugar and/or corn syrup, water, and gelatin, whipped to a spongy consistency and coated with corn starch. Marshmallow probably came first into being as a medicinal substance, since the mucilaginous extracts comes from the root of the marshmallow plant, Althaea officinalis, which were used as a remedy for sore throats. Concoctions of other parts of the marshmallow plant had medical purposes as well.
Marzipan		Spain and Germany	Consisting primarily of sugar or honey and almond meal, sometimes augmented with almond oil or extract. Pictured is marzipan made into the shapes of fruits.
Mousse au chocolat		France	A dessert with a light and airy texture made of chocolate, gelatin, egg white, whipped cream, pureed fruit and added flavoring.
Nougat		Turkey and Syria	A variety of similar traditional confectioneries made with sugar and/or honey, roasted nuts (almonds, walnuts, pistachios, hazelnuts, and recently macadamia nuts are common), whipped egg whites, and sometimes chopped candied fruit.
Panforte		Italy	A traditional Italian dessert containing fruits and nuts, and resembles fruitcake or Lebkuchen. It may date back to 13th century Siena, in Italy's Tuscany region. Its preparation includes baking a mixture of sugar dissolved in honey, various nuts, fruits and spices and flour. The finished cake is dusted with icing sugar.
Pastila		Kolomna, Russia	A traditional fruit confectionary made from sour apples or mashed northern berries. The fruit extract is sweetened with sugar or honey, lightened with egg white and baked in the oven for hours.
Pavlova		New Zealand	A fluffy, meringue-based confection named after the renowned ballerina Anna Pavlova. It is one of New Zealand's national desserts.
Preserved candied fruit		China	Originally intended as treats for the imperial court and a means to keep summer and autumn fruits into winter. Fruit such as green plums, apricots and peaches are dried after boiling in honey (or sugar syrup). Beijing is considered the best place to taste mijian 蜜餞 and guofu 果脯.
Pudding		England	Most often refers to a dessert, but can also be a savory dish. Depending on its ingredients such a pudding may be served as a part of the main course or as a dessert.
Rice krispie treats		United States	A sweet dessert or snack made from Rice Krispies, melted butter or margarine, and melted marshmallows. Sometimes marshmallows and/or cereal that is seasonal is used to make these treats holiday-specific.
Sandesh		Bangladesh	A popular Bengali sweet made with milk and sugar.
S'mores		United States	A traditional nighttime campfire treat popular in the United States and Canada consisting of a roasted marshmallow and a layer of chocolate sandwiched between two pieces of graham cracker.
Tanghulu		China	Stewers of candied haw coated in a red sweet and sour syrup.
Toffee		England	Made by caramelizing sugar or molasses (creating inverted sugar) along with butter, and occasionally flour. Toffee is sometimes prepared with nuts or raisins.
Turkish delight		Turkey	A family of confections based on a gel of starch and sugar. Premium varieties consist largely of chopped dates, pistachios and hazelnuts or walnuts bound by the gel; the cheapest are mostly gel, generally flavored with rosewater, mastic, bergamot orange or lemon.
Wagashi		Japan	A traditional confectionary, made from mochi, azuki beans, fruit and seasonal plant-based materials, often intricately carved into artistic shapes, popularized from the Edo period.

== Cookies, cakes and pastries ==
=== Cookies ===
Name	Image	Origin	Description
Alfajores		Argentina	Shortbread cookies with all sorts of sweet fillings such as thick caramel dulce de leche.
Almond cookie		Macau	A Chinese cookie 杏仁餅 that is made with grounded mung beans. It is a recommended snack in Macau.
Appenzeller Biberli		Switzerland	A gingerbread specialty that contains almond paste or marzipan with notes of honey, lemon zest, and sugar.
Arrowroot		England	Arrowroot used to be very popular in British cuisine, and Napoleon supposedly said the reason for the British love of arrowroot was to support the commerce of their colonies. It can be consumed in the form of biscuits, puddings, jellies, cakes, hot sauces, and also with beef tea, milk or veal broth, and noodles in Korean and Vietnamese cuisine.
Chebakia		Morocco	A sesame cookie that is fried and covered with honey. They're typically shaped as a flower.
Chocolate chip cookie		United States	A drop cookie that features chocolate chips as its distinguishing ingredient.
Cookie		Scotland	In the United States, Canada and Australia a cookie is a small, flat, baked treat, usually containing fat, flour, eggs and sugar. In Scotland, a cookie is a plain bun. In most English-speaking countries outside North America, including the United Kingdom, the most common word for a small, flat, baked treat, usually containing fat, flour, eggs and sugar is biscuit, however in many regions both terms are used, such as the American-inspired Maryland Cookies, while in others the two words have different meanings. Pictured are butter cookies.
Ginger snaps		Europe	A globally popular cookie based snack food, flavored with ginger. Ginger snaps and gingerbread are made using cookie dough. The former is baked slightly longer than the latter to attain the snappy crispiness.
Macaron		France	A sweet meringue-based sandwich cookie made with egg white, icing sugar, granulated sugar, almond meal, and often food coloring. Macarons are expensive because of the process and time to make them.
Oatmeal cookie		United States	Cookies prepared with oatmeal. Raisins and other ingredients such as chocolate chips are also sometimes used.
Peanut butter cookie		United States	A type of cookie that is distinguished by having peanut butter as a principal ingredient. The cookie generally originated in the United States, its development dating back to the 1910s.
Rosette		Turkey	Thin, cookie-like fritters made with iron molds that are found in many cultures. Rosettes are crispy and typified by their lacy pattern. The cooking process can be traced to the Ottoman Empire. Versions of the cookie exist in northern Europe, Iran, Turkey, Sri Lanka and other places. One variation is Achappam, popular in Kerala.
Sandwich cookie		United States	A type of cookie made from two thin cookies or medium cookies with a filling between them. The oreo, introduced in 1912, is said to be America's best selling cookie with $675 million annual revenue.
Shortbread		Scotland	A traditional cookie that contains a high butter content made without any leavening agent.
Speculoos		Belgium	Crispy spiced cookies linked to Saint Nicholas Day.
Stroopwafels		Holland	A thin, round waffle cookie made from two layers of sweet baked dough, held together by caramel filling.
Yakgwa		South Korea	A traditional cookie made of brown sugar, syrup, honey, flour and cooking oil with flavors such as sesame, orange peel and ginger.

=== Baked Cakes ===
Name	Image	Origin	Description
Baumkuchen		Germany	A spit cake made by layering dough or batter onto a tapered cylindrical rotation spit. It is a popular dessert in Japan.
Castella		Japan	A kind of honey sponge cake, popular in Japan, said to have originated from Portuguese merchants in the 16th century.
Gansito		Mexico	A Mexican snack cake that is filled with both strawberry jelly and a creamy filling. They are covered in chocolate and have a chocolate sprinkle topping. It was created in 1957 by Marinela (the pastries division of the breadmaking Bimbo brand).
Jaffa Cakes		Scotland	Introduced by McVitie and Price in 1927 and named after Jaffa oranges, and now manufactured by numerous companies including McVities, Cadbury and other biscuit manufacturers, Tesco and other supermarket chains.
Kueh lapis		Indonesia	Also known as "thousand layer cake", it is made by ladling butter onto successive layers until the batter is used up.
Lamingtons		Australia	A chocolate filled sponge cake covered in coconut flakes.
Madeleine		France	Small baked sponge cakes with a slightly crispy exterior. Variations include the financier (France) and bahulu (Malaysia).
Pandan cake		Singapore	A light fluffy sponge cake flavored with pandan extract, it is a fusion of European cake-making with local ingredients.
Snack cake		Various	A baked dessert confectionery made with cake and icing.
Twinkie		United States	An iconic American sponge cake with an archetypal banana cream filling that was invented in 1930.

=== Pastries ===
Name	Image	Origin	Description
Cheesecake		Europe	A dessert made with soft fresh cheese, eggs, and sugar. It has a baked custard center and crumb crust.
Croissant		Austria	A crescent shaped pastry with a buttery and flaky texture. Made by layering dough with butter in a laminating process.
Egg Tart		Portugal and France	Baked pastry consisting of an outer shell filled with egg custard. It is known variously as pastel de nata (Portugal), custard tart (France, United Kingdom) and egg tart in Asia.
Gai Zai Peng		Guangzhou, China	A kind of doughy pastry made from lard, rice wine, peanuts, maltose, eggs, edible seeds, fermented beancurd, five spice powder and flour. A biscuit/cracker variation is kampar chicken biscuit (Ipoh, Malaysia).
Knafeh		Egypt	A middle-eastern cake made with fine noodle pastry, cheese or cream filling and drenched with a sugar syrup known as attar. It is eaten during Ramadan.
Mooncake		China	A round festive pastry with a mushy crust and thick rich filling made from lotus seed, red bean paste and other ingredients.
Palmier		France	Made from puff pastry using a laminated dough without the use of yeast. They are known variously as genjie pies in Japan, French hearts in India, and butterfly pastries in China.
Pastry		Europe	Baked food made with a dough of flour, water, and shortening that may be savory or sweetened. Pictured is a profiterole, also known as a cream puff.
Pie		Various	A baked dish made of pastry dough casing that carries a filling of sweet or savory ingredients.
Pineapple cake		Taiwan	A sweet traditional Taiwanese pastry containing butter, flour, egg, milk powder, sugar, and pineapple jam or slices.
Scones		United Kingdom	A scone is a British baked good, made with wheat or oatmeal with baking powder as a leavening agent. The texture is light and crumbly, often served with jam and clotted cream.
Spanakopita		Greece	A pie that comprises chopped spinach, feta cheese, onions or scallions, eggs, and seasoning.
Suncake		Taiwan	A popular Taiwanese dessert with maltose fillings originally from the city of Taichung, Taiwan.
Taiyaki	Taiyaki	Japan	A Japanese baked pastry in the shape of a fish with sweetened azuki beans or other savory fillings.
Tambun biscuit		Penang, Malaysia	A pastry with a sweet crust and salty filling. It is made from wheat flour, sugar, green bean paste, fried onions, lard and salt.
Tiramisu		Italy	A layered and coffee flavored dessert, made of ladyfingers (savoiardi), egg yolks, sugar, coffee, mascarpone and cocoa powder. Marsala wine, amaretto or a coffee-based liqueur may be added to the recipe. Its name means "pick me up" or "cheer me up".
Toaster pastry		United States	A type of bakers' confection, thin rectangles often made of rice bran, molasses, flour, syrup, and shortening. One side usually has a coating of icing that has been dried with starch.

== Drinks ==
Name	Image	Origin	Description
Air Mata Kucing		Malaysia	A herbal drink made with monk fruit, dried longan, winter melon and rock sugar. It was rated on CNN as one of the most delicious drinks.
Amazake		Japan	A traditional sweet, low- or non-alcohol (depending on recipes) Japanese drink made from fermented rice. Amazake dates from the Kofun period, and it is mentioned in the Nihon Shoki, the second oldest book of classical Japanese history.
Atole		Mexico	A traditional hot corn- and masa-based beverage of Mexican origin. It can have different flavors added such as vanilla, cinnamon, and guava.
Bandung		Indonesia	A drink made with rose water, condensed milk and soda water.
Beer		Mesopotamia	One of the oldest alcoholic drinks in the world. Produced by the brewing and fermentation of starches from cereal grains such as malted barley, wheat, maize (corn), rice and oats. Example: Free Beer is known as an open source beer.
Bubble tea		Taichung, Taiwan	A tea-based drink. It includes chewy tapioca balls ("boba" or "pearls") or a wide range of other toppings.
Buttermilk		India and Nepal	A fermented dairy drink derived traditionally from the liquid left behind after churning butter out of cultured cream. A variation is Sambhaaram in Kerala where the curd is diluted with water spiced with green chilies, ginger and curry leaves.
Chocolate		England	Hot chocolate, also known as hot cocoa or drinking chocolate, is a heated drink consisting of shaved or melted chocolate or cocoa powder, heated milk or water, and usually a sweetener. It is often garnished with whipped cream or marshmallows.
Cider		England	An alcoholic beverage made from the fermented juice of apples.
Coffee		Ethiopia, South Arabia	A beverage prepared from the dried seeds of Coffea species. The four main types of beans Arabica, Robusta, Excelsa and Liberica have different taste profiles. Coffee contains caffeine, a mild stimulant. It is brewed with various methods such as French Press, percolator and drip. Coffee can be drunk as espresso shot, black, latte (espresso with milk) and other combinations. One of the expensive coffee type is kopi luwak, produced from partially digested coffee beans excreted by the Asian palm civet.
Cola		United States	A carbonated drink flavored with vanilla, cinnamon, citrus oils and other ingredients. Its name comes from one of the ingredients, kola nut which contains caffeine. Among the different colas, Coke is known as the world's most popular carbonated soft drink.
Colada morada		Ecuador	A purple and thick drink derived from local tropical fruits, spices and corn flour. It is a festive drink to commemorate a happy journey from life to death.
Egg Coffee		Vietnam	A popular drink prepared with egg yolks, sugar, condensed milk and robusta coffee, served throughout Vietnam.
Eggnog		England	Eggnog is a festive drink made with milk, cream, sugar, egg yolks, whipped egg whites and infused with a distilled spirit (e.g. brandy or rum), often with a dash of spices (e.g. cinnamon, nutmeg and vanilla).
Energy drinks		Thailand	A type of drink containing stimulant compounds, usually caffeine, marketed as providing mental and physical stimulation. Examples are Red Bull and Monster.
Horchata		Mexico	A grain or seed based beverage that sometimes contains animal milk.
Juice		Various	A beverage derived from the forced extraction of liquids from fruit and vegetables, using a juicer.
Kefir		Russia	A fermented milk drink similar to a thin yogurt or ayran that is made from kefir grains.
Lassi		India	This drink is made with yoghurt, water, spice. Fruit is sometimes added.
Matcha		Japan and China	Macha is made from finely grounded powder of specially grown and processed green tea leaves in China. The tradition of whisking the tea powder with hot water in a bowl is popularized from the Song dynasty (960-1279) in China.
Milk		Various	Milk is an agricultural product from dairy farms. It can be flavored with fruit juices to create flavored milk or blended with ice cream and flavorings to create milkshake. The addition of malted milk or powder as an ingredient to other foods and beverages adds distinct flavors.
Root beer	Hikers enjoying large root beer floats	United States	A soft drink traditionally made using the root bark of the Sassafras tree Sassafras albidum or the vine of Smilax ornata (also known as Sarsaparilla) as the primary flavor. A variation is the root beer float where a dollop of ice-cream is added to the drink.
Sikhye		South Korea	A traditional sweet Korean rice beverage, usually served as a dessert. It also contains grains of cooked rice and in some cases pine nuts.
Soft drinks		Various	Any water-based flavored drink, usually but not necessarily carbonated, and typically include added sweetener. The soft drink can be mixed with liquor to create cocktails. Popular alcohol-soda pairings include rum and coke, gin and tonic and whiskey and ginger-ale.
Soy milk		China	A plant-based milk drink produced by soaking and grinding soybeans, boiling the mixture, and filtering out remaining particulates. It is a stable emulsion of oil, water, and protein.
Smoothie		Various	A smoothie is made by puréeing ingredients in a blender. Unlike juicing, everything in the original food such as fruit fiber is retained in the final concoction. Therefore, smoothies have a more viscous consistency than juices.
Sports drinks		Various	Functional beverages whose stated purpose is to help athletes replace water, electrolytes, and energy before, during and especially after training or competition. Examples are Gatorade and Powerade.
Tamagozake		Japan	A Japanese drink consisting of heated sake, sugar and a raw egg.
Tea		China	Tea is made by steeping a sachet of harvested plant materials in hot water. Tea brewed from oxidized Camellia tea leaves from China, India and other principal tea producing countries is known as black tea. If brewed from unoxidized Camellia tea leaves, the tea is known as green tea. Red tea or Rooibos is brewed from Aspalathus tea leaves in South Africa. Flowering tea, such as chrysanthemum, jasmine or chamomile, is brewed from flowers. Tea is often enjoyed as Milk tea, popularized in many countries (e.g. English tea, Thai tea, Masala chai and Teh tarik). Tea is known to have various therapeutic properties.
Tejuino		Jalisco, Mexico	A cold beverage made from fermented corn. It is often served with a scoop of shaved ice.

== Frozen ==
Name	Image	Origin	Description
Frozen custard		Coney Island, New York, United States	A cold dessert similar to ice cream, but made with eggs in addition to cream and sugar. It was invented in Coney Island, New York in 1919, when ice cream vendors Archie and Elton Kohr found that adding egg yolks to ice cream created a smoother texture and helped the ice cream stay cold longer. In their first weekend on the boardwalk, the Kohr brothers sold 18,460 cones.
Ice cream		China	A frozen dessert usually made from dairy products, such as milk and cream, and often combined with fruits or other ingredients and flavors. Most varieties contain sugar, although some are made with other sweeteners. Examples of ice cream variations are frozen custard, frozen yogurt and gelato. In some countries, such as the United States, the phrase "ice cream" applies to a specific variety, and most governments regulate the commercial use of the various terms according to the relative quantities of the main ingredients. In other countries, such as Italy and Argentina, one word is used for all variants.
Ice pop		San Francisco, United States	A water-based frozen snack that is made by freezing flavored liquid (such as fruit juice) around a stick. The first recorded ice pop was created in 1905 by 11-year-old Frank Epperson of San Francisco, who left a glass of soda water powder and water outside in his back porch with a wooden mixing stick in it. In the United States and Canada frozen ice on a stick is generically referred to as a popsicle due to the early popularity of the Popsicle brand. In Ireland the product is also referred to as a freeze pop. In the United Kingdom the term ice lolly is used. Ice block is used in parts of Australia and New Zealand, as well as icy pole, after a brand of the same name.
Iced desserts		Various	A large family of ice-based desserts made from fine ice shavings and sweet condiments or syrup. Kakigōri かき氷 (Japan) is traditionally made from frozen blocks of mineral water and served to the Japanese aristocracy in summer during the Heian period. Other examples: Bingsu (South Korea), Tshuah-ping (Taiwan), Ais kacang (Malaysia, Singapore), Bici bici (Turkey), Slurpee (United States) and Churchill (Costa Rica). There are other variations such as Italian Ice, Maple taffy (Canada) and sorbets.
Milkshake		United States	A sweet, cold beverage which is usually made from milk, ice cream or iced milk, and flavorings or sweeteners such as fruit syrup or chocolate sauce. Outside the United States, the drink is sometimes called a "thickshake" or a "thick milkshake" or in New England, a "frappe". When the term "milkshake" was first used in print in 1885, milkshakes were an alcoholic whiskey drink that has been described as a "sturdy, healthful eggnog type of drink, with eggs, whiskey, etc., served as a tonic as well as a treat". However, by 1900, the term referred to "wholesome drinks made with chocolate, strawberry, or vanilla syrups." By the "early 1900s people were asking for the new treat, often with ice cream."
Sundae		United States	A sundae is an ice cream frozen dessert of American origin that typically consists of one or more scoops of ice cream topped with sauce or syrup and other toppings such as sprinkles, whipped cream, marshmallows, peanuts, maraschino cherries, or other fruits (e.g. bananas and pineapple in a banana split). The fruit parfait (pictured) from Japan is one type of sundae, made with seasonal fruits and traditional Japanese sweets.

== Natural snacks ==
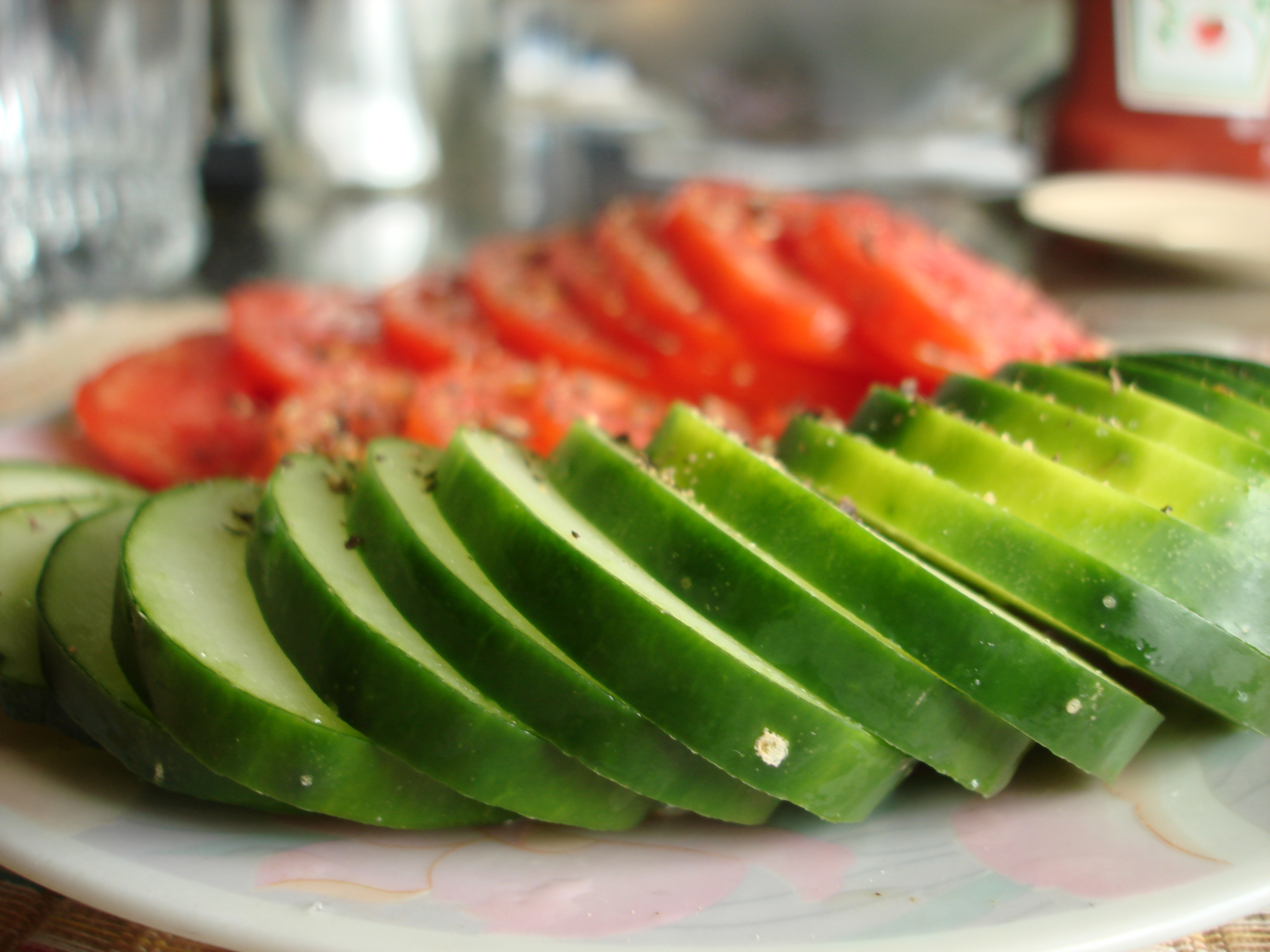
Sliced cucumbers and tomatoes can be a natural and healthy snack.

=== Fruits and vegetables ===
- Airplane olive
- Apple
- Aamshotto - Bengali sun-dried mango fruit rolls.
- Banana
- Banana boats – a traditional campfire treat consisting of a banana cut lengthwise and stuffed with marshmallow and chocolate, then wrapped in aluminium foil and cooked in the embers left over from a campfire
- Carrot
- Celery
- Cherries
- Crudités – platters of chopped vegetables usually served with dips
- Dried apple – Czech snack "křížaly"
- Dried fruit – dehydrated
- Fruit roll
- Grapes
- Honeydew
- Kiwi
- Orange
- Peach
- Plums
- Raisins
- Salsa
- Strawberries
- Tostones – also known as tostón, they are made from sliced green (unripe) plantains cut either length-wise or width-wise and are twice fried
- Watermelon

=== Seeds, nuts, grains and legumes ===
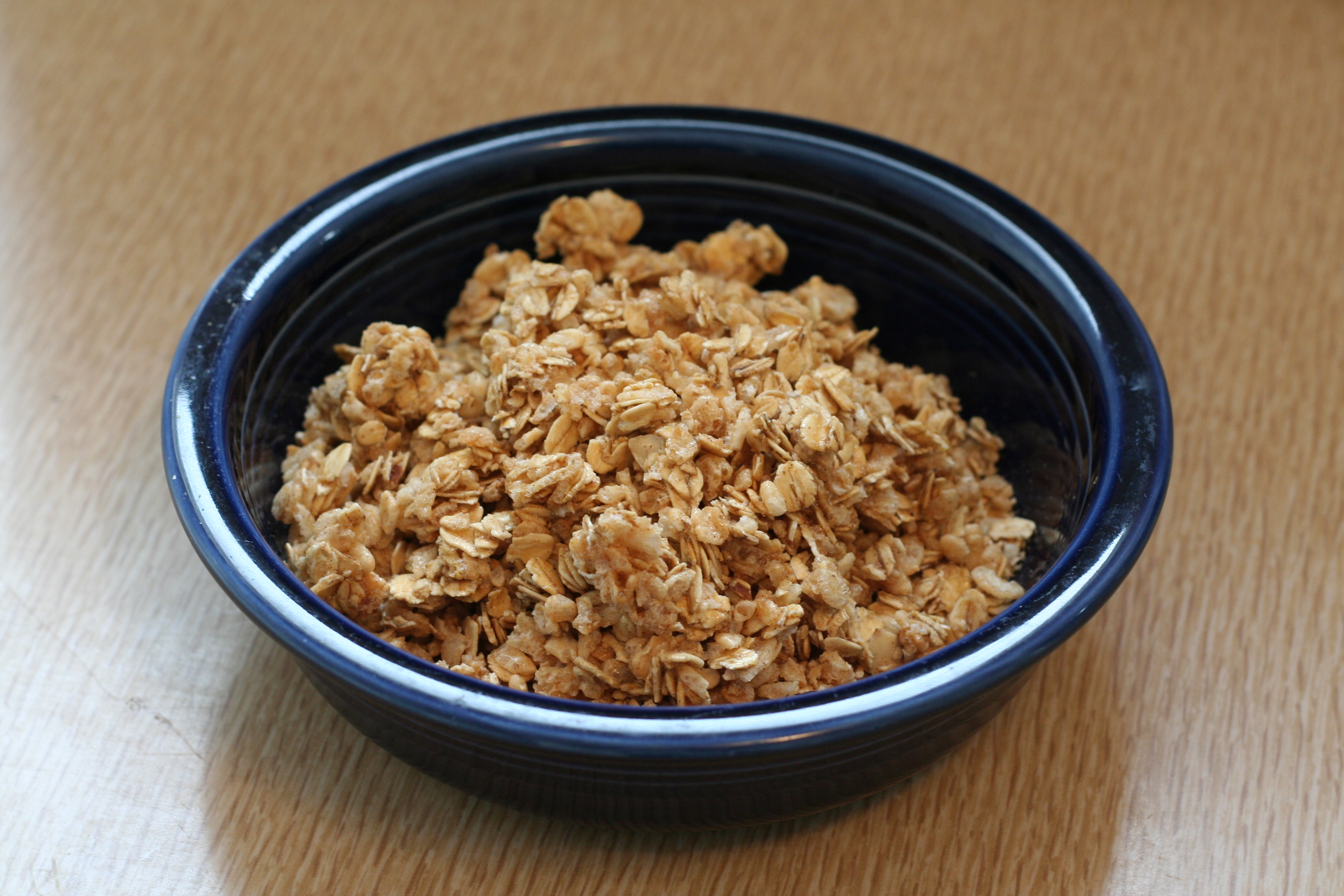
A bowl of granola

- Almonds
- Cashews
- Cereal bar
- Coconut
- Granola
- Leblebi
- Macadamia nuts
- Mixed nuts
- Nuts
- Party mix
- Peanuts and honey-roasted peanuts
- Pine nuts
- Pistachio
- Popcorn
- Pumpkin seeds
- Rice cake
- Soy nuts
- Sunflower seeds
- Trail mix, gorp, scroggin
- Walnuts

== Savory snacks ==
Name	Image	Origin	Description
Beans on Toast		England	A staple food made with white bread and baked beans.
Bisque		France	A smooth, creamy, highly seasoned soup of French origin, classically based on a strained broth (coulis).
Canapé		France	Small slices of toast or crostini, with a savory topping such as cheese, shrimp, pâté or anchovies.
Charcuterie		France	Dishes of cured meats, cheeses, crackers, and other small snacks, usually presented on a board.
Chawanmushi		Japan	An egg custard dish in Japanese cuisine.
Crudités		France	Colorful pieces of raw, or barely cooked, vegetables of a variety of flavors and textures arranged together as an appetizer.
Dim Sum		China	A range of small Cantonese dishes that are typically consumed collectively as brunch or singularly as a snack.
Dolma		Balkans, Middle East and Caucasus	A traditional dish of Armenian cuisine - minced meat wrapped in grape leaves.
Dumplings		China	A broad category of dishes that contain cooked dough with a filling. Pictured is Xiaolongbao (Shanghai, China), a steamed dumpling filled with pork.
Esquites		Mexico	A popular street food made with matured corn kernels, epazote, and salt and consumed as a snack on-the-go. It is typically served in small cups, topped with chili peppers, lime juice, or cotija cheese.
French fries		Belgium and United States	Potatoes are cut into strips and deep fried. French fries are served as a snack or side dish.
Fried cassava		Indonesia	Cassava is a tropical crop that is cooked and eaten in Africa and Southeast Asia. Singkong goreng is a traditional dish that is cooked by steaming and frying the root vegetable in combination with salt, garlic and coriander oil.
Fried plantain		Ghana, Nigeria and Ivory Coast	The plantains are peeled, sliced or diced, seasoned with spices, and fried until the sugar caramelizes.
Gimbap		Korea	A Korean dish made from cooked rice, vegetables, fish, and meat rolled in dried sheets of seaweed and served in bite-sized slices.
Gua-bao		Taiwan	Consists of a slice of stewed meat and other condiments sandwiched between flat steamed bread.
Mango Sticky Rice	Mango Sticky Rice	Thailand	A traditional Southeast Asian and South Asian dessert, khao niao mamuang is made with glutinous rice, fresh mango and coconut milk. It originated from the late Ayutthaya period.
Meze		Ottoman Empire	An assortment of small dishes served as appetizers in countries of the former Ottoman Empire.
Miang kham		Thailand and Laos	A traditional snack made of shallots, bird's eye chili peppers, ginger, garlic, nuts and small dried shrimps, said to be introduced to the Siamese court by the Princess Dara Rasmi.
Onigiri		Japan	Triangular or cylindrical shapes of rice, often wrapped in nori with various types of fillings such as pickled ume (umeboshi).
Popiah		Fujian/Chaoshan, China	A Fujianese/Teochew-style spring roll with a thin, paper-like crepe, filled with an assortment of fresh, shredded, and cooked ingredients such as turnips, carrots, eggs and peanuts.
Roasted chestnut		East Asia, Europe and New York City	A popular autumn and winter street food in East Asia, Europe, and New York City.
Roasted sweet potato		East Asia	A popular winter street food in East Asia.
Rojak		Java, Indonesia	A salad consisting of fruits, vegetables, fritters and tofu puffs served with a spicy dressing made from ground chili, palm sugar and peanuts. There are Malaysian and Singaporean variations to the Indonesian dish.
Sauerkraut		Rome	Finely cut raw cabbage that has been fermented by lactic acid bacteria. It is eaten in Germany and France, variously as Soljanka in Eastern Europe and Russia, Rakott kaposzta in Hungary, Bigos in Poland and Kimchi in Korea.
Smørrebrød		Denmark	A type of hors d'oeuvre served in Danish style on buttered bread.
Sushi		Japan	A dish, prepared with short-grained rice, mixed with vinegar (鮨飯, sushi-meshi), usually with some sugar and salt, and a variety of ingredients (ねた), such as seafood (often raw) and vegetables.
Tahu goreng		Indonesia	A generic name for a variety of dishes that feature fried tofu in Indonesia, Malaysia and Singapore. The bean curd is fried until golden brown, and garnished with ingredients (e.g. bean sprouts and cucumbers), served with a spicy dressing. It can also be stuffed with a vegetable filling. Variations are eaten elsewhere such as Abura-age (Sendai, Japan).
Tapas		Spain	A hot or cold appetizer or snack-sized dishes in Spanish cuisine, served in tapas bars. The dishes are known as bocas in Central American countries. The vegetarian dishes in Mexico are known as botanas.
Xian dou jiang		Taiwan	A type of soup made with soy milk, small dried shrimps, sichuan mustard, sesame oil and green onion.
Zakuski		Eastern Europe	An assortment of cold hors d'oeuvres, entrées and snacks in food culture in Slavic-speaking countries.
Zongzi		China	A seasonal food from ancient times, eaten during the Duanwu festival. It is made of glutinous rice, flavored and/or stuffed with other ingredients, wrapped with bamboo leaves in the shape of an ox-horn.

=== Bars ===
Name	Image	Origin	Description
Bar		Various	A category of food bars containing sweet and savory ingredients.
Energy bar		United States	Food bars containing cereals and other high energy ingredients, sometimes containing high amounts of protein. The first energy bar in the American marketplace was Space Food Sticks which Pillsbury Company created in the late 1960s to capitalize on the popularity of the U.S. space program. More recently, energy bars have been marketed towards health-conscious consumers, in particular as a post-workout snack.
Flapjack		England	A sweet tray-baked oat bar made from rolled oats, butter, brown sugar and golden syrup. The item is known as a "flapjack" in the United Kingdom and Ireland and as a "cereal bar" in Australia and New Zealand. In other countries such products are referred to as granola bars.
Granola bar		England	Granola bars were invented by Stanley Mason and have become popular as a snack, similar to the traditional flapjack oat bar or muesli bar familiar in the Commonwealth countries.

=== Bread/Sandwiches ===
Name	Image	Origin	Description
Bagel		Poland	A bread product, traditionally shaped by hand into the form of a ring from yeasted wheat dough, roughly hand-sized, which is first boiled for a short time in water and then baked.
Baking powder biscuit		United States	A variety of baked bread with a firm exterior and soft crumbly interior, made with baking powder as a leavening agent (rather than yeast), flour, salt, shortening or butter and milk or buttermilk. It is also known as quick bread in the US. A variation is biscotti (Italy).
Bread		Egypt and Europe	A food made of flour, water, and yeast mixed together and baked.
Bread Pudding		United Kingdom	A pudding made with bread, milk, and egg.
Brioche		France	Bread that is enriched with milk, eggs and butter, and known for its soft and fluffy texture. It is a popular snack in France.
Croutons		France	Toasted or fried bread that are normally cubed and seasoned, are used to add texture and flavor to salads, soups and stews.
Fairy bread		Australia	Sliced white bread spread with butter or margarine and covered with tiny beads of sugar, served at children parties.
Flatbread		Mesopotamia and Egypt	Bread made with flour; water, milk, yogurt (or similar), and salt, and then thoroughly rolled into a flattened dough. Many flatbreads are unleavened, although some are leavened, such as pita bread. Examples are the tortilla (Central America), made from corn or wheat and the totopo (Oaxaca, Mexico), made from corn.
Focaccia		Italy	A flat leavened oven-baked Italian bread. It differs from pizza in that the focaccia is left to rise while the pizza is baked immediately.
French toast		Rome	Bread slices are soaked or dipped in a mixture of eggs, milk or cream and flavoring, then fried in butter or olive oil until browned or cooked through.
Fried bake		Caribbean	A type of bread usually eaten with saltfish.
Fruit bun		Commonwealth	A type of sweet roll made with fruit, fruit peel, spices and sometimes nuts.
Fruit sandwich		Japan	A kind of sandwich that consists of seasonal fruits and whipped cream with milk bread, popular in Japan.
Houska		Czech Republic	Literally translated as "knitted bread", this is a traditional bread roll baked and consumed in the Czech Republic. Typical ingredients include wheat flour (but other types can be used), water, yeast and salt. They are topped with poppy seeds, caraway seeds, linseeds or sea salt.
Kepta duona		Lithuania	A simple snack of rye bread, sliced, pan-fried and rubbed with garlic. Modern varieties often come with cheese or mayonnaise toppings. The snack is commonly served in bars, paired with beer or gira (kvass).
Knäckebröd		Sweden	A flat and dry type of bread, containing mostly rye flour. Crispbreads are lightweight and keep fresh for a very long time due to their lack of water.
Lavash		Armenia	Traditional staple food of Armenian cuisine - soft thin bread. In 2014, lavash, the preparation, meaning and appearance of traditional bread as an expression of culture in Armenia was inscribed into the UNESCO Representative List of the Intangible Cultural Heritage of Humanity.
Naan		Mesopotamia	A leavened flatbread that is commonly eaten in the Indian subcontinent and has a chewy texture. Naan is made of white flour, yeast, eggs, milk, salt, and sugar and baked in a tandoor. Its typical tear-drop shape is achieved by the way the dough droops as it cooks on the tandoor walls.
Open sandwich		Various	One slice of bread with one or more toppings. Examples: Smørrebrød (Denmark, Norway), Butterbrot (Germany), Buterbrod (Russia, Ukraine) and Obložené chlebíčky (Czech Republic, Slovenia).
Pão de queijo		Brazil	Literally translated as cheese bread, pão de queijo originated from the culinary inventions of African slaves. The bread is made by rolling starch from the cassava plant into balls and baked with cheese and milk.
Pirozhki		Russia	Baked or fried yeast-leavened boat-shaped buns with a variety of fillings. The fillings are typically stuffed into the bread dough before baking. Like the pirozhki, there are various types of bread rolls flavored or dressed with fillings in Asian cuisine. Examples: Melonpan, Karepan, Anpan (Japan), Bo Lo Bao (Hong Kong) and Custard Bun (Singapore).
Pita bread		Middle East	Yeast-leavened round flatbread baked from wheat flour, common in the Mediterranean, Levant, and neighboring areas. Pita bread or chips are often served with hummus in the Middle East.
Pizza		Naples, Italy	Flat bread with meat, vegetable and/or cheese toppings. Pizza is often eaten as pizza by the slice, "mini pizza" or "pizza baguette," and is often sold by the slice or by weight. This popular snack knows variations around the world.
Plyushka		Russia	Bread made into various shapes with sugar or cinnamon on top.
Pretzel, soft	Philadelphia-style soft pretzel	German and Italian communities, United States	Traditional bakery products that are characterized by their unique texture resembling a chewy bread.
Sandwich		Various	A snack typically consisting of two or more slices of bread with one or more fillings between them. Tea sandwich (United Kingdom) is a sandwich where the crust has been removed.
Slider		United States	A snack sized version of the burger with a variety of fillings.
Stollen		Germany	A cake-like fruit bread made with yeast, water and flour, and usually with zest added to the dough. Candied orange and citrus peels, raisins and almonds, and various spices such as cardamom and cinnamon are added.

=== Cheese ===
Name	Image	Origin	Description
American cheese		United States	A processed cheese from the U.S. American cheese was originally only white, but is now sometimes modified to be yellow-colored. Today it is typically manufactured from a set of ingredients such as milk, whey, milkfat, milk protein concentrate, whey protein concentrate, and salt.
Cheese		Various	A generic term for a diverse group of milk-based food products. Pictured is a plate of assorted cheeses.
Cream cheese		United States	A soft, usually mild-tasting fresh cheese made from milk and cream.
Korbáčiky		Orava, Slovakia	A type of string cheese.
Oaxaca cheese		Mexico	A semi-hard string cheese.
Obatzda		Bavaria	A cheese delicacy.
Parmesan cheese		Italy	A hard, granular cheese produced from cows' milk and aged at least 12 months. It has been called King of cheeses.
Processed cheese		Switzerland	Also called "cheese food"; a food product made from normal cheese and sometimes other unfermented dairy ingredients, plus emulsifiers, extra salt, food colorings, or whey.
String cheese		United States	Snack-sized servings of low-moisture mozzarella.

=== Chips/crisps ===
Name	Image	Origin	Description
Arare		Japan	A type of bite-sized Japanese cracker made from glutinous rice and flavored with soy sauce.
Banana chips or Chifle		Southeast Asia and Americas respectively	Deep-fried and/or dried slices of bananas/plantains. They can be covered with sugar or honey and have a sweet taste, or they can be fried in oil and spices and have a salty and/or spicy taste.
Bombay mix		United Kingdom and Ireland	Bombay mix is the name used in the United Kingdom and Ireland for a traditional Indian snack known as chiwda, chevdo, bhuso (if made without potato), chevda or chivdo in India, or Chanāchura in Odisha and chanachur in Bengal. It consists of a variable mixture of spicy dried ingredients, which may include fried lentils, peanuts, chickpea flour noodles, corn, vegetable oil, chickpeas, flaked rice, fried onion and curry leaves.
Cereal		United States	A food made from processed grains that is often eaten cold, usually mixed with milk (e.g. cow's milk, soy milk, rice milk, almond milk), juice, water, or yogurt, sugar, and sometimes fruit, but may be eaten dry.
Cheese puff		United States	A puffed corn snack, coated with a mixture of cheese or cheese-flavored powders.
Corn chips		United States	A cornmeal snack that is fried in oil or baked.
Corn nuts		United States	A snack food made of roasted or deep-fried corn kernels.
Cracker nuts		Japan	A snack food produced with peanuts that are coated in a wheat flour dough and then fried or deep-fried
Multi-grain snacks		United States	Chips made from grains that have been fried such as Sun Chips (pictured).
Murukku		India	A snack made with rice flour and chickpea flour, and deep fried.
Nachos		Mexico	Fried corn tortillas covered with melted cheddar cheese, pickled jalapeño peppers, and other toppings.
Pita chips		United States	Pita Bread cut into wedges or chips, that are oiled, seasoned, and baked until crispy.
Popcorn		Mexico	A snack based on a variety of corn kernel which expands and puffs up when heated.
Pork rind			Pork skin, raw or fried
Potato chips		United States	A thin slice of potato (or a thin deposit of potato paste) that has been deep fried, baked, or air fried until crunchy.
Prawn/fish crackers		Indonesia	A deep-fried snack made from starch and prawn or fish.
Pretzel, hard		Germany	Made from dough that is commonly shaped into a knot and baked hard to withstand a long shelf life. Pocky (Japan) are a kind of pretzel stick.
Sev mamra		India	A mixture of spicy dry ingredients such as puffed rice, savory noodles and peanuts.
Snack mix		United States	Refers to multiple types of snack items sold in supermarkets such as Chex Mix (pictured).
Tortilla chips		Mexico	Wedges of fried corn tortillas; originated in Mexico; first produced commercially in Los Angeles, California, United States

=== Crackers/biscuits ===
Name	Image	Origin	Description
Animal cracker		England	A small cracker or cookie baked in the shape of an animal, usually an animal one might see at a zoo. The most common variety is light-colored and slightly sweet, but darker chocolate-flavored and colorful frosted varieties are also manufactured.
Bagel chips		United States	Small rounds sliced from bagels which are bread rolls with a dense, chewy, doughy interior and crispy exterior.
Barquillos		Europe	A batter of flour, eggs and other ingredients is cooked in a mold, re-shaped over heat and crisped-up upon cooling. The biscuits are known variously as barquillos (Spain), love letters (Hong Kong) and kue semprong (Indonesia).
Center-filled crackers		Japan	These are small cracker biscuits with a crunchy crust and a sweet, creamy interior. The Hello Panda (Japan) branded crackers were created in 1979. Other variations: Monaca (South Korea) cracker is made from rice flour with a pumpkin filing.
Crackers		United States	A flat, dry baked biscuit typically made with flour, possibly flavored with herbs and spices before baking. Crackers are often branded as a nutritious and convenient way to consume a staple food or cereal grain. While cookies are made from a soft dough resulting in a larger, softer and chunkier end product, the biscuit is twice-baked using a harder dough.
Graham crackers		United States	Invented in Bound Brook, New Jersey by Sylvester Graham. The original graham cracker was made with graham flour, a combination of finely-ground unbleached-wheat flour with the wheat bran and germ coarsely-ground and added back in providing nutrition and flavor.
Hardtack		England	Hardtack (sometimes known colloquially as military dog biscuit) is a type of dense biscuit or cracker issued as provision or ration in the absence of perishable food. It is baked extra hard to withstand a longer shelf life, as may be needed during emergencies, long voyages or military campaigns.
Kuih cincin		Brunei and Sabah, Malaysia	Made from wheat and rice flour, palm sugar, and maltose or honey.
Maltose crackers		Hong Kong	A popular traditional food in Hong Kong, consisting of maltose syrup sandwiched between two saltine crackers.
Oyster cracker		United States	Small, salted crackers, often served with oyster stew and clam chowder and have a flavor similar to saltine crackers.
Rice cracker		East Asia	It is an East Asian cracker made from rice flour such as Senbei (Japan). They are fried or baked and often puffed and/or brushed with soy sauce or vinegar to create a smooth texture.
Rusk		South Africa	A hard, dry biscuit or a twice-baked bread, sometimes used as a teether for babies. Ouma Rusks, first produced by Elizabeth Ann Greyvensteyn in Eastern Cape in 1939, are known to pair well with a warm beverage.
Soda cracker		United States	A thin, usually square, cracker, made from white flour, sometimes yeast (although many are yeast free), and baking soda, with most varieties lightly sprinkled with coarse salt. Also known as saltine.
Wafer		Western Europe	A crispy, often sweet, very thin, flat, light biscuit that originated from the ninth century of Western Europe. Some popular chocolate snacks, such as Kit Kat and Coffee Crisp, are wafers enclosed by an outer layer of chocolate.
Water biscuit		United States	A type of savory cracker that are thin, hard and brittle, usually served with cheese or wine. Originally produced in the 19th century as a version of ship's biscuit and continued to be popular in several countries.

=== Meat-based ===
Name	Image	Origin	Description
Bacon			A cured meat prepared from a pig, bacon is prepared from several different cuts of meat.
Biltong		South Africa	Spiced and air-dried beef, a popular snack during rugby games
Çiğ köfte		Turkey	Middle Eastern raw meatball dish
Corn dog		United States	A hot dog skewered on a stick, dipped in corn batter and deep-fried. Commonly eaten during fairs.
Dried cuttlefish			Seafood product
Dried fish			Fish preserved by drying
Dried squid			
Fish such as fried fish			Gill-bearing non-tetrapod aquatic vertebrates
Hot dogs			Sausage in a bun
Jerky			Dried lean meat strips
Kibbeh nayyeh			Levantine mezze
Omelet			Egg dish
Oysters (canned)			Variety of families of Mollusca
Pickled herring			Traditional way of preserving herring
Soused herring			Dish of raw herring pickled in vinegar

=== Pasta and Noodles ===
Name	Image	Origin	Description
Instant noodles		Japan	A type of food consisting of noodles sold in a precooked and dried block with flavoring powder and/or seasoning oil. Dried noodle blocks are designed to be cooked or soaked in boiling water before eating. Momofuku Ando of Nissin Foods, Japan invented instant noodles in 1958 and cup noodles in 1971. The cup noodles are designed to be prepared directly in the cup.
Pasta		Italy	Pictured is cavatappi with pesto.
Ramen		Japan	A Japanese noodle dish that consists of Chinese-style wheat noodles served in a meat- or (occasionally) fish-based broth, often flavored with soy sauce or miso, and uses toppings such as sliced pork, chāshū, dried seaweed, nori, kamaboko, green onions, and occasionally corn.
Yakisoba		Japan	A stir-fried dish of soba noodles made from buckwheat flour, often found as a snack food during Japanese festivals.

=== Paste Foods ===
Name	Image	Origin	Description
Curry		India	A sauce dish seasoned with spices, mainly associated with South Asian cuisine. Ingredients include coconut cream or coconut milk, dairy cream or yogurt, or legume purée, sautéed crushed onion, or tomato purée. In the Indian subcontinent, curry is eaten with roti or naan as a scoop. Pictured: Mattae Paneer (tomato gravy, peas and cottage cheese) and dal (pigeon peas and veggies) curries, and mint chutney.
Hummus		Lebanon	A Middle Eastern dip, spread, or savory dish made from cooked, mashed chickpeas blended with tahini, lemon juice, and garlic. Pictured is hummus with pine nuts and olive oil.
Instant soup		Japan	Packaged soup stock that can be readily reconstituted from dry or paste ingredients (e.g. miso) into soup by adding hot water.
Jam		Greece	Preparations of fruits whose main preserving agent is sugar and sometimes acid, often stored in glass jars and used as a condiment or spread.
Taro paste		Chaoshan, China	Yam paste, or Orh Nee 潮式芋泥 is a classic Teochew dessert. It is typically served warm and topped off with ginkgo nuts and steamed pumpkin, with an (optional) trace of coconut milk.
Tongsui		Lingnan, China	Tongsui 糖水, literarily translated as sweet soup, are made from a grounded ingredient, which can be nuts, seeds or beans. The soups are highly viscous, such as black sesame soup, peanut paste soup and almond paste soup.
Yogurt		Turkey	Yogurt is a highly viscous liquid in its original form and at room temperature. It is a food produced by the bacterial fermentation of milk. The tart flavor comes from the lactic acid produced by bacteria. Pictured: Greek yogurt with honey.

== See also ==
- Junk food
- List of Indian snacks
- List of Indonesian snacks
- List of Japanese snacks
- List of pastries
- List of snack foods by country
- List of street foods
- Moroccan cuisine
- Snacking

== Bibliography ==
- Booth, R. Gordon (editor) (1990). Snack Food. Springer. ISBN 0442237456
- Burtea, O (2001). "Snack Foods from Formers and High-Shear Extruders". In Lusas EW; Rooney LW (eds.). Snack Foods Processing. CRC Press. p. 287. ISBN 1-56676-932-9.
- Croll, Elisabeth (2006). China's New Consumers: Social Development and Domestic Demand. Routledge. ISBN 0203967054
- Hu, Frank (2008). Obesity Epidemiology. Oxford University Press. ISBN 0199718474
- Lusas, Edmund W. Lusas; Rooney, Lloyd W. (editors) (2001). Snack Foods Processing CRC Press. ISBN 1420012541
- Reineccius, Gary (2005). Flavor Chemistry and Technology, Second Edition. CRC Press. p 405. ISBN 0203485343
- Tull, Anita (2012). Food Technology: An Introduction. Oxford University Press. Pages 40–41. ISBN 0198328192
