= Snack mix =

Snack foods containing multiple snack items

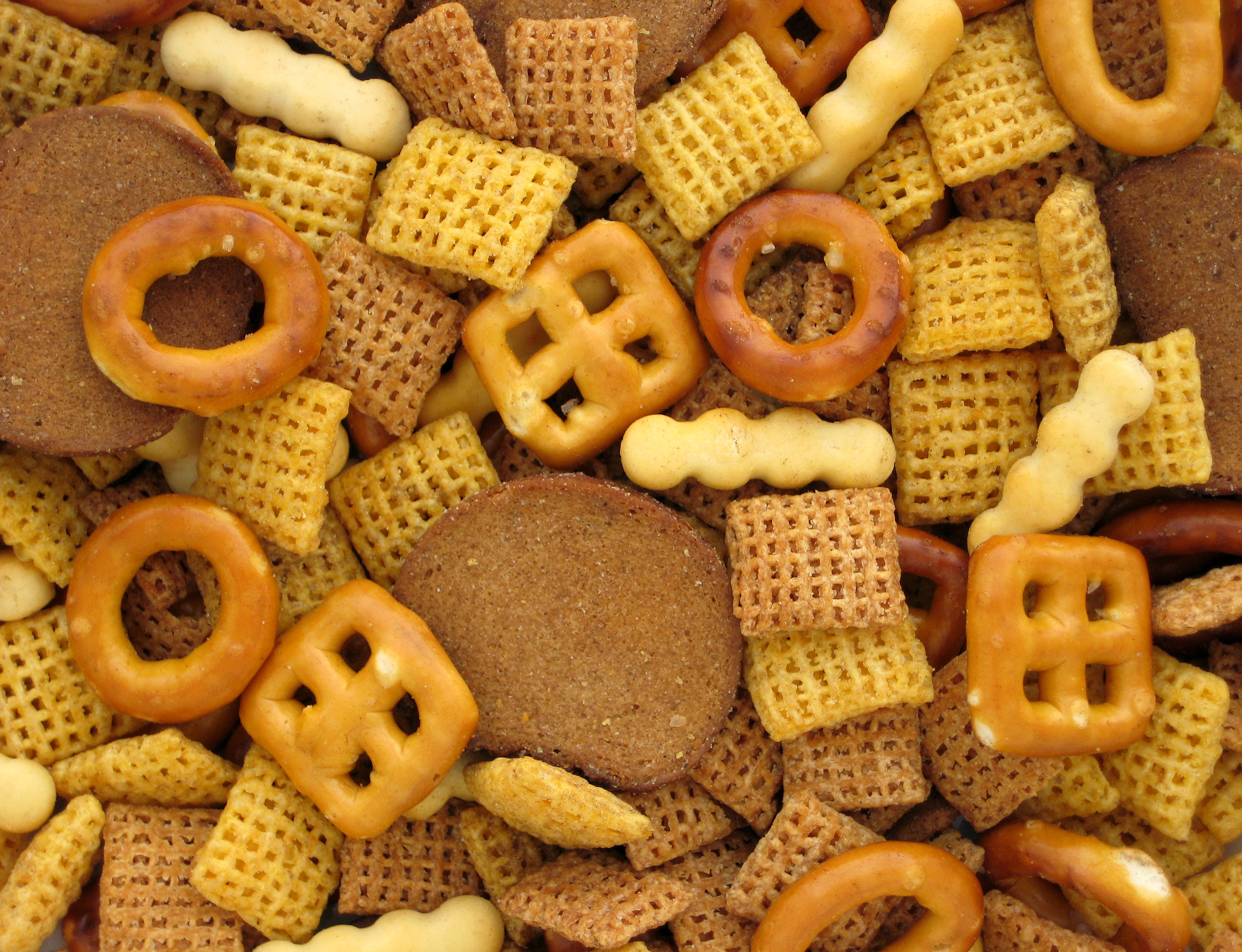
Chex Mix

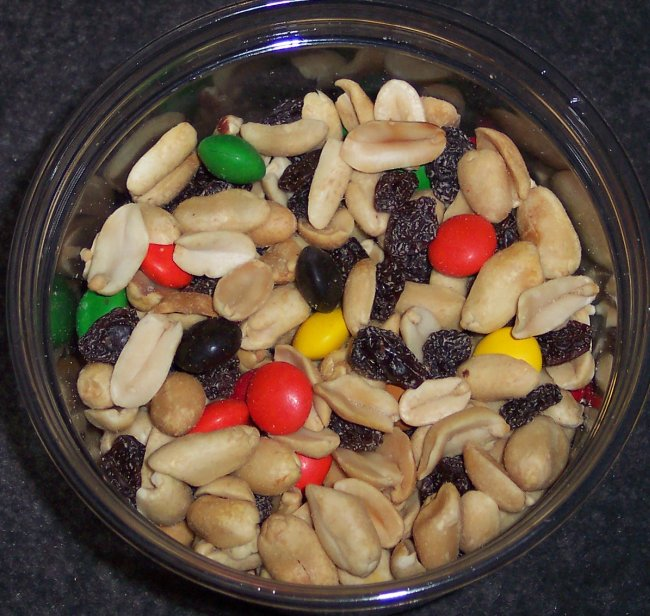
"Gorp" is a trail mix made with peanuts, raisins and M&M's

Snack mix is a subset of snack foods consisting of multiple snack items. Popular snack mixes are as follows:

- Bridge mix – Nuts, raisins (or other dried fruit), and candy, all covered in chocolate.
- Chex Mix – Rice, corn and/or wheat Chex, peanuts, pretzels, and usually bagel chips. Chex cereal was introduced in 1937 by Ralston Purina.
- Gardetto's – Bread sticks, rye chips, and pretzels made by General Mills, owner of the similar Chex Mix.
- Munchies – A prepackaged snack mix made by and with Frito-Lay products such as Doritos, Cheetos, Rold Gold Pretzels, and Sun Chips.
- Trail mix – These generally contain granola, raisins, nuts, and chocolate chips or M&M's Popular brands include Planters Nuts And Chocolate Trail Mix (from KraftHeinz), and Kirkland Signature Trail Mix (from Costco Wholesale).
- Tropical Fruit Snack Mix – Dried pineapples, dried papayas, dried mangos, dried apples, dried bananas and raisins.
- Bombay mix, also known by other names (saloonia, chiwda, chevdo, bhuso, chevda, or chivdo), a spicy mix of dry ingredients originating in Indian cuisine
- Tex Mex mix, including nuts, dried chili, and crunchy corn-based sticks

== See also ==
- List of snack foods
- Snacking
