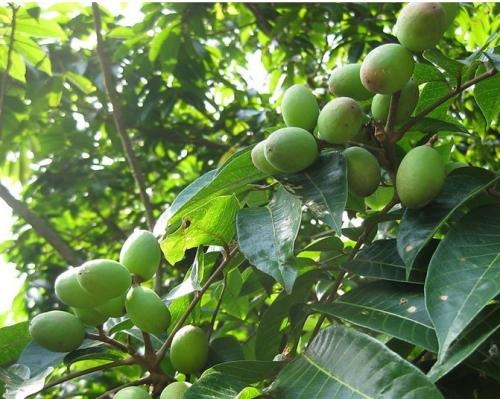
- Canarium album leaves and fruit

Conservation status
- Least Concern (IUCN 3.1)

Scientific classification
- Kingdom: Plantae
- Clade: Embryophytes
- Clade: Tracheophytes
- Clade: Angiosperms
- Clade: Eudicots
- Clade: Rosids
- Order: Sapindales
- Family: Burseraceae
- Genus: Canarium
- Species: C. album

Binomial name
- Canarium album (Lour.) Raeusch. ex DC.

Synonyms
- Canarium album Raeusch. [Invalid]; Canarium album Leenh.; Canarium tonkinense Engl.; Hearnia balansae C.DC.; Pimela alba Lour.

= Canarium album =

Species of tree

Canarium album is a species of flowering plant in the family Burseraceae native in Cambodia, China, Singapore, Laos, and Vietnam. The Catalogue of Life does not record any sub-species. It produces an edible fruit commonly called Chinese olive or white olive (though it has no relation to Oleaceae let alone Olea) in those countries. (Note: known in Vietnamese: trám trắng, quả trám for the fruit; Thai: สมอจีน samo chin or กาน้า kana; simplified Chinese: 橄榄; traditional Chinese: 橄欖; Pe̍h-ōe-jī: káⁿ-ná; pinyin: gǎnlǎn; Malay: buah kana)

It is mostly cultivated in Thailand, but has also been spread on a smaller scale to Fiji and northern Queensland in Australia.

== Uses ==
=== Culinary ===
The pulp of the tree's fruit and its seeds are edible, with a strong resinous flavor when they are fresh. Culinary oil can be extracted from the seed. Preserves can be made with the fruit, both sweet like jam or liquorice olives, or pickled preserves.

In China, a pickle called olive vegetable (Note: simplified Chinese: 橄榄菜; traditional Chinese: 橄欖菜; pinyin: gǎnlǎn cài) made from a mix of Canarium album fruit and mustard greens, is commonly used as a flavoring for congee and fried rice, with Teochew people specifically being very fond of the pickle.

Among the Teochew, it is custom in the Chinese New Year to keep these "olives" (which they call 珍果 diêng^{1} guê^{2} lit. 'precious nut' or 檳榔 bing^{1} lang^{5} 'betel nuts') in a compartment of a traditional candy box: it was said to harken back to the Teochew's habits of chewing betel nut like the people in the neighbouring home regions during the Ming dynasty, but given up by late Qing dynasty or early Republican period where they consumed green olives as a substitute. From then on, eating "olives", both green and black, become a custom among the Teochew.

=== Other ===
Its fruit, resin and seed are exported to Europe where they are used in the manufacture of varnish and soap.

== Gallery ==
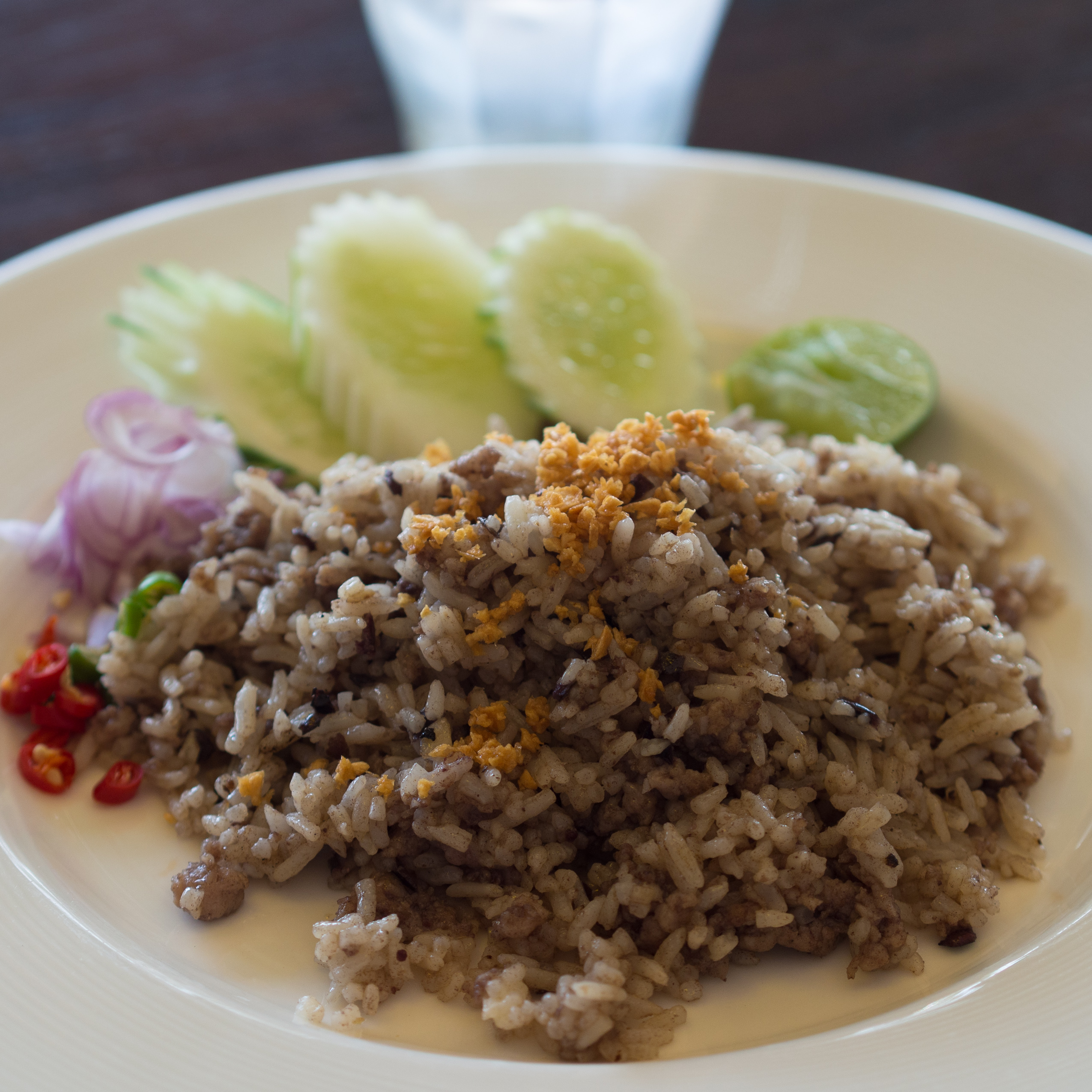
Khao phat nam liap dish (with rice) from Thailand

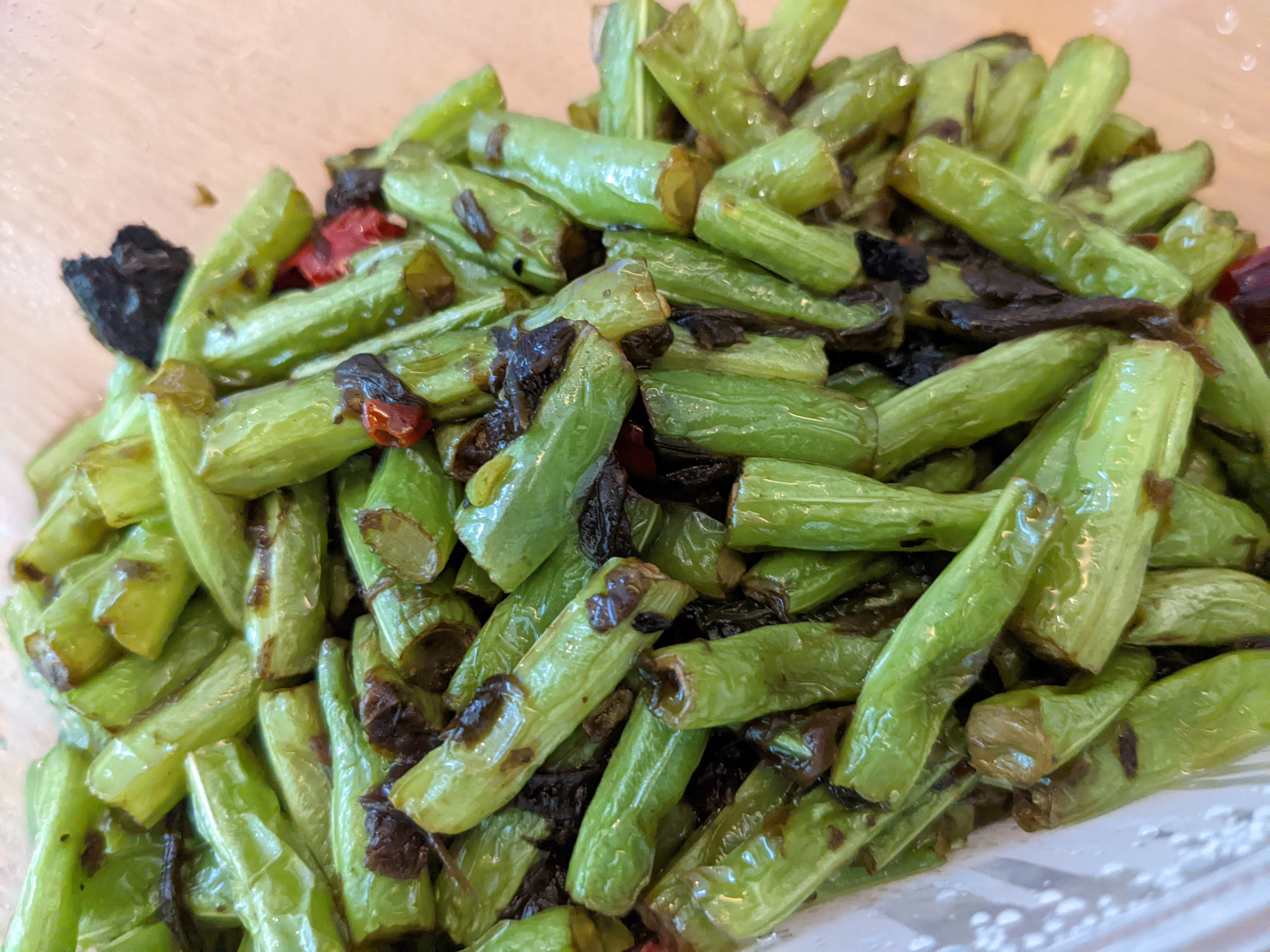
Hunanese stir-fry of green beans with olive vegetable
