= Bridge mix =

Snack mix or candy consisting of nuts, fruits, and "cremes"

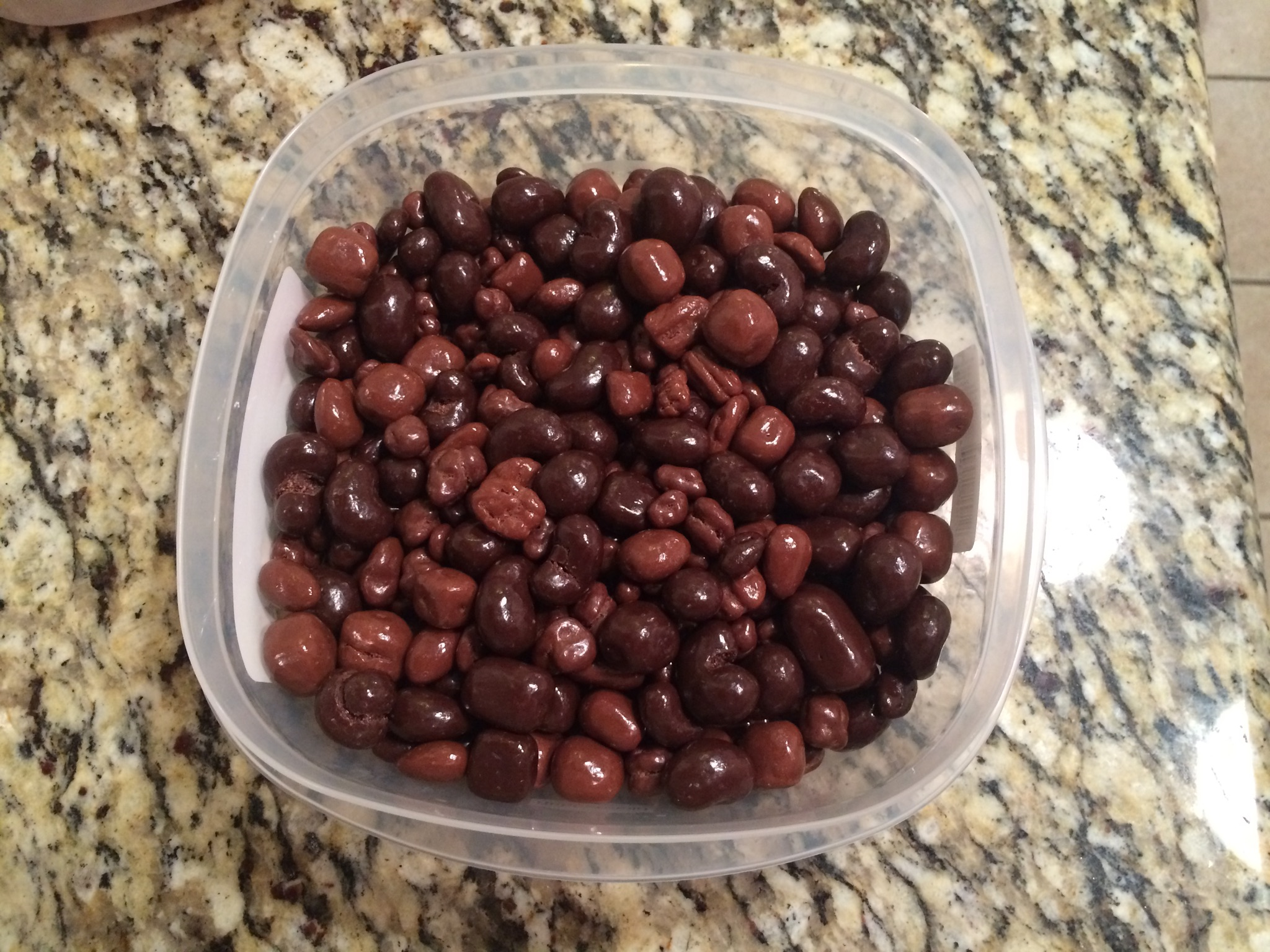
- A plastic bowl of bridge mix
- Alternative names: Grand Slam mix
- Type: Confectionery
- Main ingredients: Nuts, fruits, chocolate

Bridge mix or grand slam mix is a type of snack mix or candy consisting of nuts, fruits, and "cremes" covered in milk and dark chocolate. Some common ingredients in bridge mix include peanuts, almonds, raisins, macadamia nuts, malted milk balls, fruits, and nougats.

Brach's is one of the major US producers of bridge mix. Hershey Canada sells it under the name "Bridge Mixture."

Bridge mix may have been named for the card game bridge, since bridge tournaments are known for providing dishes of candy and snacks at the game tables. Alternatively, See's Bridge Mix may have begun as rejected candy bits that were pulled from "the bridge," a mechanical conveyor belt.

== Hershey Canada's product ==
Hershey Canada's Bridge Mixture is sold in yellow boxes of 52 grams, 105 grams and 130 grams, or bags of 290 and 340 grams. The mixture includes candies coated in both milk and dark chocolate. As of 2022, the packages do not bear the Hershey logo and the product is not mentioned on the Hershey Canada website. The fine print indicates that the product is "Manufactured by Hershey Canada Inc." The slogan for the candy is "a delicious assortment of coated confectionery."

The mixture formerly included mint, orange, and Irish-creme-flavored pieces coated in dark chocolate; and peanuts, raisins, caramels, and Turkish delight coated in milk chocolate. In 2022, Hershey removed the mint, orange, Irish cream, caramels and Turkish delight, while adding 20% more peanuts to the bag.

== Trademark ==
The Canadian "Bridge Mixture" trademark is owned by Hershey Canada Inc. It was first registered in 1951, by the Walter M. Lowney Company, and first used in 1935. The Lowney logo remains on the packaging under Hershey's manufacturing.
