= Chex Mix =

Snack mix

- Product type: Snack mix
- Current owner: General Mills
- Introduced: 1952 (original Chex Party Mix Recipe); 1985 (Commercial Version)
- Previous owners: Ralston
- Website: www.chexmix.com

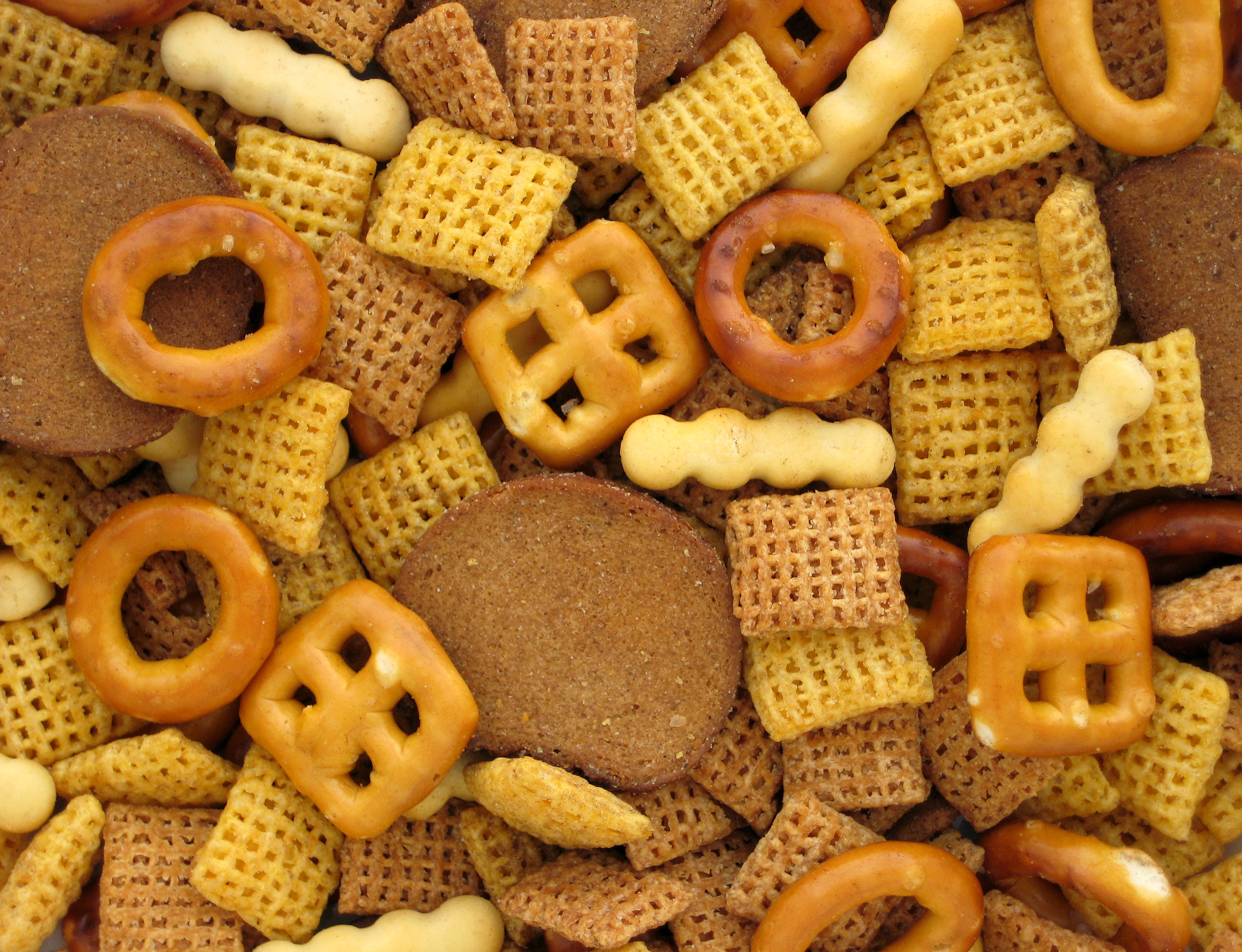
Commercial Chex Mix

Chex Mix (stylized as Chex mix) is a type of snack mix that includes Chex breakfast cereal (sold by General Mills) as a major component.

There are many recipes (often printed on Chex cereal boxes) for homemade Chex Mix, also known as Chex Party Mix, which predates the commercial version by thirty years. Though contents vary, the mixes generally include an assortment of Chex cereals, chips, hard breadsticks, pretzels, nuts or bagel bites. There are also commercially sold pre-made varieties of Chex Mix sold by the maker of Chex Cereals.

In Canada, where Chex is not available, a homemade version is known as nuts and bolts.

== History of Chex Party Mix ==
Wheat Chex cereal was introduced in 1937 and Rice Chex in 1950 by Ralston Purina.

In 1952 an advertisement for Chex party mix appeared in Life Magazine with a recipe that included Wheat and Rice Chex.

In 1958 Corn Chex was introduced and added to the recipe. However, it was not until 1985 that pre-packaged products were introduced commercially by Ralston Purina and the trademarks registered to it.

=== "Original Chex Party Mix" ===
This refers to the official recipe on the box of chex cereal. The recipe for the "Original chex party mix" has changed multiple times over the years. There are recipes from the 1960s, 1970s and 1980s that differ from the current "Original Chex Party Mix".

=== Advertising ===
In the late 1980s and early 1990s, Charlie Brown and the Peanuts gang were used in animated TV commercials to promote Chex Party mix. In August 1996, General Mills acquired the Chex product line from Ralston Purina along with other brands.

=== Homemade Chex Mix ===
There are a number of recipes for homemade Chex mix including recipes on the Chex cereal boxes.

== Commercial contents and varieties ==
All commercial Chex Mixes contain some form of Chex cereal. Other ingredients generally include rye chips, bagel chips, breadsticks, pretzels, nuts, and crackers. In total, General Mills produces 13 varieties of Chex Mixes, not including limited editions. These flavors can be broadly divided into three categories: savory, chocolate (usually marketed as "Muddy Buddies"), and sweet 'n salty. Sometimes, limited edition varieties of Chex Mix are released. Past examples of these include Winter Chex Mix Cocoa and Summer Chex Mix Ranch. In 2009, two new flavors, Spicy Szechuan, and Teriyaki were introduced and made available exclusively at convenience stores.

=== Savory ===
- Traditional
- Cheddar
- Buffalo Ranch (discontinued)
- Spicy Dill
- Bold
- Sour Cream & Onion
- Peanut Lover's (discontinued)
- Hot 'n Spicy (discontinued; reintroduced in 2025)
- Jalapeño Cheddar
- Chipotle Cheddar (discontinued)
- White Cheddar
- Italian Herb & Parmesan (discontinued)
- Cherry & Crunchy Nuts (discontinued)
- Xtreme Sweet and Spicy Sriracha (discontinued)
- Xtreme Habanero Lime (discontinued)
- Ghost Pepper (discontinued)
- Honey BBQ
- Salsa (discontinued)
- Remix Cheesy Pizza
- Remix Zesty Taco
- Remix Buffalo Sandwich

=== Sweet 'n salty ===
- Caramel Crunch (discontinued)
- Honey Nut
- Trail Mix (discontinued)
- Malted Mix (discontinued)

=== Sweet ===
- Turtle
- Dark Chocolate (discontinued)
- Peanut Butter Chocolate (discontinued)
- Brownie Supreme (discontinued)
- Snickerdoodle (discontinued)
- Cookies & Cream (discontinued)

=== Seasons ===
- Ranch (Summer) (discontinued)
- Cocoa (Winter) (discontinued)

== See also ==
- Bombay Mix
- Gardetto's
- List of brand name snack foods
- Munchies
