= Airplane olive =

Popular snack in Southern China

Airplane olives (traditional Chinese: 甘草欖 or 飛機欖; simplified Chinese: 甘草榄 or 飞机榄; pinyin: Gān Cǎo Lǎn or Fēi Jī Lǎn), also known as liquorice olive or Chinese olive, is a traditional and popular snack in Hong Kong and Guangzhou. The snack is made from pickled Chinese olives (Canarium album and/or Canarium pimela) flavoured with liquorice, salt and various herbs, and has the appearance of a dark-green paste covered in oil, having an umami flavour and a silky but layered texture. The name "airplane olive" originates in the 1950s–1970s, from a custom of street vendors throwing the snack to customers above to their homes, commonly tong lau, who would then throw money down for payment. As tong lau across Hong Kong were replaced with newer buildings, this custom has gradually vanished. The man who created the airplane olive was named "Uncle Kei", nicknamed "Mr. Airplane Olive" for his invention of this street food. Nowadays, this street food can be found in shops on Hau Wong Road, Kowloon City.
