= Trail mix =

Type of snack

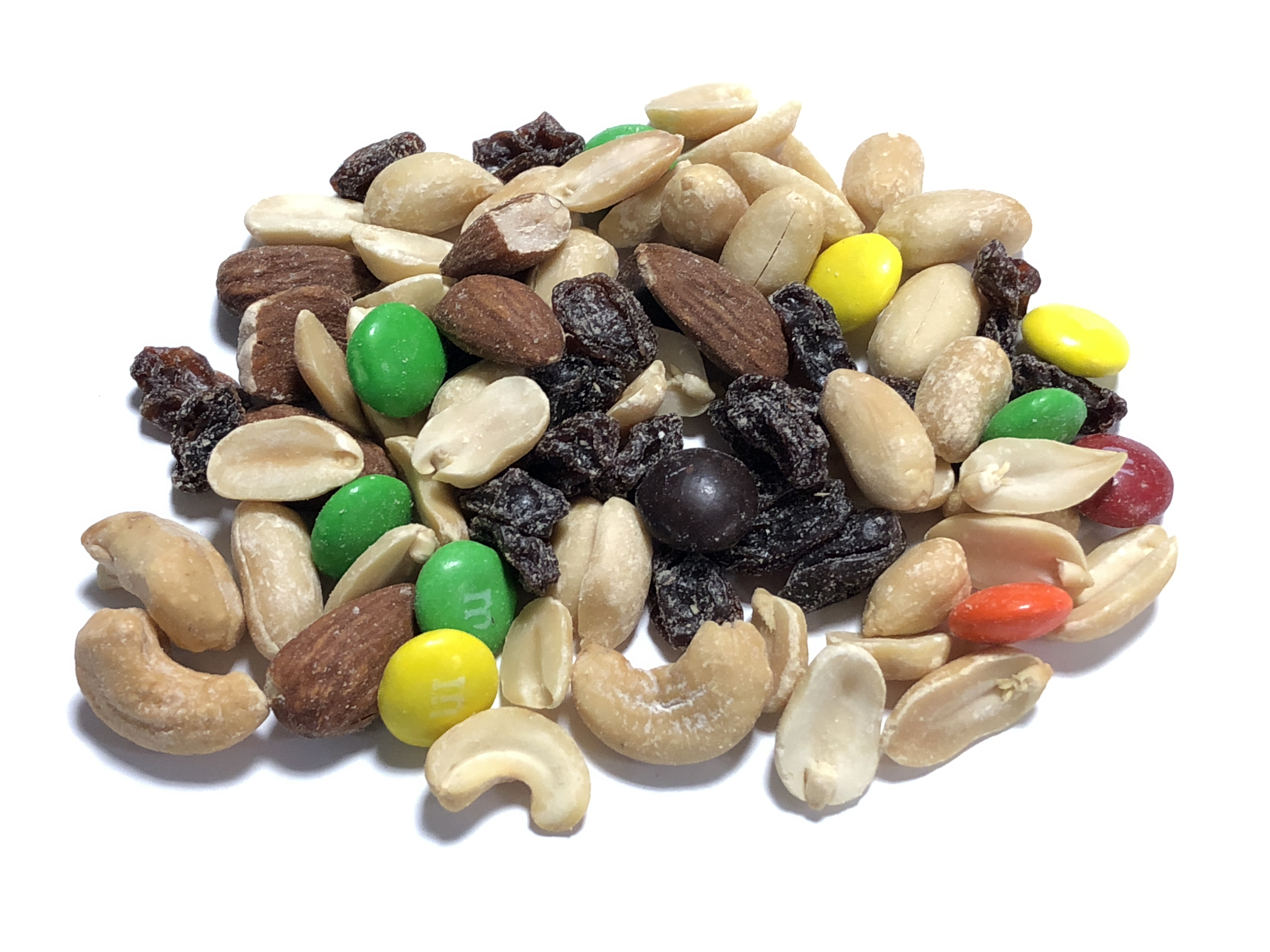
- Trail mix made with peanuts, raisins, almonds, cashew nuts and M&M's
- Alternative names: Gorp, scroggin
- Type: Snack
- Place of origin: United States
- Main ingredients: Dried fruit, grains, nuts, sometimes chocolate

Trail mix is a type of snack mix, typically a combination of granola, dried fruit, nuts, and sometimes candy, developed as food to be taken along on hikes. Trail mix is a popular snack food for hikes, because it is lightweight, easy to store, and nutritious, providing a quick energy boost from the carbohydrates in the dried fruit or granola, and sustained energy from fatty nuts.

The combination of fatty nuts, raisins and chocolate as a trail snack dates at least to the 1910s, when outdoorsman Horace Kephart recommended it in his popular camping guide Camping and Woodcraft.

== Other names ==
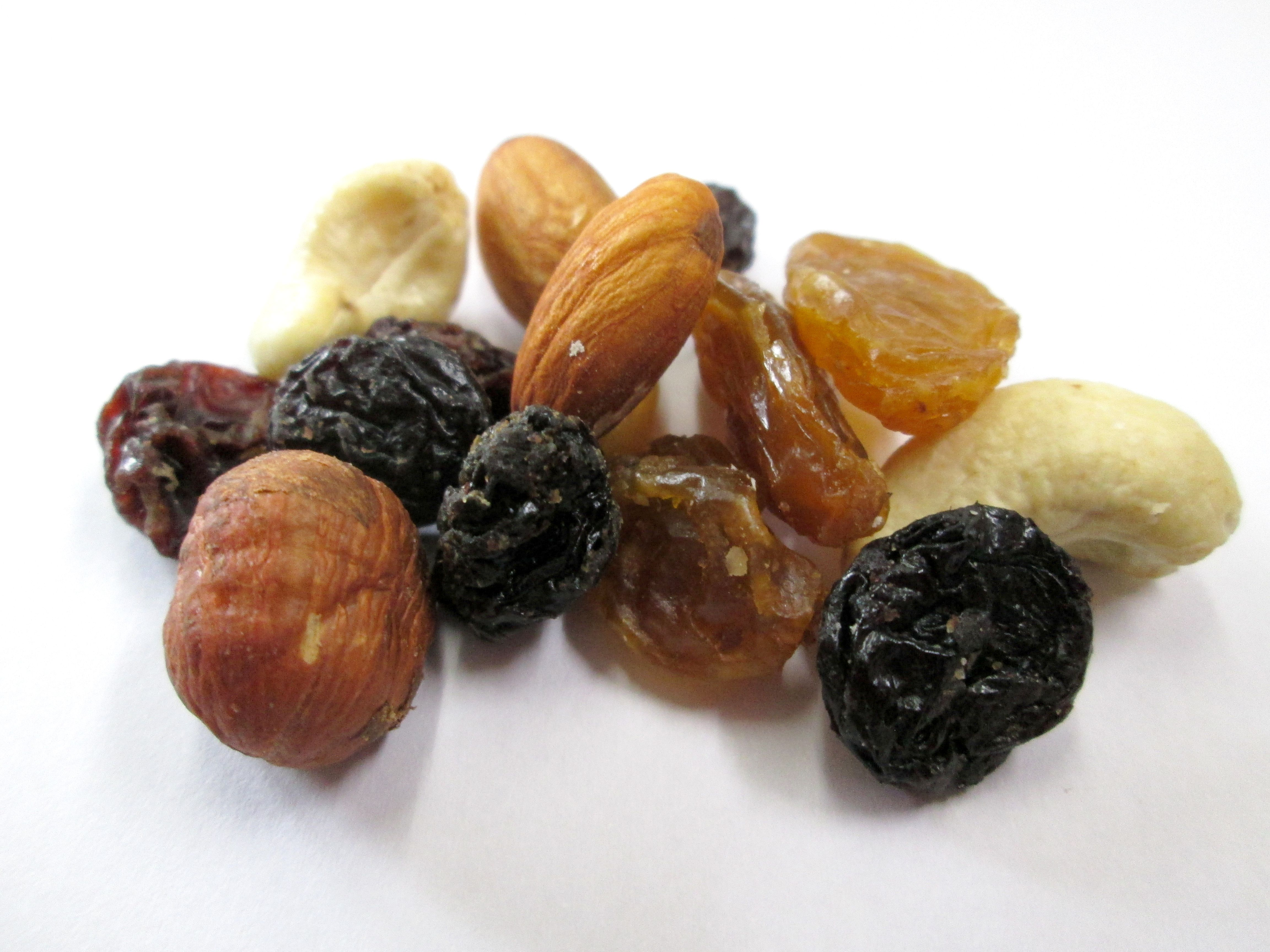
German Studentenfutter (student food)

In New Zealand and Australia, trail mix is known as scroggin.

Gorp is often used by campers and hikers in North America. Some claim it is an acronym for "good ol' raisins and peanuts". The Oxford English Dictionary cites a 1913 reference to the verb gorp, meaning "to eat greedily".

In Germany, Poland, Hungary, the Netherlands, Scandinavia, and several other European countries, trail mix is called student fodder, student oats or student mix. It usually does not include chocolate.

== Ingredients ==
Common ingredients may include:

- Granola
- Breakfast cereals, such as Chex
- Carob chips
- Chocolate candies, such as chocolate chip, chocolate chunks, and M&M's
- Peanut butter chips
- Dried fruits, such as raisins, cranberries, apricots, apples, banana chips, sultanas or candied orange peel
- Crystallized ginger
- Yogurt chips and yogurt covered fruits
- Marshmallows
- Nuts, such as almonds or cashews
- Legumes, such as peanuts or baked soybeans
- Pretzels
- Rye chips
- Seeds, such as pumpkin seeds or sunflower seeds
- Shredded coconut

== Popular mixes ==
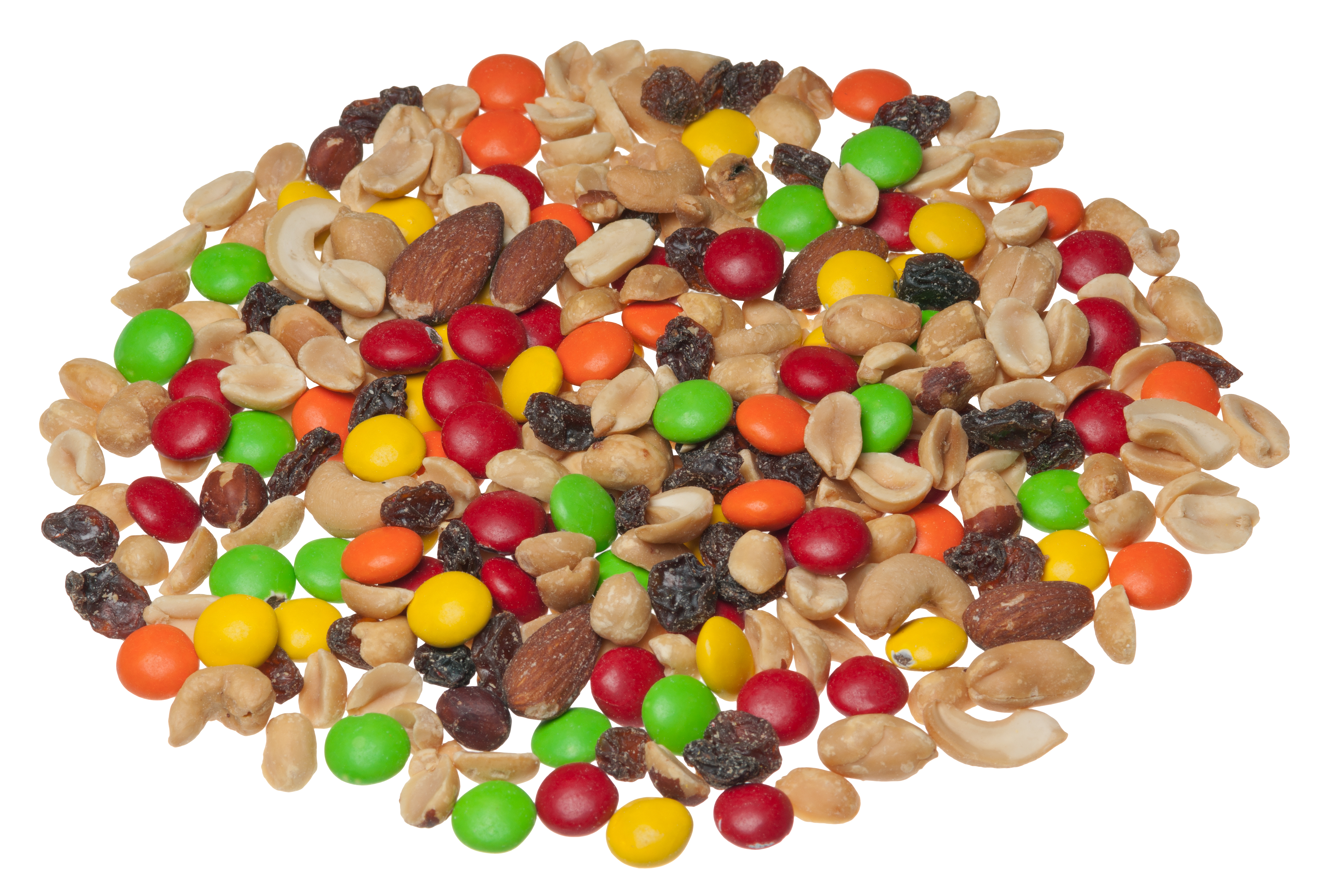
Planters-brand trail mix

There are common trail mix varieties, which can be made at home, or bought pre-mixed from supermarkets by numerous producers.

- Asia mix (sometimes called Zen mix): peanuts, sesame sticks, rice crackers, and soybeans.
- Cape Cod trail mix (sometimes called Northeastern): almonds, cashews, and dried cranberries.
- Hawaiian trail mix (also known as Tropical): peanuts, almonds, pineapple, mango, banana chips, coconut, and cashews.
- Mexican trail mix (also called Sweet and Spicy): mango, sunflower seeds, pepitas, raisins, and chili powder.
- Monster trail mix (or Peanut Butter and Chocolate): peanut butter chips, chocolate chips, peanuts, M&M's, and sometimes either or both raisins and cranberries.
- Omega-3 trail mix: cashews, walnuts, raisins, cinnamon apples pieces.
- Santa Fe trail mix (also known as Southwestern or Hatch): toasted corn, peanuts, pumpkin seeds, pistachios, and New Mexico chile powder.

== See also ==
- Bombay mix
