= Gardetto's =

American snack food brand

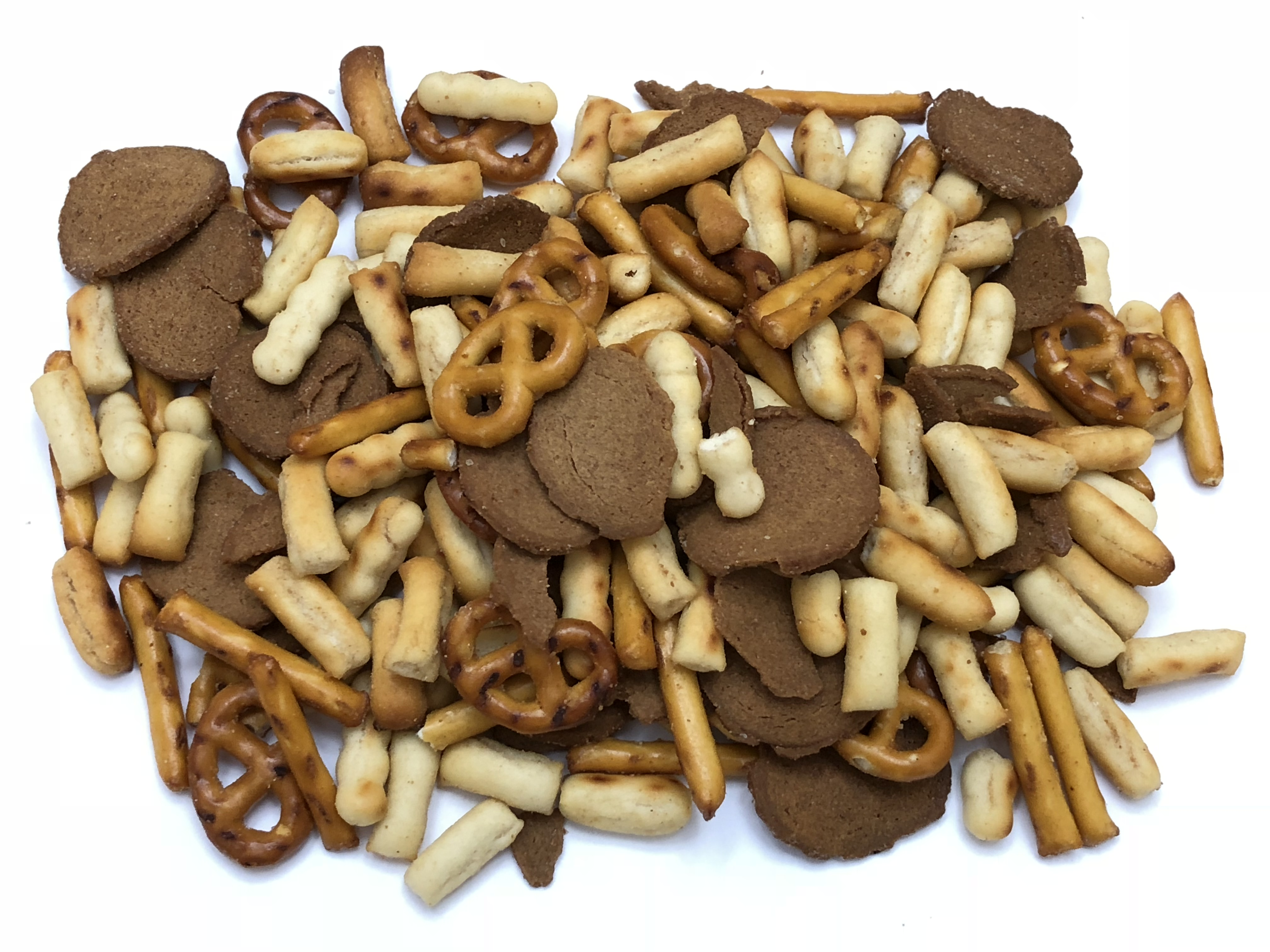
A pile of Gardetto's

Gardetto's is a brand of snack mix owned by General Mills, which also owns the similar Chex Mix. The Gardetto Family Bakery was founded in 1932 in Milwaukee, Wisconsin by Italian immigrants Baptiste and Diane Gardetto. The bakery was acquired by General Mills in 1999. According to the packaging, it was at the bakery that Judy Gardetto took the trimmings of breadsticks and mixed them with other snack bits and a blend of special seasonings.

In 1931, Judy Gardetto began baking breadstick ends marinated in oil, garlic and Worcestershire sauce in her own oven. Her family produced them at the bakery plant and initially sold them as "Gardetto's Snak-Ens" to bars and restaurants in 10-pound bags. Her father added pretzels, rye chips and Chex cereal to the mix and began selling them as "Gardetto's Deluxe Snak-Ens". It was initially marketed to high-end shops in the midwest. In 1987, the company began selling 1.75-oz bags in vending machines, and attributed demand taking off to this decision. The product name was eventually changed to Original Recipe.

Today, Gardetto's is sold in "original" recipe (with changes as noted below) as well as in reduced fat original, Italian recipe, Italian cheese blend, and a deli-style mustard pretzel mix. Gardetto's Mixes do not contain peanuts or traces of tree nuts, but do contain wheat, milk, and soy ingredients.

== Variations ==
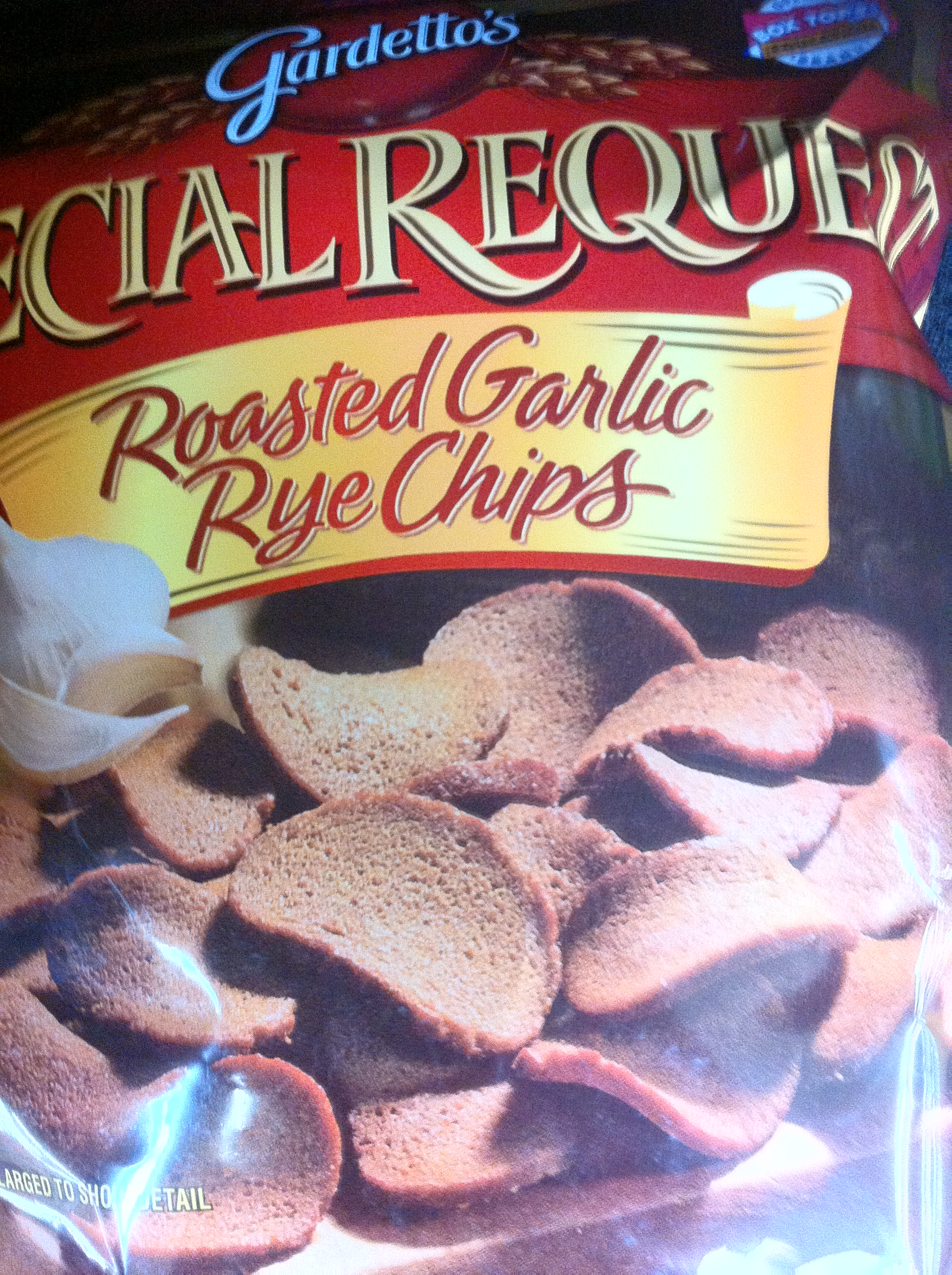
A bag of Gardetto's Special Request Roasted Garlic Rye Chips.

In 2006, Gardetto's released a "special request" snack including only the brown rye chips.

Discontinued varieties include Sour Cream and Onion, and Ranch flavored mixes, both of which replaced the rye toast crackers with spiral cut cracker bits. Pizza Mix was also eliminated after several years of production and later replaced by Italian Recipe.

In early 2013, General Mills removed the sesame seed breadstick from the Gardetto's original recipe and replaced it with a different breadstick found in other popular snack mixes put out by General Mills.
