= Murtabak =

Stuffed pancake with various fillings

Mutabbaq
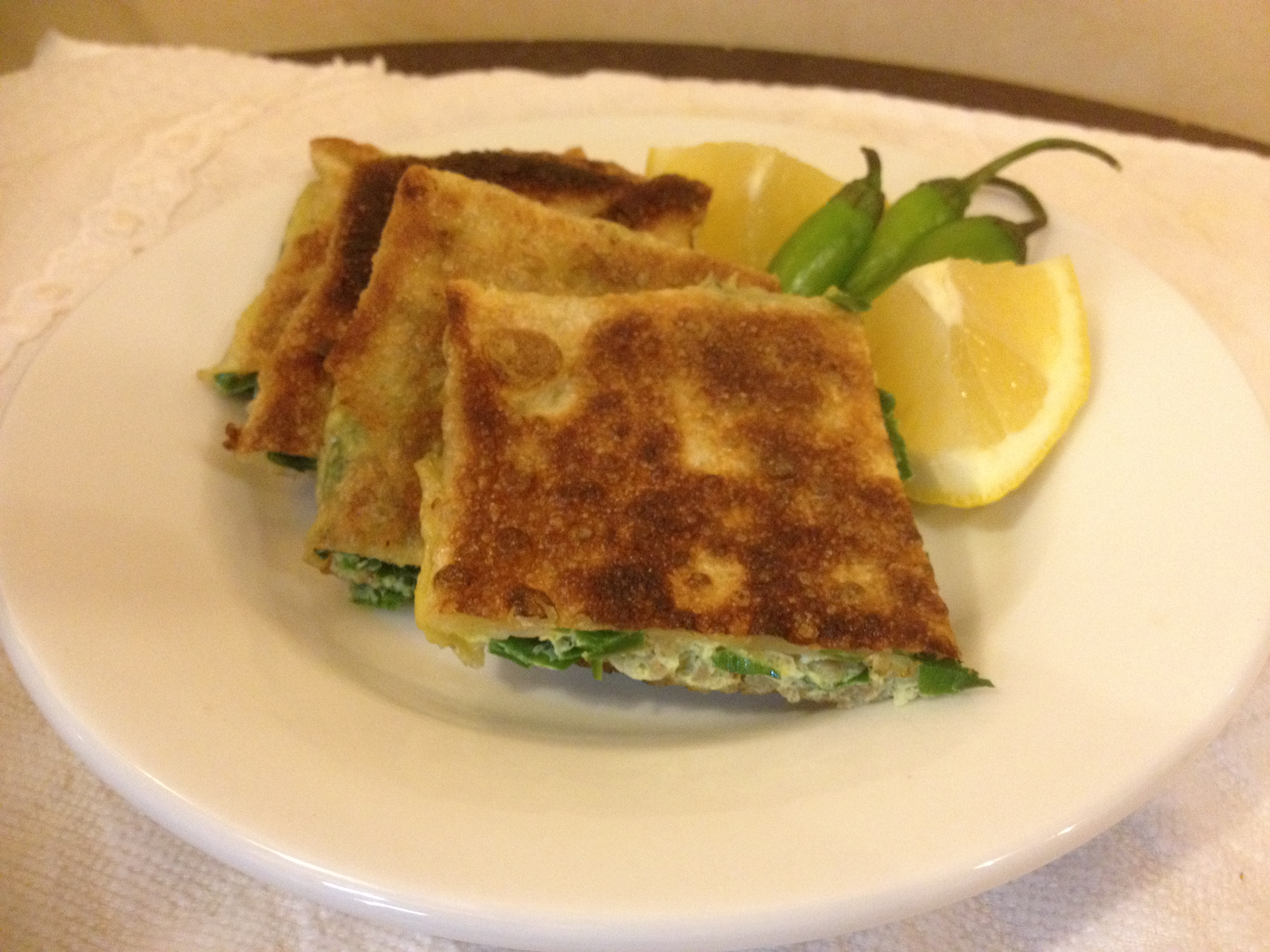
- A murtabak serving
- Alternative names: Murtabak
- Type: Flatbread, pancake
- Course: Starter
- Place of origin: Saudi Arabia and Yemen
- Region or state: Arabian Peninsula, Indian subcontinent, Southeast Asia
- Created by: Arabs in Saudi Arabia and Yemen
- Serving temperature: hot or warm

Murtabak, or mutabbaq (Arabic: مُطَبَّق, romanized: muṭabbaq, lit. 'folded', standard pronunciation: [mu.tˤab.baq]), is a stuffed pancake or pan-fried bread commonly found in the Arabian Peninsula, parts of the Indian subcontinent, and Southeast Asia (especially Maritime Southeast Asia), notably in Saudi Arabia, Yemen, parts of South India, Indonesia, Malaysia, Singapore, Brunei, and Southern Thailand. Depending on the location, the name and ingredients can vary significantly. The name mutabbaq means "folded" in Arabic.

Murtabak is often described as a spicy folded omelette or pancake with bits of vegetables. Its most common form is made from pan-fried crepes, usually stuffed with beaten eggs, chopped leeks, chives, or green onion, and minced meat, which is then folded and cut into squares.

In Malaysia and Singapore, murtabak was originally sold in mamak stalls, and usually includes minced meat (beef or chicken, sometimes goat meat or mutton) along with garlic, egg, and onion, and is eaten with curry, sliced cucumber, syrup-pickled onions, or tomato sauce.

In Indonesia, the term martabak refers to two dishes: martabak manis, based on apam balik, and martabak telur, which resembles murtabak the closest and includes egg, meat, and scallions. A thinner variant of martabak manis is martabak tipis kering.

== History ==
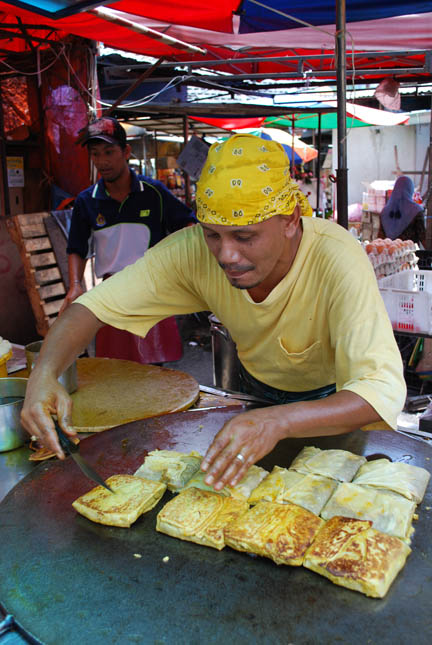
A streetside cook in Malaysia making murtabak on top of large flat fry pan, called a tava

13th-Century Abbasid author Muhammad bin Hasan al-Baghdadi wrote two recipes for muṭbaq مطبق in his book titled Kitab al-Tabikh, they described a dish made with 2 layers of bread and enveloping a sweet filling.

The word mutabbaq in Arabic means "folded". This suggests that murtabak might originate from Yemen, which had a sizeable Indian population; Through Indian traders it spread back to their home countries. Murtabak was then brought to Southeast Asia by Tamil Muslim traders.

17th century Ottoman traveller Evliya Çelebi described spiced mutabbak being made in Anatolia and Egypt, which was a pastry of thin dough cooked in a tandoor, food historian Priscilla Mary Işın likened this dish to gözleme.

Another version of muttabaq was created by a former Ottoman Empire soldier named Mohammed Zalatimo in the Old City of Jerusalem in 1860. His version was paper-thin folded filo dough filled with local white cheese; its name was derived from the act of layering yufka sheets. The exact origin of the craft of creating multilayer-dough sweets is debated, with some tracing it to Central Asia.

In countries where martabak is widely available, it is so common it has become an everyday dish. This dish is made not only at home, but often found in inexpensive food service menus specialising in traditional cuisine, which is why it has the reputation of street food. Sometimes martabak – especially sweet – goes on sale in stores already in finished form.

== Variants ==
=== Savoury ===
==== South East Asia ====
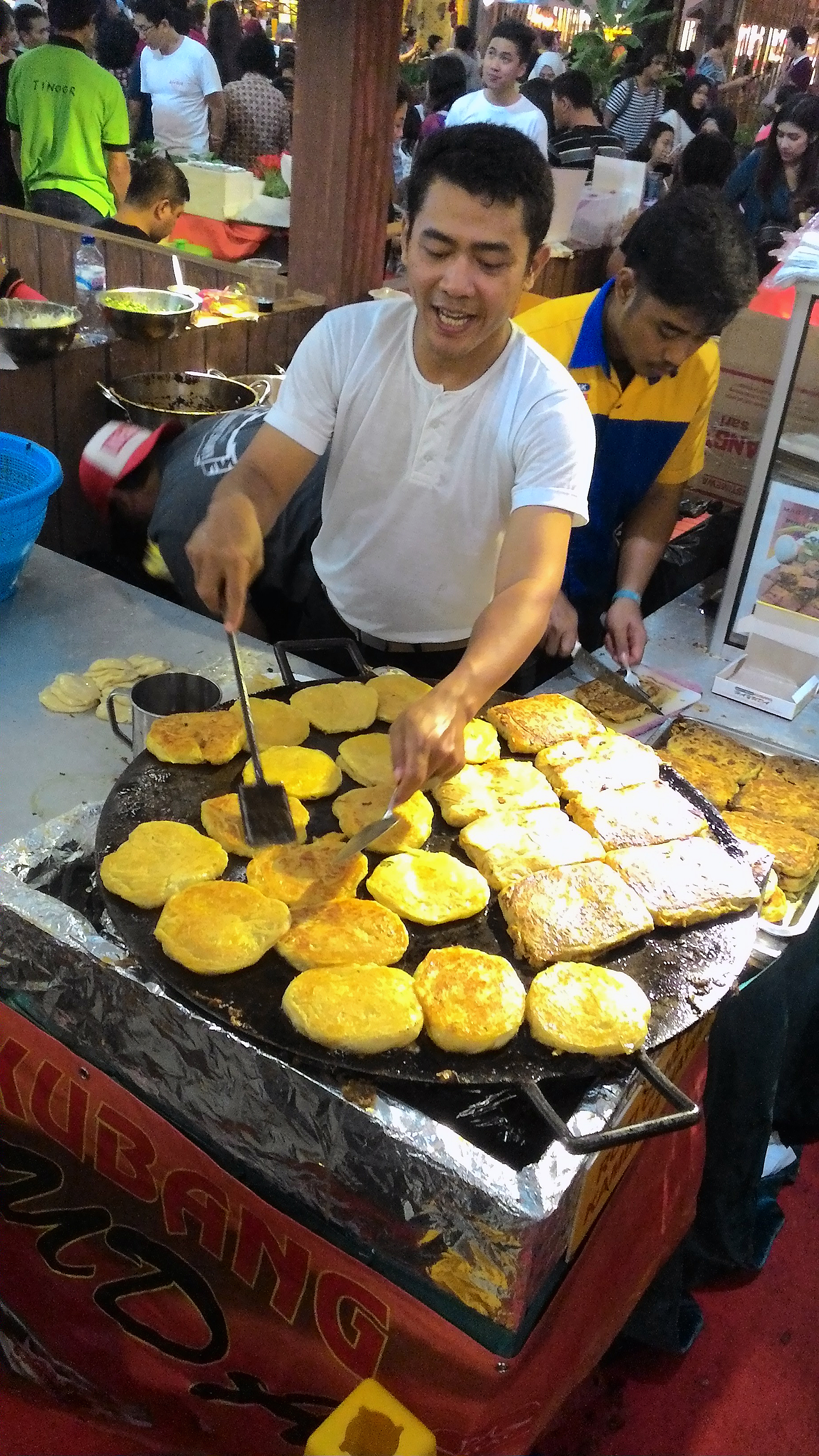
Martabak Kubang and roti cane making in Indonesia

There are many varieties of martabak. For example, in Brunei, most martabaks are usually not stuffed, but only made of dough (called martabak kosong) similar to the Indian paratha. Martabak kosong consists of a bread-like dough that is kneaded and prepared similarly to a pancake or other martabak by tossing it into the air, and served piping hot with a sweet curry sauce. In Singapore and Malaysia (where it is called murtabak), the murtabaks are usually filled with spiced beef, chicken or mutton and served with a curry sauce, sweet pickled onions or cucumber in ketchup. Another variant in Malaysia and Singapore is murtabak cheese which uses mozzarella cheese as additional filling. Johorean (Malaysia) and Singaporean murtabak uses more minced meat than most Malaysian murtabak.

The common ingredients of Indonesian egg martabak, besides the dough, is seasoned ground meat (beef, chicken or mutton), sliced green onions, some herbs (optional), beaten duck eggs, salt, and potatoes. Some street vendors mix the ground beef with curry seasoning. In Indonesia, the common spices to make the seasoned ground meat are shallots, garlic, ginger, cumin, coriander, turmeric, some salt, and sometimes a little bit of monosodium glutamate. All the spices are ground or minced and stir-fried altogether. Some martabak makers add extra ingredients and other varieties to make their martabak unique, but they all share the same main dough. To fry martabak, the chef uses a very large flat frying pan or iron griddle. Usually they use vegetable oil to fry, but it is not uncommon to use ghee or butter too.

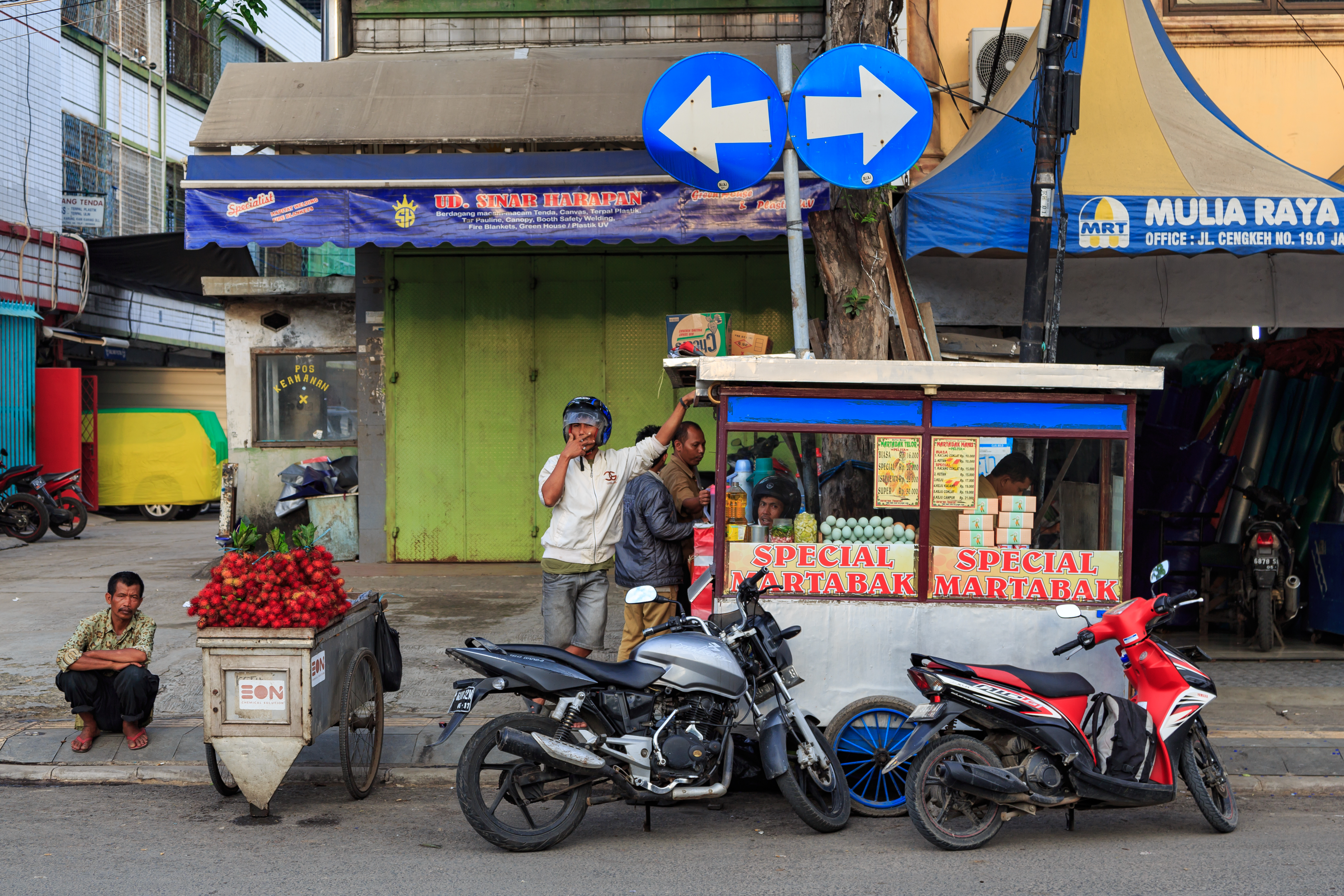
Martabak street vendor cart in Jakarta

Before serving, martabak usually is cut into portions. Sometimes it is eaten with sweet and salty soy sauce and pepper. Savoury versions of martabak in Indonesia and Malaysia usually are served with acar or pickled condiment consisting of diced cucumber, sliced carrot, shallots, and sliced chillies in sweetened vinegar whereas in Singapore, the condiment consists of sliced cucumbers in tomato ketchup. In Malaysia, Singapore and some areas in Sumatra, martabak is served with kari (curry) gravy. In Palembang, another variety of martabak is egg-martabak (eggs dropped into the flatten dough before folded while frying) served in curry (usually diced potatoes in beef curry) and topped with chillies in sweet-sour soy sauce called Martabak Haji Abdul Rozak, or more commonly known as Martabak HAR, made popular by an Indian Indonesian named Haji Abdul Rozak. There is also a popular martabak variant from Padang, West Sumatra called Martabak Kubang, which is served with light curry as dipping sauce.

Another variety of martabak, especially in Malaysia and Sumatra (such as in Jambi, Palembang, and Lampung), is one called martabak kentang (potato-stuffed martabak). It usually uses the similar dough as other martabak, but it is stuffed with a mix of diced potatoes, beaten eggs, chopped green onions, and spices instead of beaten egg and ground beef. It is eaten by dipping it into hot sweet-sour soy sauce or curry sauce.

There are many varieties of martabak, specifically in Indonesia, where various types of emerging toppings are being added to innovate the dish. Toppings that are used to substitute the meat are black-pepper-sauced minced meat, spicy tuna, shredded beef rendang, grilled salmon and instant noodles. The popular common instant noodle toppings being used are Indomie and Samyang spicy noodles. Mozzarella cheese is sprinkled outside the fried martabak and then torched to get a melty consistency.

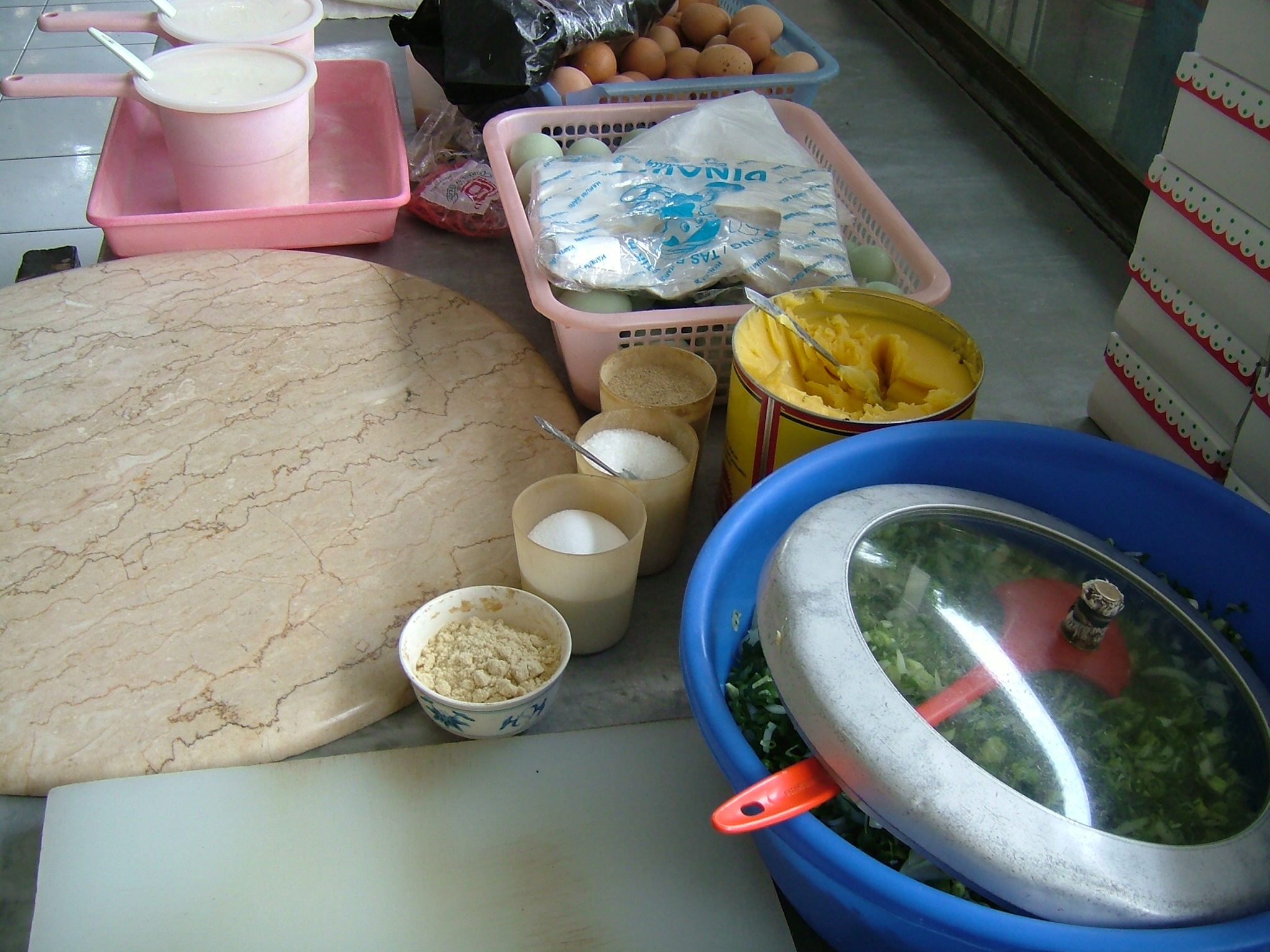
Ingredients of martabak

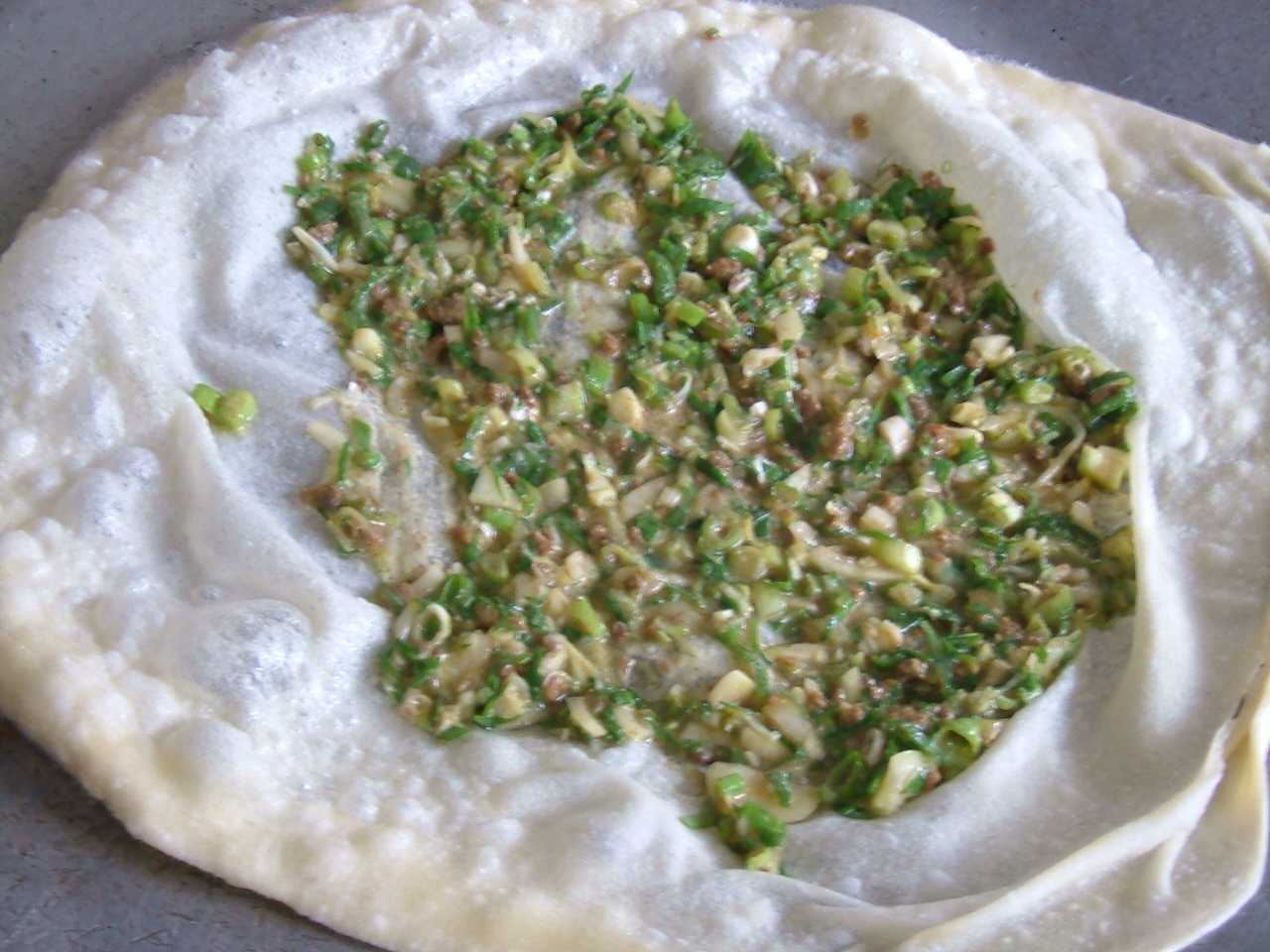
The making of egg martabak

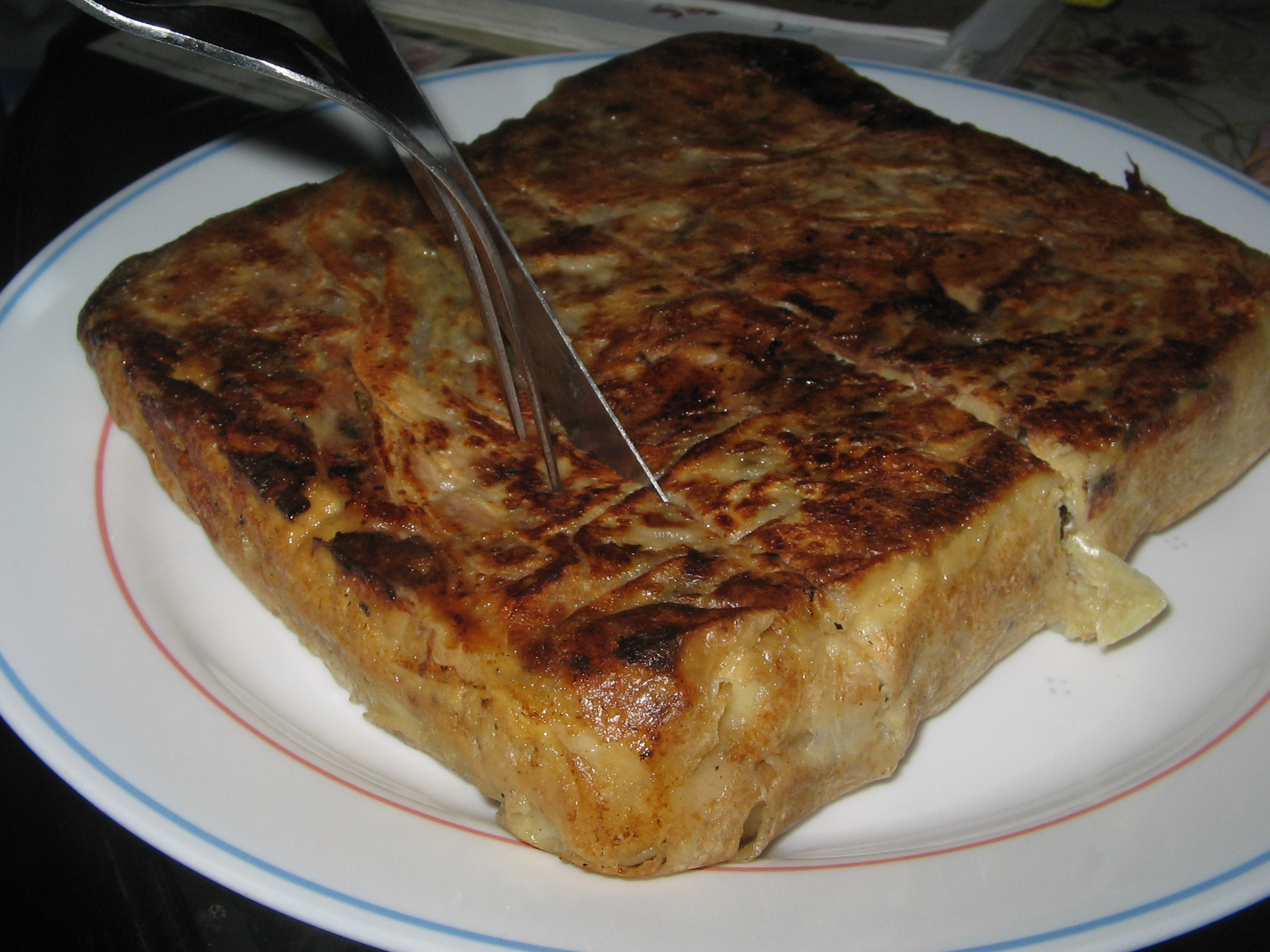
Murtabak Raja Kelantan

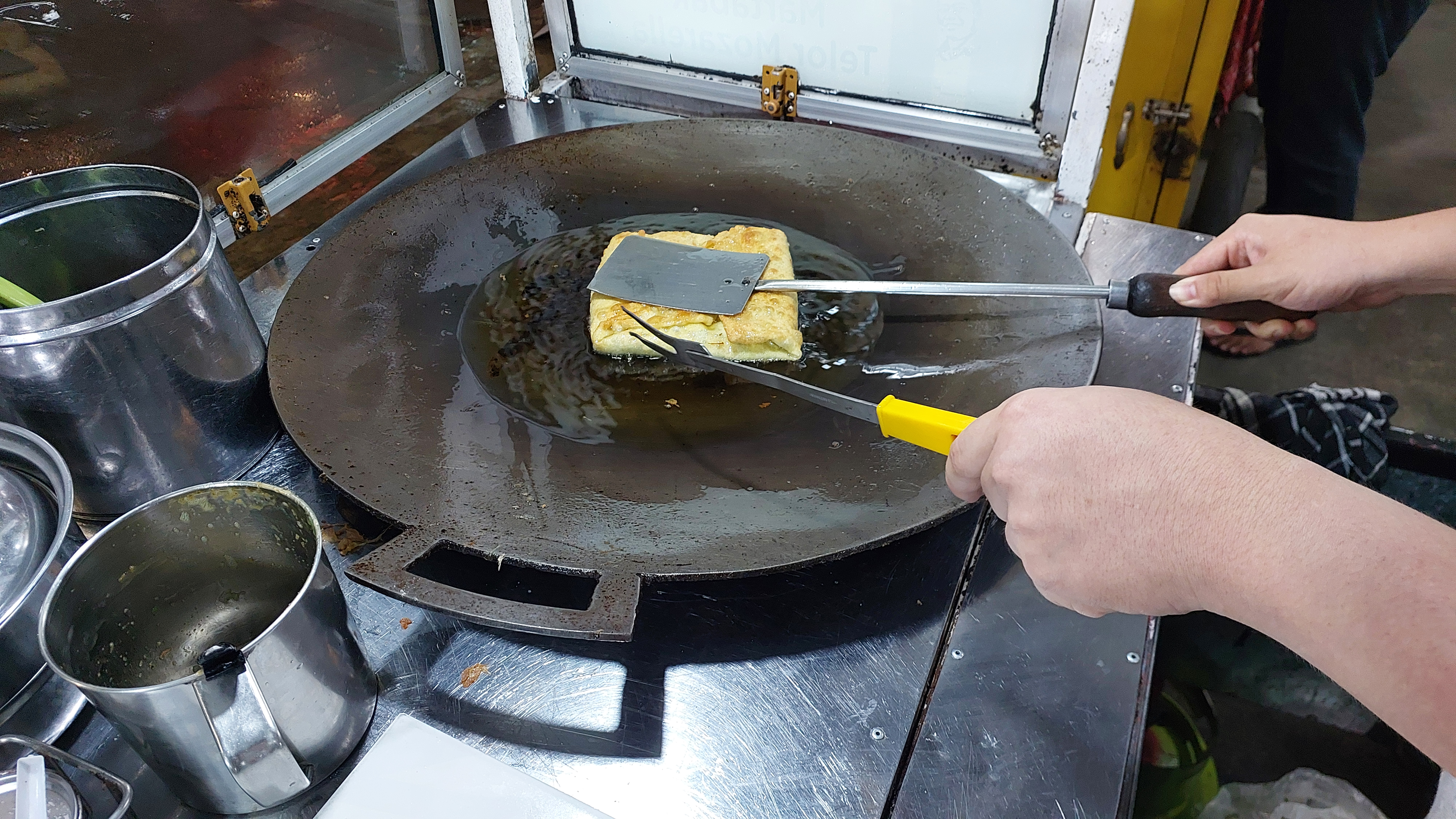
A martabak telur being prepared

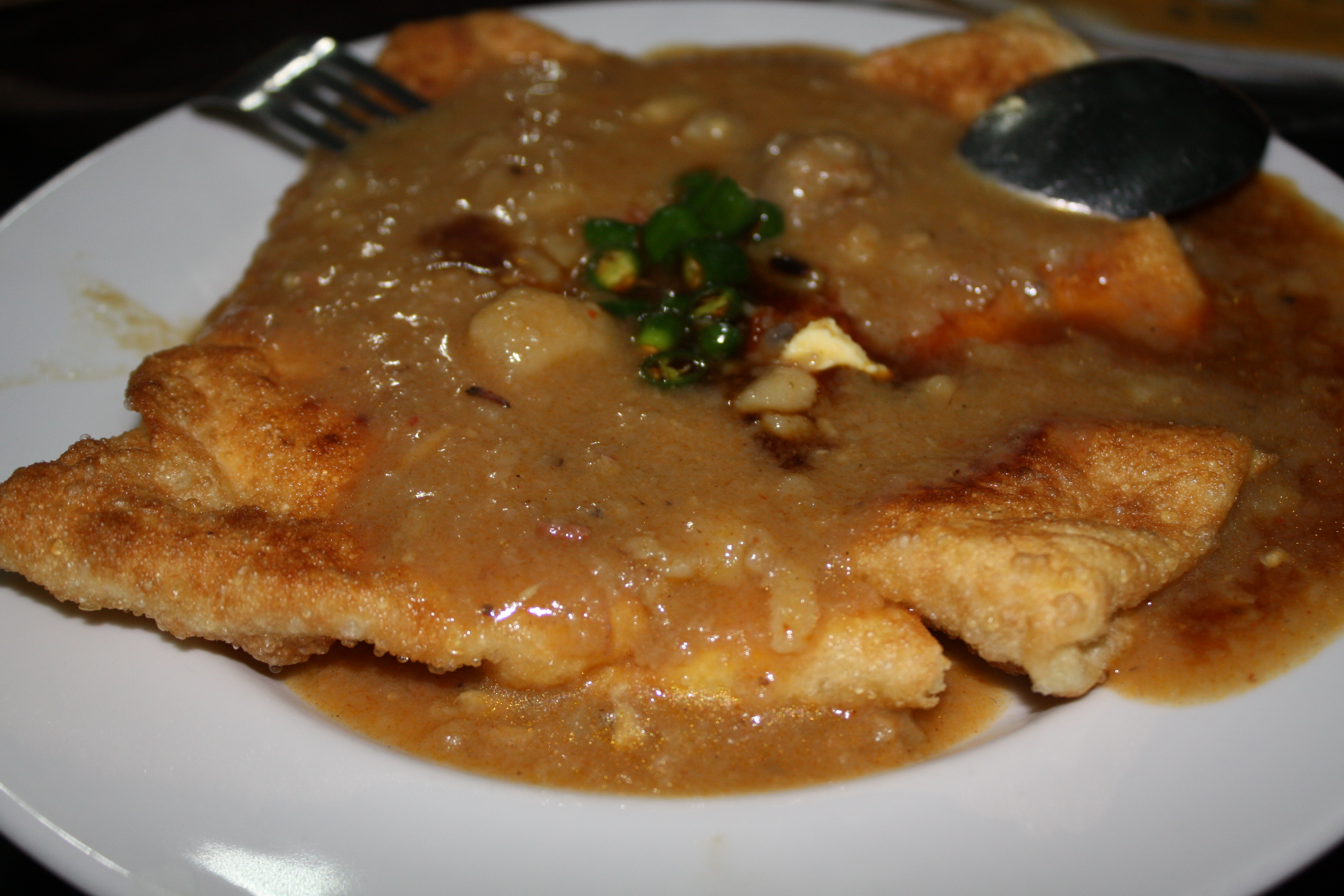
Martabak HAR from Palembang

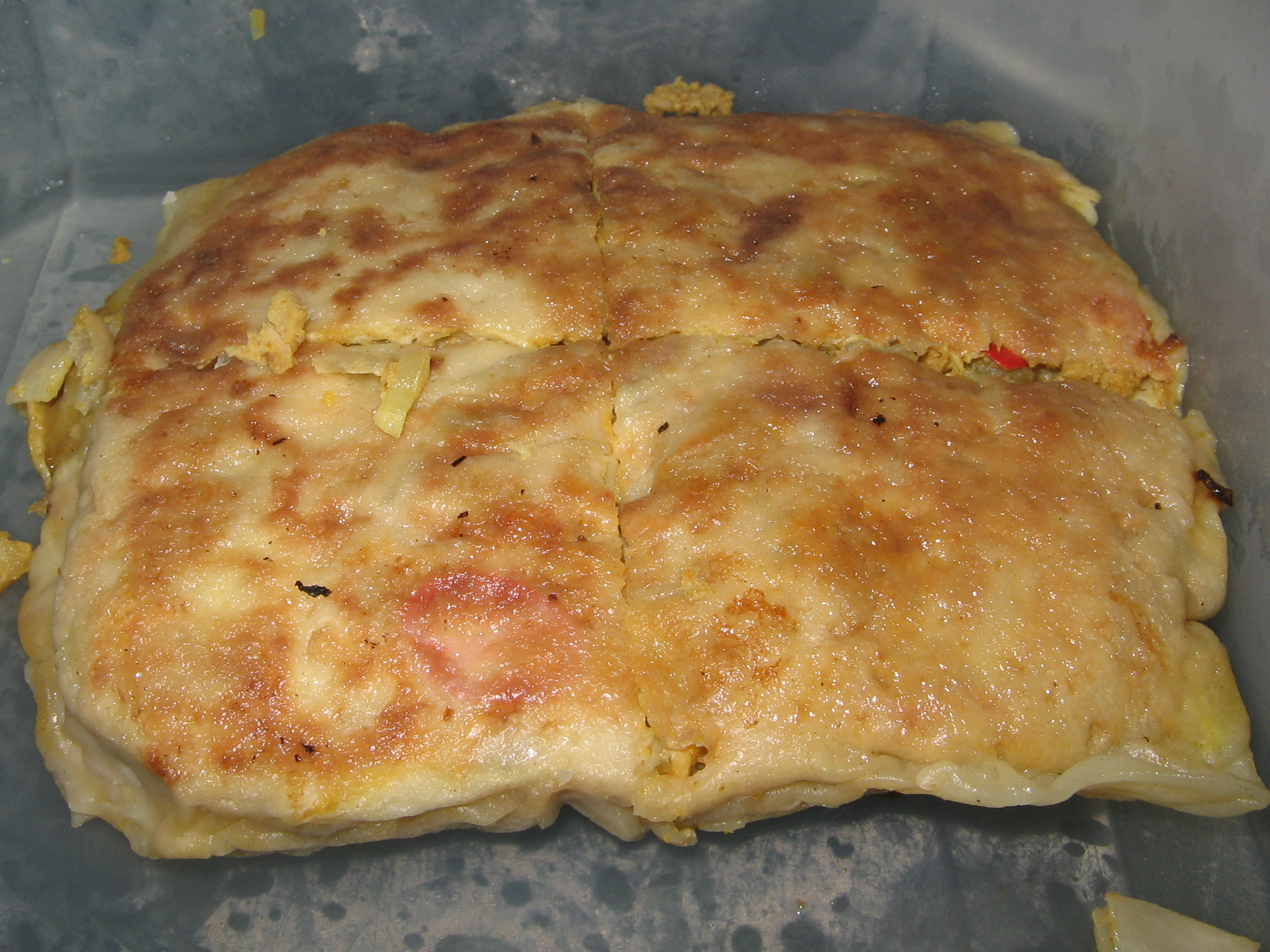
Murtabak in Malaysia

==== South Africa ====
The muttabah of Cape Malays in South Africa is mainly filled with minced meat and spinach with a cheese topping.

==== Levant ====
Muttabaq zaatar (Arabic: مطبق زعتر) is a traditional Palestinian muttabaq made by folding dough over fresh za'atar (Origanum syriacum) leaves, onions and sumac, which is then baked and topped with olive oil.

=== Sweet ===
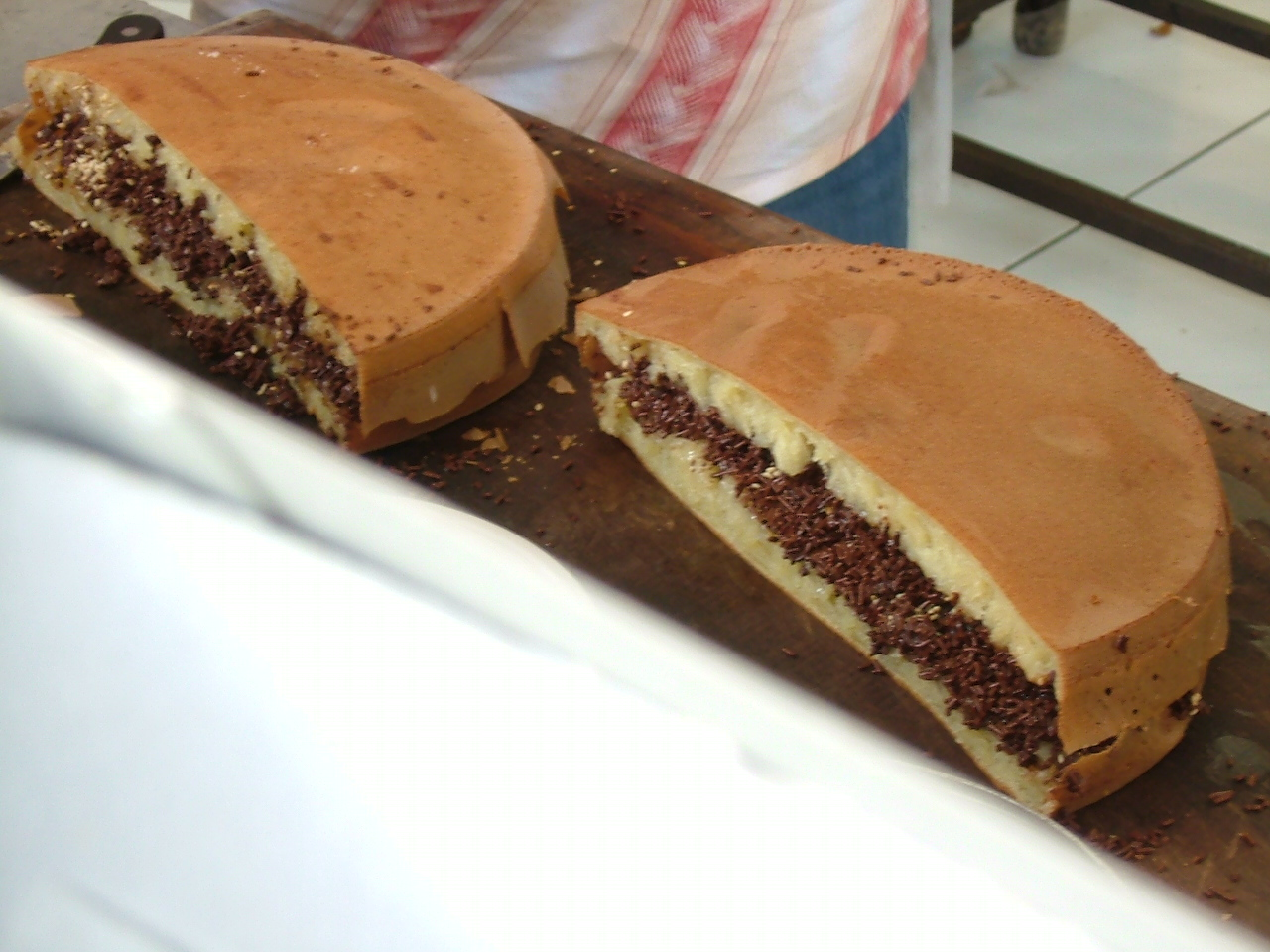
Martabak manis or terang bulan

Another variety of martabak is called martabak manis (sweet martabak), also known by the name Terang Bulan or Martabak Bangka. This naming however, is only valid in Indonesia, since the identical folded thick pancake is called apam balik instead in Malaysia.

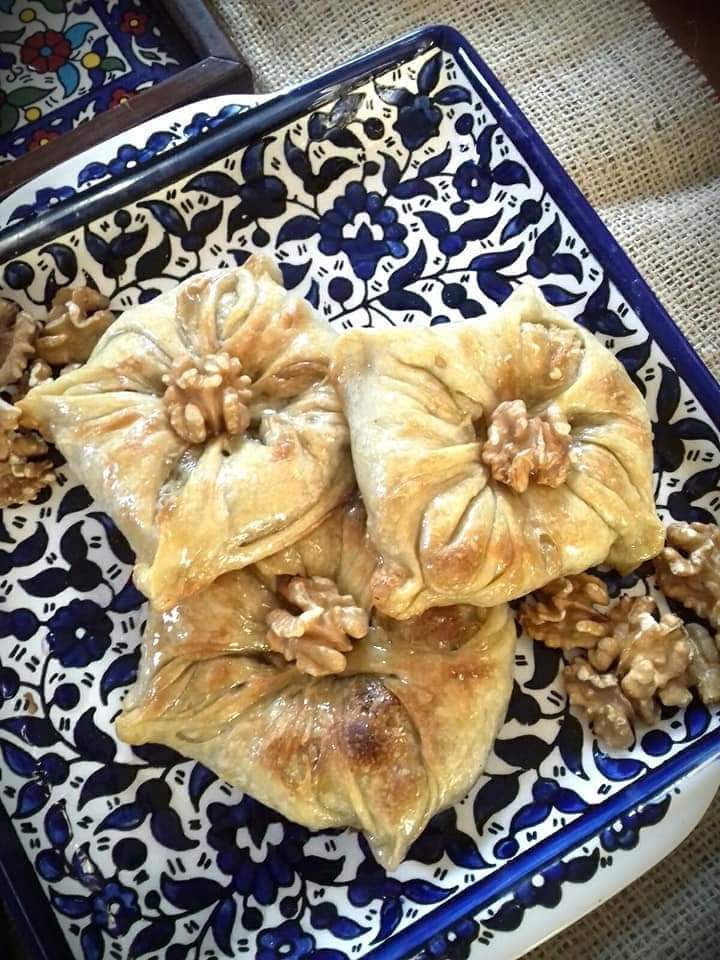
Levantine Muttabaq, with walnut filling

Despite sharing the same name (because they are both folded), the cooking method, dough (which uses yeast and baking soda), and the ingredients (usually vanilla extract is added as essence) are different from egg martabak, giving it a consistency more like a crumpet. While it is baked on a pan, the sweet martabak is spread with butter or margarine, sugar, crushed peanuts, chocolate sprinkles, cheese or other toppings. Before serving, the martabak is folded in half, so the toppings get in the middle of martabak. In parts of Indonesia, egg martabak may also be called Martabak Malabar to distinguish it from sweet martabak.

When ordering Martabak Manis, some stall offer two choice of margarine: Blue Band margarine or Wijsman butter. The Wijsman butter is more costly compared to Blueband margarine as the Wijsman is made by 100% cow milk fat.

==== Levant ====
Palestinian mutabbaq is made with thin, stretched out dough that is folded over the filling and then baked in an oven, the filling is either nuts or unsalted goat cheese. It is topped with a sugar syrup. Traditionally, sweetened jibneh baladi is used.

== See also ==
- Saudi Arabian cuisine
- Yemeni cuisine
- Malaysian cuisine
- Singaporean cuisine
- Indonesian cuisine
- Indian cuisine
- List of egg dishes
- List of pancakes
- List of stuffed dishes
- Okonomiyaki
- Roti canai
