= Martabak manis =

Asian pancake

Apam balik أڤم باليق
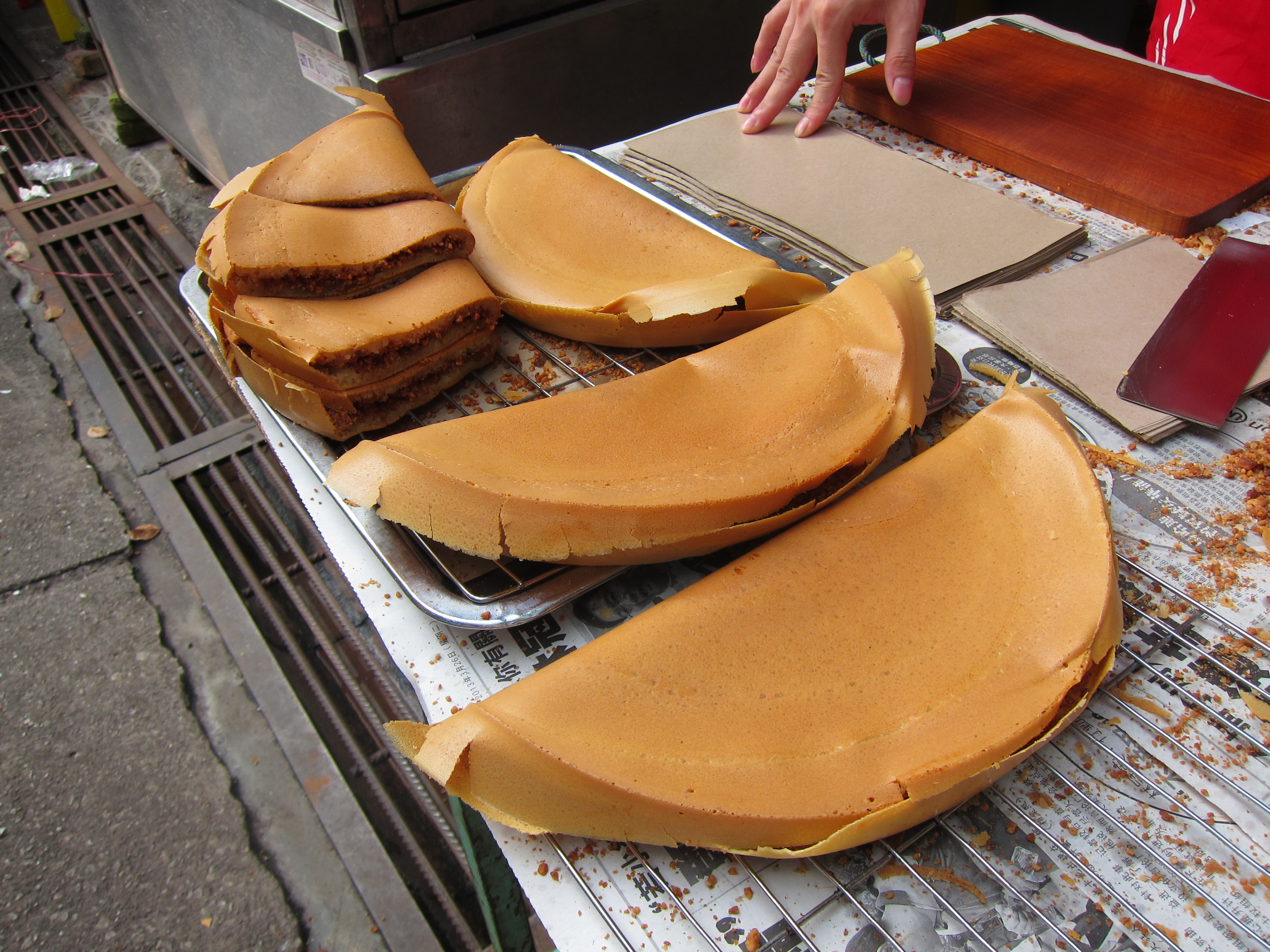
- A giant apam balik variation
- Alternative names: Ban Jian Kuih (Tâi-lô: bān-tsian-kué), Chin Loong Pau, Min Chiang Kueh, Martabak Manis, Peanut Pancake, Terang Bulan, Martabak Bangka, Hok Lo Pan, Kue Bandung, Apam Pulau Pinang, Kuih Haji, Kueh Singapura, Kuih Malaya, Khanom Thang Taek, Khanom Pot Khwai, Khanom Hua Lat, Khanom Bale
- Type: Pancakes
- Place of origin: Fujian, China
- Region or state: East and Southeast Asia
- Associated cuisine: China, Brunei, Indonesia, Malaysia, Singapore, Thailand
- Main ingredients: Flour, hot water, baking powder, bicarbonate soda, sugar, eggs, peanut, margarine, butter

Martabak manis (lit. 'sweet murtabak') also known as Apam balik (lit. 'turnover pancake'; Jawi: أڤم باليق), terang bulan (lit. 'moonlight'), peanut pancake, or ban jian kueh (Chinese: 曼煎粿; Tâi-lô: bān-tsian-kué), is a sweet dessert originating in Fujian cuisine which now consists of many varieties at specialist roadside stalls or restaurants throughout Brunei, Indonesia, Malaysia and Singapore. It can also be found in Hong Kong as (Chinese: 冷糕), Taiwan as (Chinese: 麥仔煎), Southern Thailand as khanom thang taek (ขนมถังแตก) and in the Sulu Archipelago, Philippines as tarambulan.

== Origins ==
The invention has been attributed, though without evidence, to Zuo Zongtang, a military leader of the late Qing dynasty. In 1855, the army of the Taiping Heavenly Kingdom invaded the Fujian region and General Zuo was appointed to lead an army to crush the rebels. To provide the soldiers with food without interfering in the life of local people, General Zuo is said to have decided to switch from the flatbread which was eaten together with spring onion and chilli sauce, to a pancake that used locally sourced and mass-produced ground cane sugar and peanut as filling.

The recipe does seem to have spread throughout the Fujian region, especially around Quanzhou and later on throughout Southeast China. It was brought south into Southeast Asia or Nanyang by Hokkien and Teochew immigrants, especially to Singapore, and merchants spread it to neighbouring regions.

In Indonesia, this dish originated in Bangka Belitung Islands by ethnic Chinese (Hokkien and Khek) and it was named “Hok Lo Pan” which translates to “Hoklo ethnicity’s cake.” Its traditional topping includes sugar and sesame seeds. Martabak manis have different names in different regions. In West Borneo, it is called apam pinang, similar to Malaysia's apam balik. In Central Java, martabak manis is referred to as kue Bandung which means Bandung cake. The origin of kue Bandung started when a man from Bangka Belitung, opened a Martabak manis stall beside a “Bandung Noodle” stall.

== Other names ==
The dessert is also known by various names in different languages, depending on the region.

=== Indonesia ===
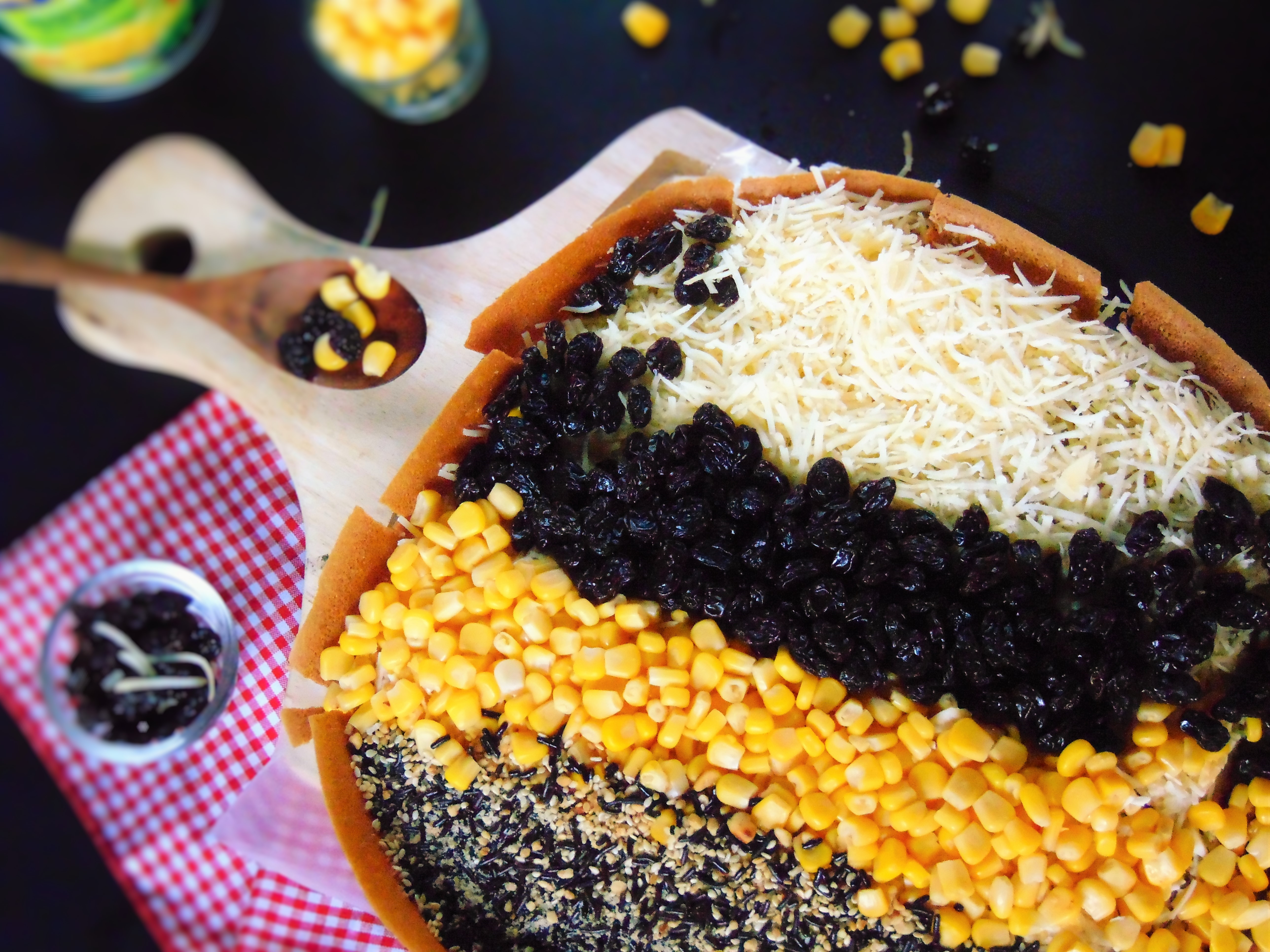
More recent Indonesian terang bulan with various toppings.

- Terang Bulan, (lit. 'moonlight') refer to the big round pancake, prior to folding, resembling the shape of a full moon, (East Java, Lesser Sunda Islands, Southern Kalimantan, North Kalimantan, East Kalimantan, Sulawesi, Maluku and Western New Guinea)
- Martabak Manis, lit. 'sweet martabak' (Southern Sumatra, Banten, Jakarta, West Java, most of Central Java (except Semarang) and Yogyakarta)
- Kue Bandung (in Semarang, Central Java)
- Martabak Bangka (North Sumatra and Riau Archipelago)
- Martabak Bandung (West Sumatra)
- Apam Pinang (in West Kalimantan)
- Apam Keubeu (in Aceh)
- Hok Lo Pan (福佬粄) (in Bangka Belitung Islands and Batam);

=== Malaysia and Singapore ===
- Ban Jian Kueh (Tâi-lô: bān-tsian-kué) (Hokkien, in general for both countries)
- Dai Gau Min (大塊麵) (Cantonese, in Perak)
- Chin Loong Pau (煎弄包) (Cantonese, in Kuala Lumpur/Selangor)
- Kap Piang 合餅 (Hakka, in Sabah)
- Mak Pan 麥粄 (Hakka, in general for both countries)
- Apam Pulau Pinang (Malay, in Penang)
- Kuih Haji (Malay, in certain areas)
- Apam Balik (Malay, in certain areas)
- Apong (Malay, in Kelantan)
- Apang Balek (Malay, in Terengganu and in certain areas of Pahang)
- Apom Balek (Malay, in Kedah)
- Terang Bulan (Malay, in Sabah)

=== Brunei ===
- Kuih Malaya/Singapura (Malay, in Brunei), named during the colonial era when masses of Chinese emigrants went to the region in places such as Singapore

=== China ===
- 滿煎糕

=== Hong Kong ===
- 冷糕 (Cantonese)
- 砂糖夾餅 (Cantonese)

=== Singapore ===
- Ban Jian Kueh (Hokkien, Singapore)
- Min Chiang Kueh/Min Jiang Kueh (Teochew, in Singapore)
- Peanut Pancake (麵煎粿) (Singapore)
- Apam Balik (Malay, Singapore)

=== Taiwan ===
- 麥仔煎 (Taiwanese Hokkien)

=== Philippines ===
- Tarambulan/Tarang Bulan/Terang Bulan/Apam/Apam Saba/Apam Sabah (in Tawi-Tawi, Sulu, Basilan and Zamboanga)
- Muslim hotcake (Chavacano)

== Description ==
The pancake's batter is made from a mixture of flour, eggs, sugar, baking soda, coconut milk and water. The batter is cooked upon a thick round iron frying pan in plenty of palm margarine to avoid it sticking to the pan. Then other ingredients are sprinkled as filling; the most common or traditional is crushed peanut granules with sugar and sweetcorn kernels (available from cans), but modern innovations such as chocolate sprinkles and cheddar cheese are also available. Then, the pancake is folded (hence the name: "turnover pancake") and cut into several pieces.

In Indonesia there is a smaller version made with smaller pan, they are called martabak mini or terang bulan mini.

The texture of the apam balik can vary depending on the amount of batter and type of pan used, from one that is akin to a crispier form of crumpets to small thin light pancake shells that break when bitten (the latter is usually called apam balik nipis, 'thin apam balik').

There is a Peranakan variant, the apom balik, that closely resembles the Indonesian Serabi.

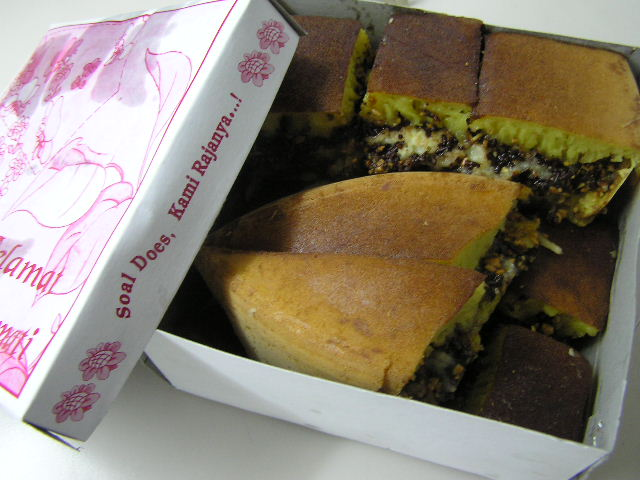
Martabak Bangka or Terang Bulan

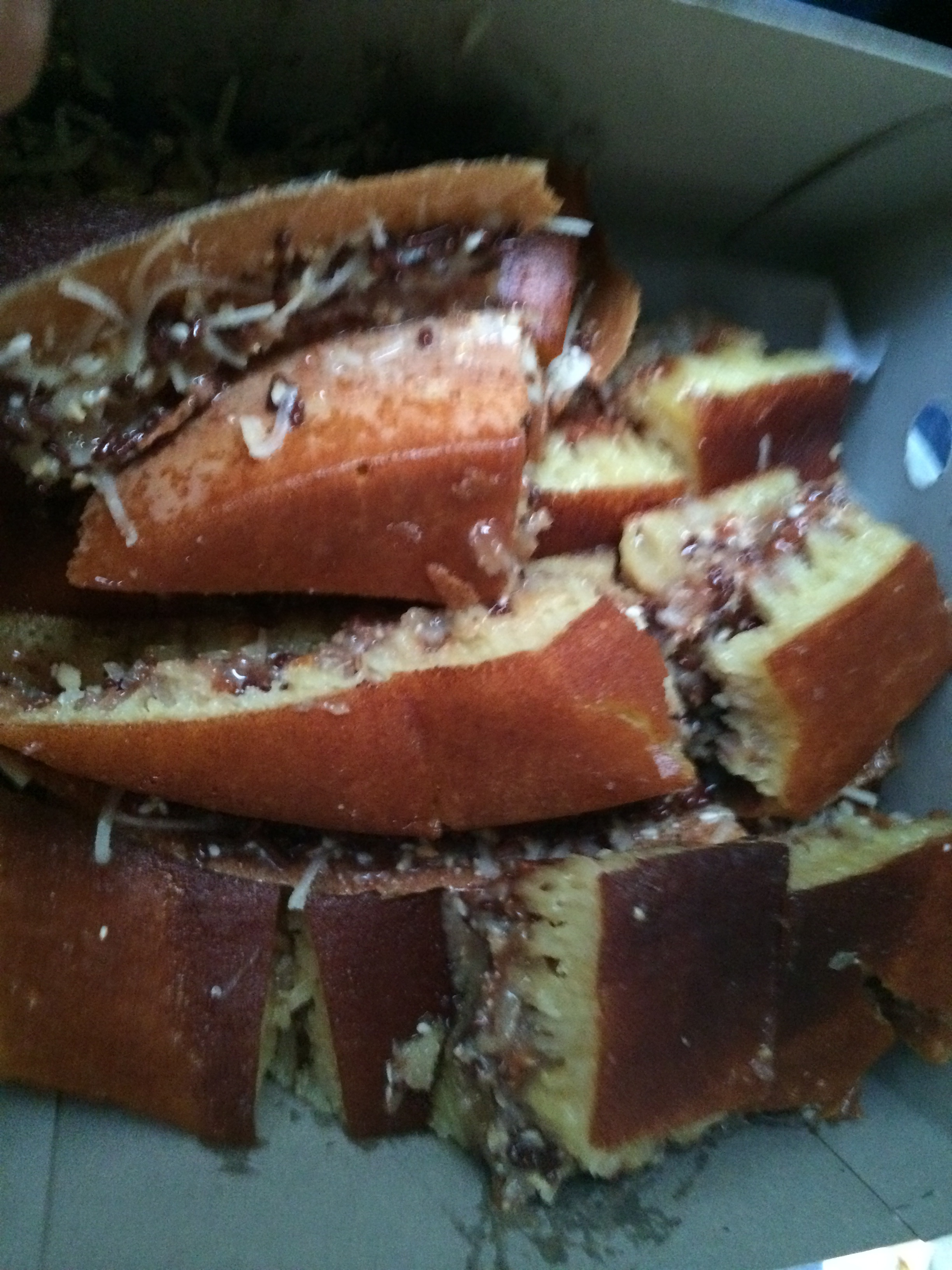
Sweet Martabak filled with chocolate

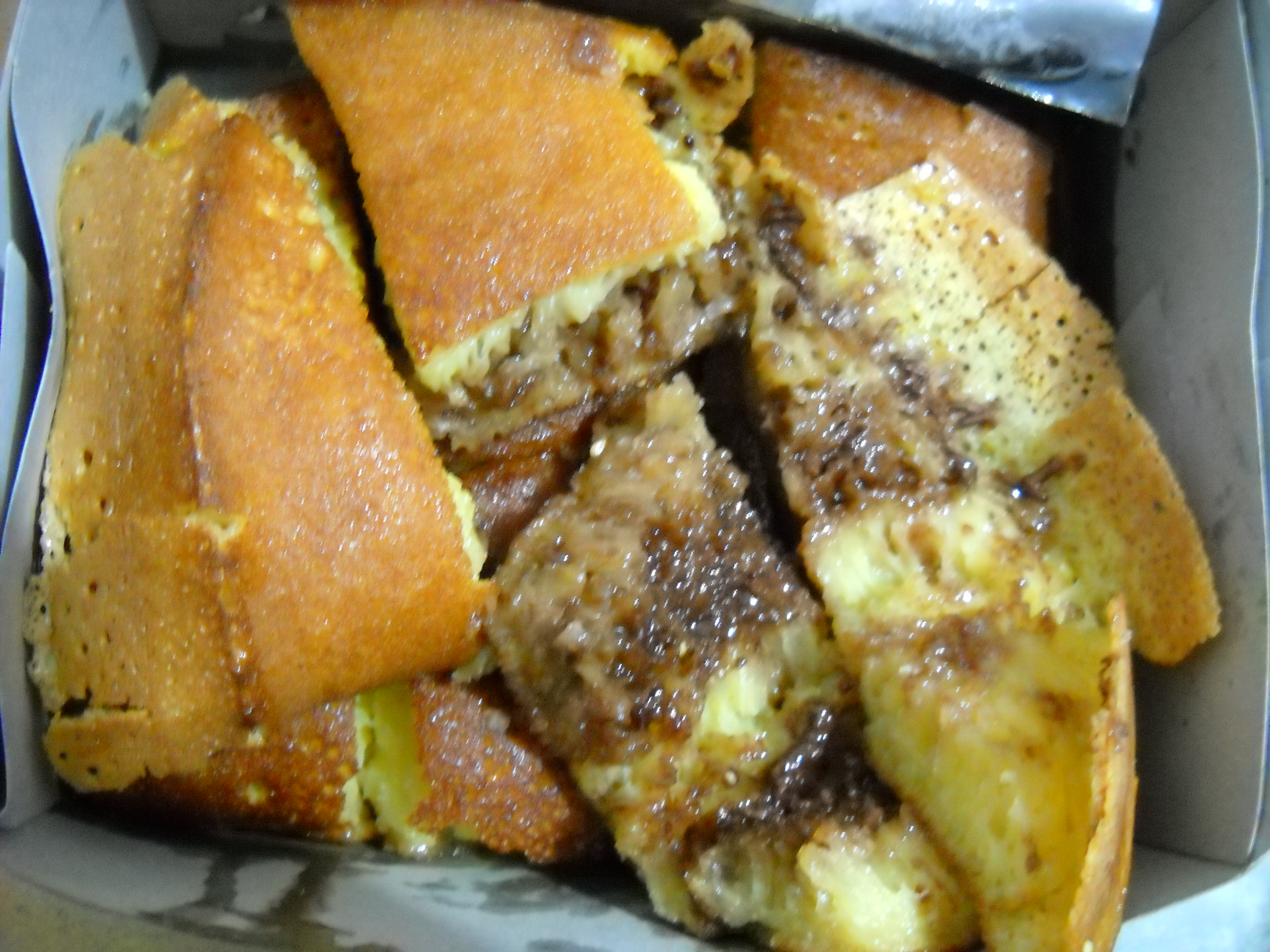
Hoklopan

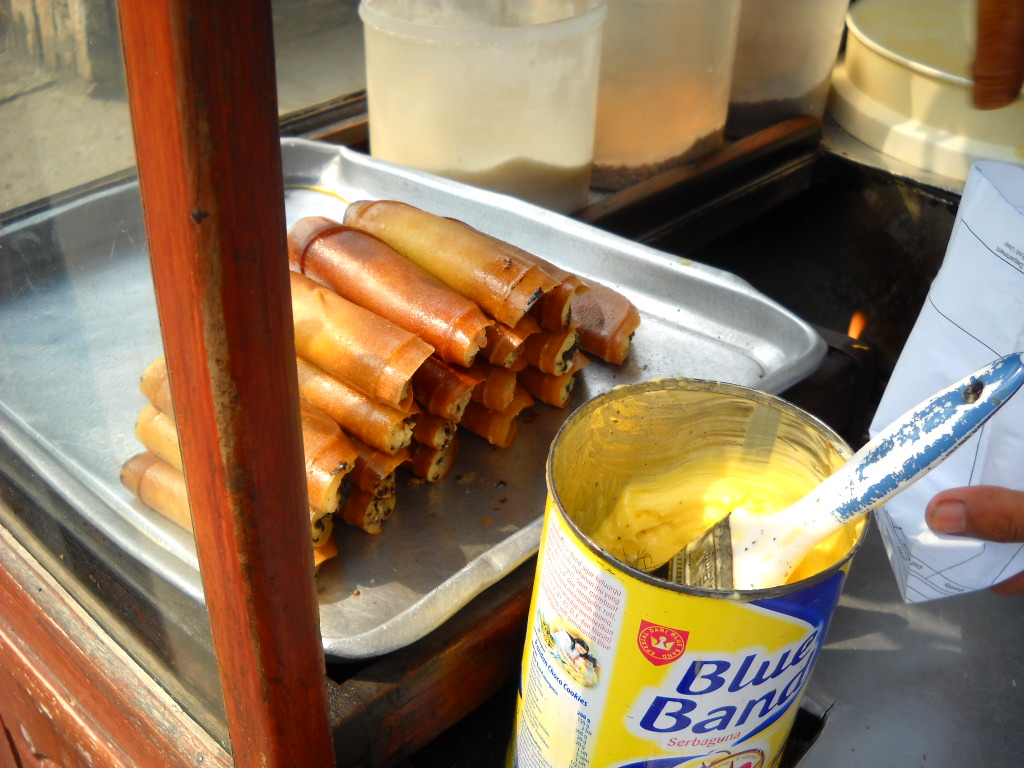
Martabak mini

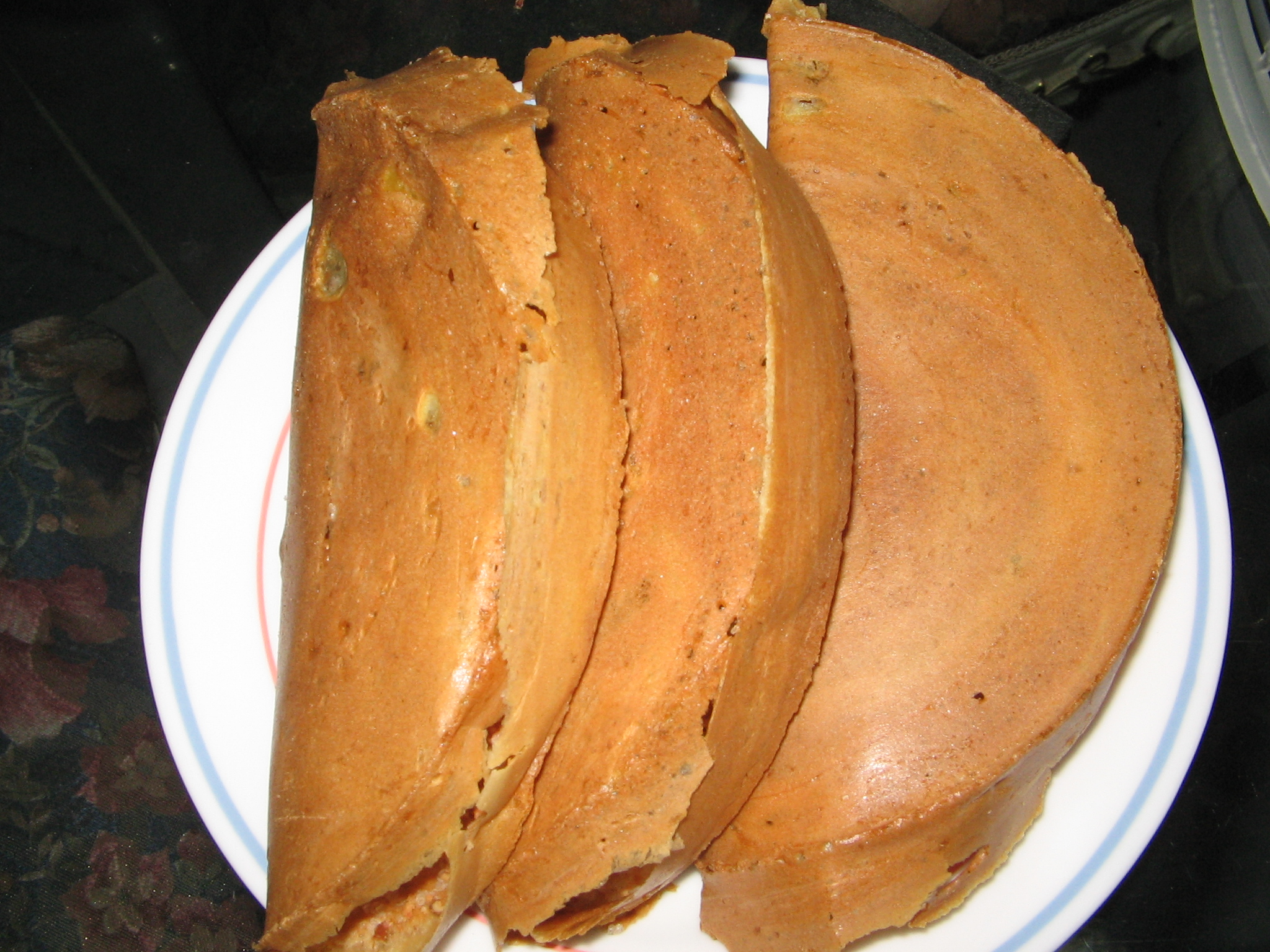
Apam balik

== See also ==
- List of pancakes
- List of stuffed dishes
- Peranakan cuisine
- Dosai
- Crumpet
- Dorayaki
