= Seeni sambol =

Sri Lankan condiment

- Alternative names: Seeni sambal, Sini sambol, Sawi sambol
- Course: Condiments
- Place of origin: Sri Lanka
- Serving temperature: Room temperature
- Main ingredients: red onion/shallots, tamarind juice, chillies, salt, sugar
- Variations: Maldives fish, curry leaves, cloves, cinnamon, cardamom, lemongrass
- Food energy (per serving): 232 kcal (970 kJ)

Seeni sambol (Sinhala: සීනි සම්බෝල, Tamil: சீனி சம்பல்), also known as Sini sambol or Sawi sambol, is a traditional Sri Lankan condiment. It is a caramelised onion chutney or relish, with flavours which are spicy, sweet and aromatic. It is served as an accompaniment to rice, curries, idiyappam (string hoppers) and appam (plain hoppers). It is an integral component of lamprais and seeni banis (a brioche bun with seeni sambol filling).

In Sinhala and Tamil, seeni means sweet or sugar and sambol means sauce. The main ingredients are onion, sugar, tamarind juice, red chillies and salt, which can also be combined with Maldives fish, curry leaves, lemongrass, cinnamon, cardamom and cloves.

== See also ==
- Cuisine of Sri Lanka
- Sambal
- Pol sambol
- Lunumiris
