= Kiribath =

Coconut milk rice dish

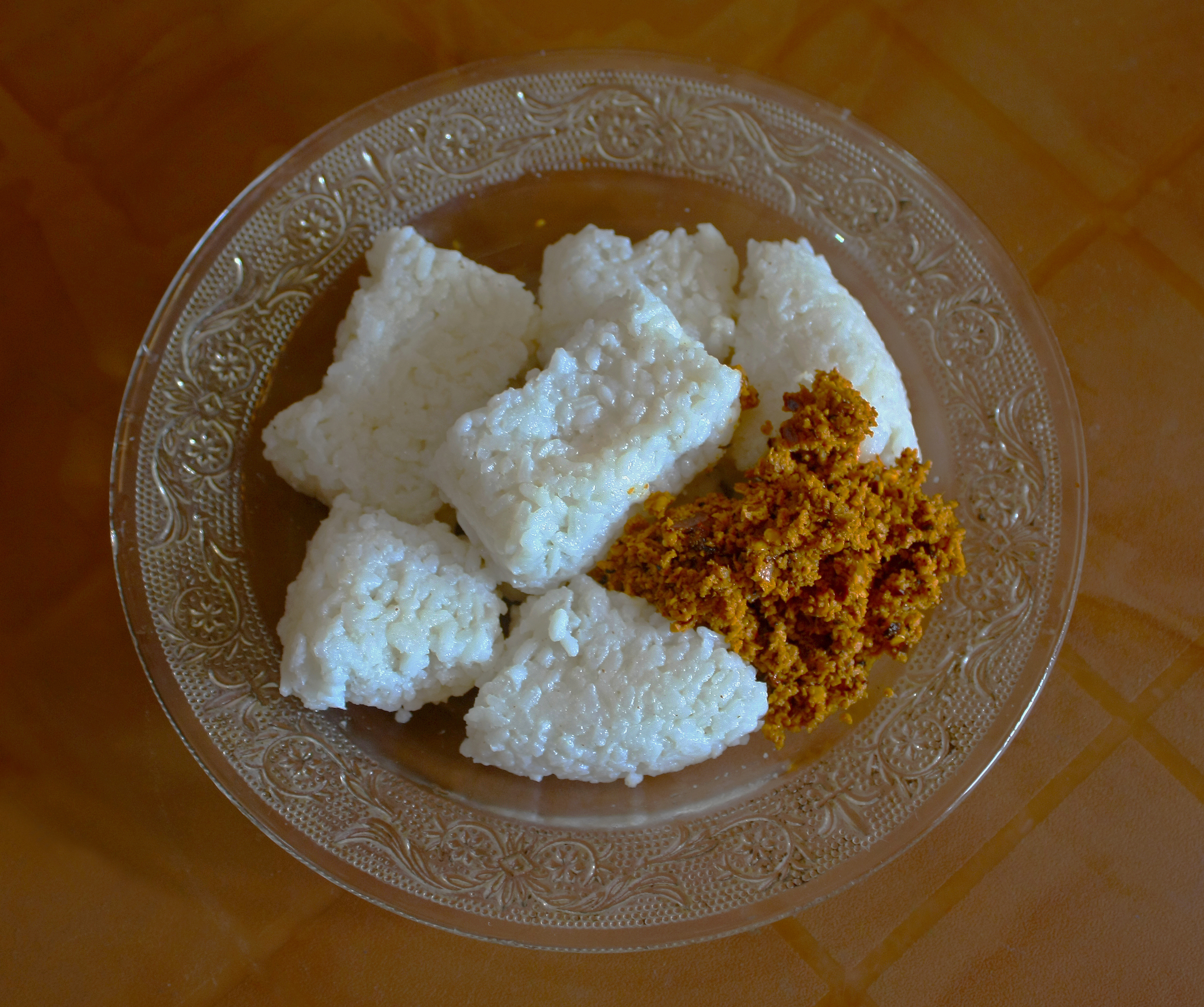
- Kiribath
- Alternative names: කිරිබත්, Milk rice
- Course: Breakfast, Main dish
- Place of origin: Sri Lanka
- Associated cuisine: Sri Lankan cuisine
- Cooking time: 50 minutes to 1 hour 20 min
- Main ingredients: Rice, coconut milk
- Ingredients generally used: Salt
- Variations: Mun Kiribath, Imbul kiribath
- Similar dishes: Coconut rice

Kiribath (Sinhala: කිරිබත්) is a traditional Sri Lankan dish made from rice. It is prepared by cooking rice with coconut milk, hence this name, and can be considered a form of rice cake or rice pudding. Kiribath is an essential dish in Sri Lankan cuisine. It is very commonly served for breakfast on the first day of each month and also has the added significance of being eaten for any auspicious moment throughout one's lifetime which are marking times of transition. It is one of the more renowned traditional dishes in Sri Lanka.

== Etymology ==
The word is a compound with a transparent meaning in the Sinhala language, where Kiri (කිරි) means "milk" and bath ( බත්) means "rice".

== History ==
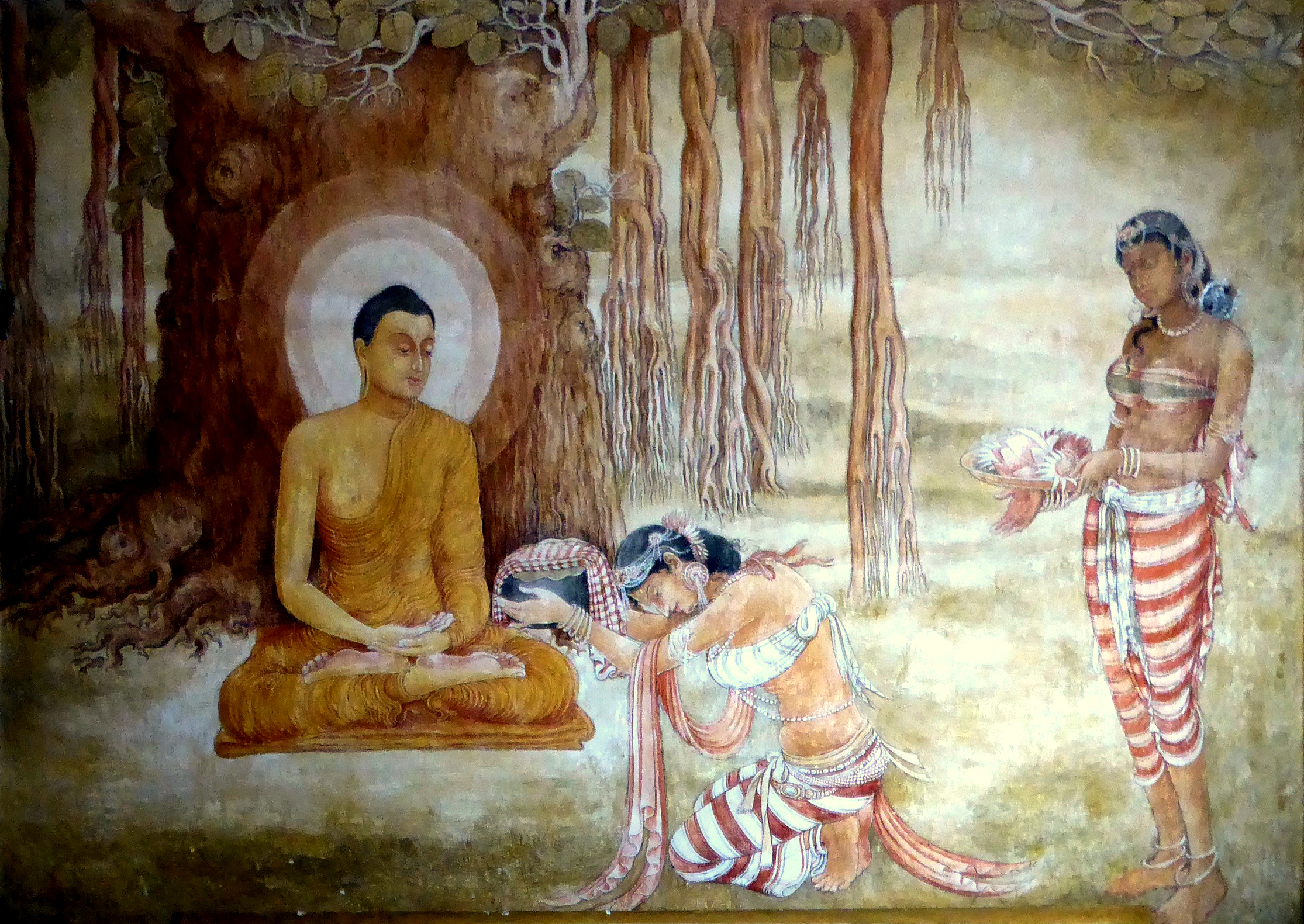
Sujata offered milk rice to Gautama Buddha depicted on fresco at Kelaniya Raja Maha Vihara.

The origins of kiribath are not clear, although the dish seems to be unique to Sri Lanka.

It is said that Sujata offered kiribath/kiripidu to Gautama Buddha whilst he was meditating under the bodhi tree, just before attaining enlightenment.

== Occasions ==
In a Sinhalese home, and during Sinhalese holidays and ceremonies kiribath plays a significant role. The dish celebrates festive or auspicious occasions and symbolises the beginning of new pursuits or transitions in life. Traditionally, it is also eaten by families on the first day of each month.

=== New Year ===
Kiribath has a very important role for the Sinhalese in celebrating the Sinhalese New Year where it will be consumed as the first meal of the year. At the dawn of the new year, a hearth within the household is lit by the lady of the house and the traditional pot of kiribath is boiled. Sometimes rice that has been kept especially for this occasion will be used, as this occasion requires the best rice, which is expressed in terms of taste. When the cooking is finished, after a series of observances and rituals the family begins to eat, but not before making an offering to the Buddha and the gods first. The family will eat from the same rice, as if they are symbolically dining together with the Buddha and the deities. During the Sinhalese New Year, or on any other special occasion, kiribath will be served as the main dish and centrepiece of the meal. At the table, kiribath is served alongside traditional sweets like Kevum, Kokis, bananas and many other delicacies. After this, the oil lamp is lit and the first meal of the year commences. The kiribath symbolises life and so it is fed to the rest of the family by the head of the family, either the father or the mother, to their progenitors for the New Year.

=== Feeding ceremony ===
Kiribath is traditionally the first solid food fed to an infant.

=== Weddings ===
Kiribath is fed by bridegrooms to brides at their wedding.

== Ingredients and preparation ==
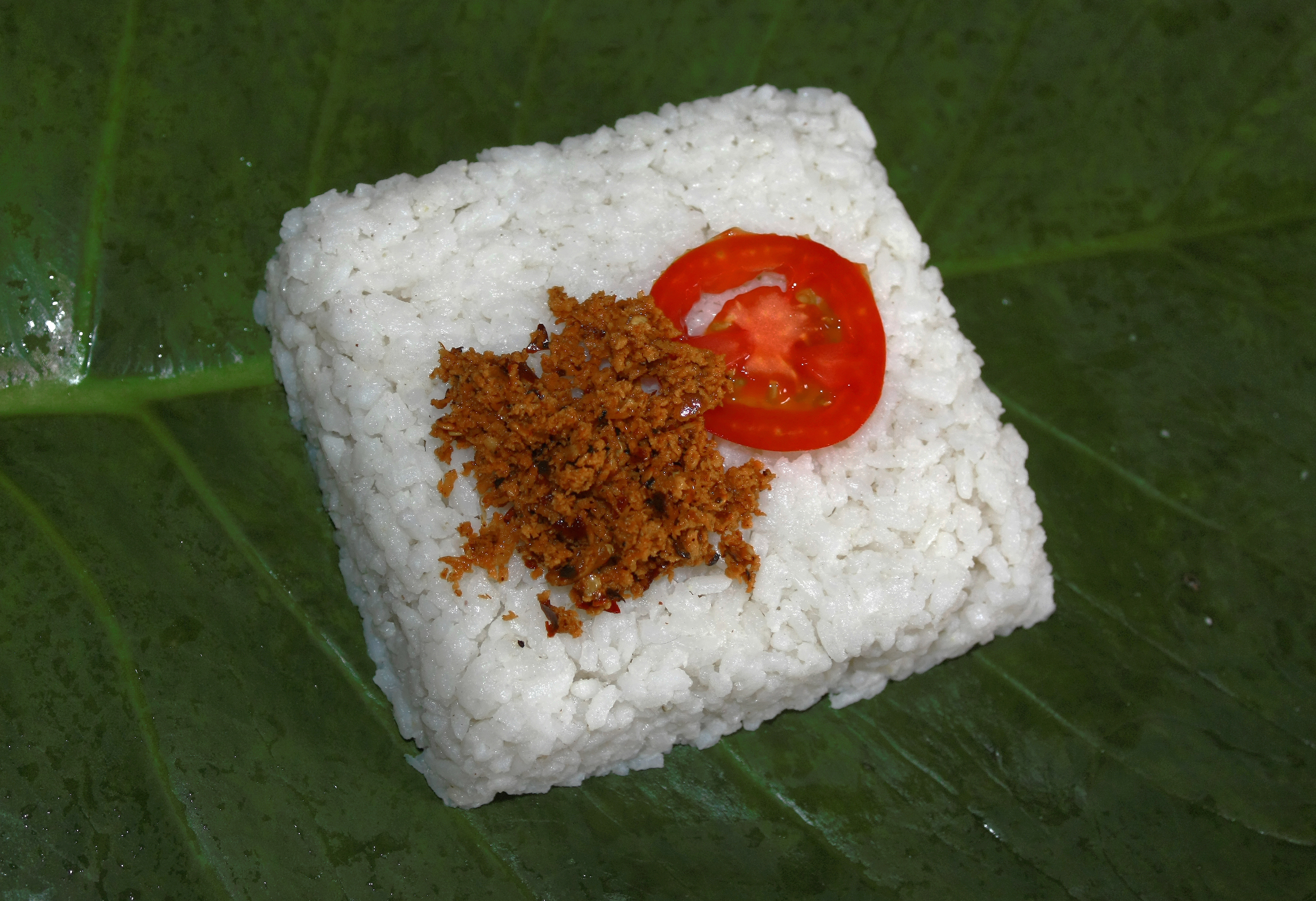
Kiribath served with lunumiris.

Ingredients

Kiribath is typically prepared from four basic components: white short-grain rice, thick coconut milk or basic milk, water and salt to taste.

It is made from starchy and sticky rice, traditionally a variety known as rathu haal or rathu kakulu haal for its neutral flavour and cooking qualities.

Preparation

The rice is cooked in coconut milk, sometimes with added ingredients such as sesame seeds or cashews. Kiribath is commonly compressed and cut into diamond or square shaped blocks before serving.

Consumption

Kiribath is usually served with lunumiris, a relish made of red onions, mixed with chili flakes, Maldives fish, salt, and lime. It can also be consumed with seeni sambol, jaggery, bananas, hoppers, bread and roti.

Although served onto the plate with a spoon, kiribath is traditionally eaten by hand to mix with the lunumiris.

== Variations ==
There are variations of kiribath including:

=== Mung kiribath ===
Mung kiribath (Sinhala: මුං කිරිබත්) is a variation of Kiribath made by adding boiled green gram to the milk rice. The same recipe and procedure can be followed to make this variation. It is often prepared in Buddhist temples.

=== Imbul kiribath ===
Imbul kiribath (Sinhala: ඉඹුල් කිරිබත්) is a sweet variation of the original. It is made by taking a small amount of milk rice, made in the regular process, and spreading it on a banana leaf. A sweet filling made of coconut and jaggery, called Pani pol, is placed in the center. The banana leaf is folded and rolled vertically and pressed firmly, giving it its unusual cylindrical shape.

== See also ==
- Osechi
- Rice and curry (Sri Lanka)
- No htamin
