= Hot butter cuttlefish =

Sri Lankan cuttlefish dish

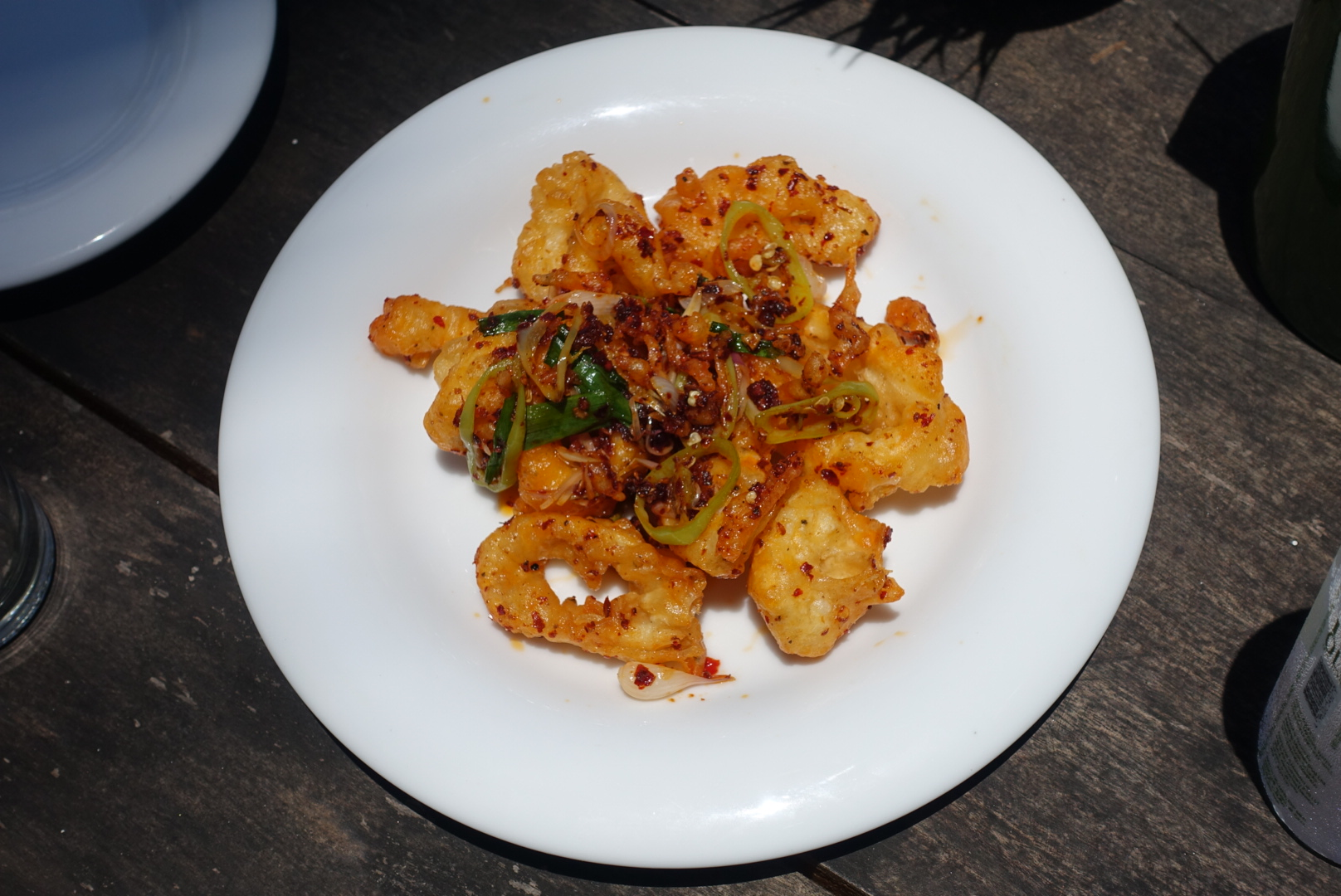
- Alternative names: HBC
- Course: Appetizer
- Place of origin: Sri Lanka
- Associated cuisine: Sri Lankan
- Created by: Sri Lankan Chinese
- Serving temperature: Hot
- Main ingredients: Cuttlefish
- Ingredients generally used: Flour, corn flour, butter, oil, chilli flakes, capsicum, spring onions
- Food energy (per 167 g serving): 656 kcal (2,740 kJ)
Nutritional value
(per 167 g serving)
- Protein: 59.1 g
- Fat: 30.8 g
- Carbohydrate: 31.1 g
- Similar dishes: Fried calamari

Hot butter cuttlefish (abbreviated HBC) is a signature Sri Lankan cuttlefish dish. The dish is served as a starter, or "bite," together with drinks, and is also accompanied with rice and other dishes as a part of a main course. While originally created as a Sri Lankan Chinese dish, the dish is now available island wide, especially in beachside restaurants. While similar to other batter fried cuttlefish and squid dishes, the blend of spices and aromatics used make the dish uniquely Sri Lankan.

== Preparation ==
Hot butter cuttlefish is prepared by removing the tentacles and scoring the body of the cuttlefish in a checkerboard pattern to get the pieces to "bloom" while frying. The scored cuttlefish is then cut into pieces, coated with a mixture of flour and corn flour, and deep fried in oil at a high heat. After they begin to turn golden, the pieces of cuttlefish are taken out and then stir fried together with generous quantities of butter, oil, chilli flakes, capsicums, and spring onions. For best results this should be served immediately and eaten as soon as possible.

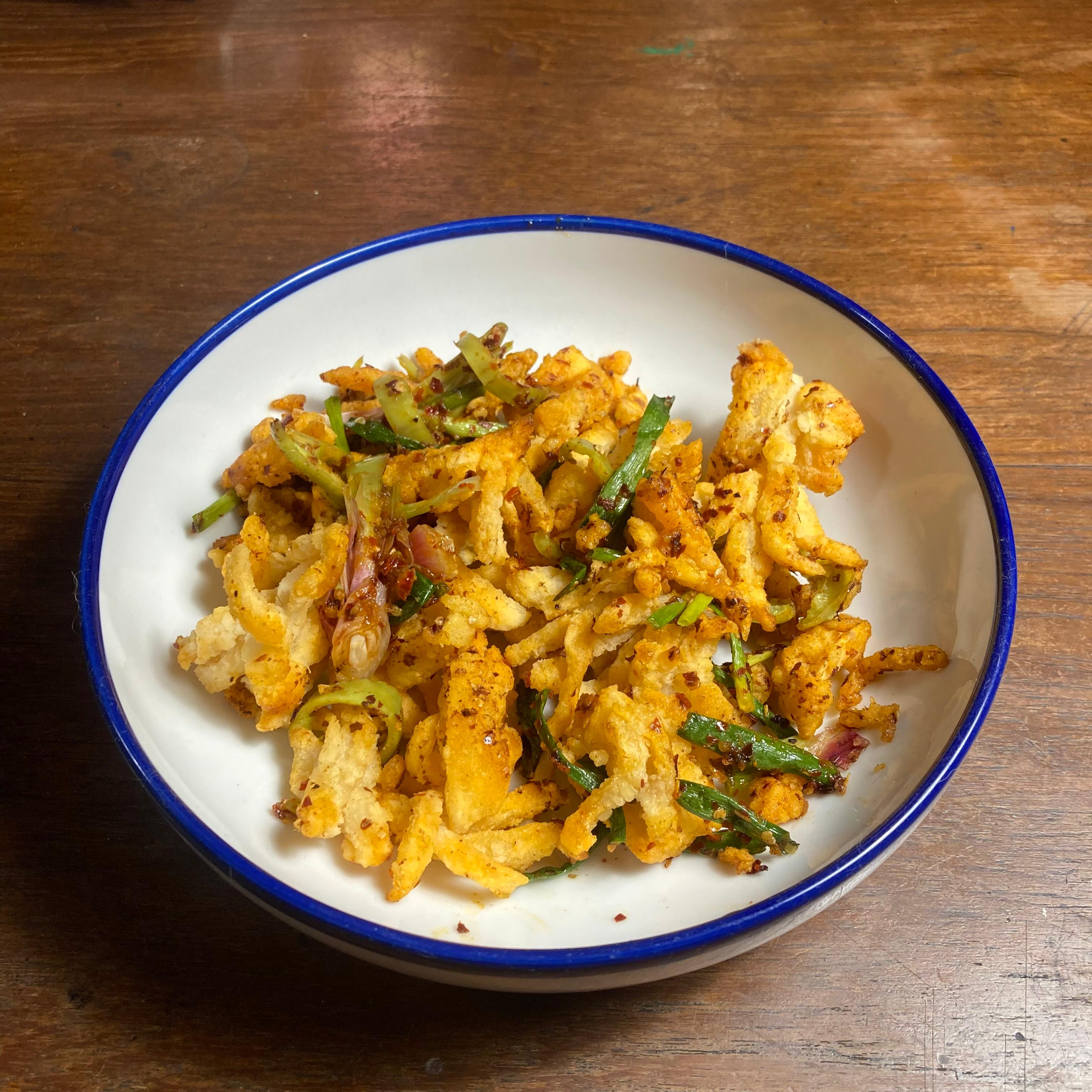
Hot butter cuttlefish in a bowl.

== Popularity ==
Hot butter cuttlefish is enjoyed across Sri Lanka. However as each restaurant will have minor variations in how they create and present the dish, reviewers compare and strive to find the "Best" hot butter cuttlefish served in a particular area. Expatriate Sri Lankan Chefs (such as Michelin Star winner Rishi Naleendra) cite hot butter cuttlefish as one of their favorite Sri Lankan dishes. This, together with the spread of Sri Lankan restaurant chains abroad (such as Chinese Dragon Cafe in Dubai, where HBC is a standout on the menu) means that Sri Lankan hot butter cuttlefish can now be found and enjoyed in many places across the globe.

== See also ==
- Sri Lankan cuisine
