= Aluwa =

Sri Lankan sweet

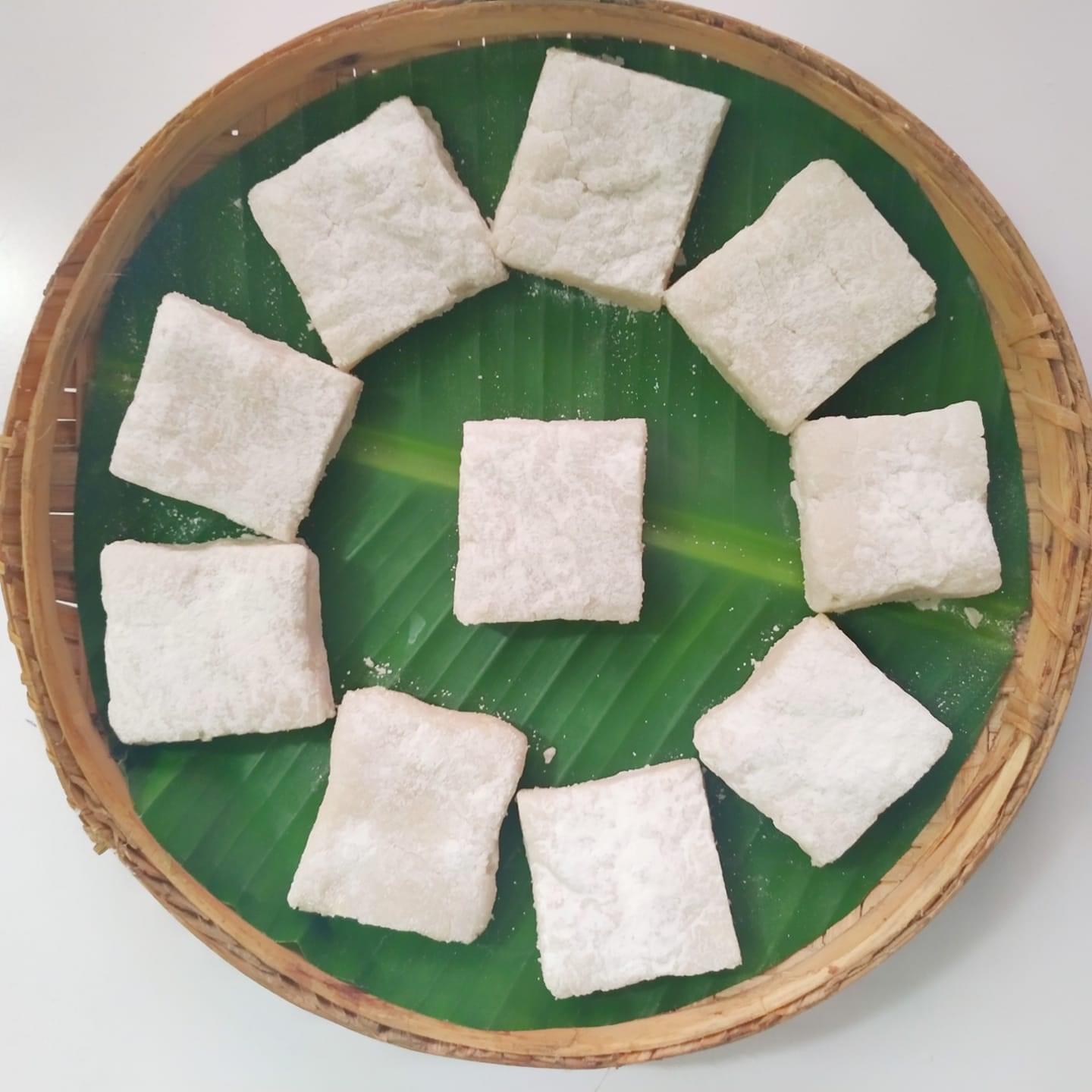
- Slices of aluwa served on a banana leaf.
- Course: Dessert
- Place of origin: Sri Lanka
- Serving temperature: Cooled
- Main ingredients: Treacle, Sugar, Rice flour
- Variations: Pani Aluwa, Seeni Aluwa, Meegamu Aluwa

Aluwa (Sinhala: අළුවා) is a Sri Lankan sweet. It is made from roasted rice flour or potatoes with boiled treacle, cashew nuts and cardamom and is served in a flat cookie-like form. Aluwa is traditionally served in diamond or square shapes by using a wooden mould.

== See also ==
- Halwa
