= Vaalai kai sambol =

Vaali kai sambol
- Alternative names: Vazhakkai sambol, ash plantain sambol, green banana fry sambol
- Course: Condiments
- Place of origin: Sri Lanka
- Serving temperature: Room temperature
- Main ingredients: plantain, onion, green chilies, salt, lime juice
- Food energy (per serving): 232 kcal (970 kJ)

Vaalai kai sambol (Sinhala: කොළ කෙසෙල් සම්බල්, Tamil: வாழைக்காய் சம்பல்), also known as vazhakkai sambol, ash plantain sambol, or green banana fry sambol, is a traditional Sri Lankan condiment. Vaalai kai means unripe plantain in Tamil.

Vaalai kai sambol is a sambol made of plantain, thick coconut milk, onion, green chilies, red chilies, mustard seeds, vinegar, salt and lime juice. Dry roasted red chilies, mustard seeds, vinegar, salt and sugar are ground to form a smooth paste. Green chilies and onions are chopped into fine pieces. The plantains are peeled and diced before being mixed with turmeric powder and salt. The diced plantains are deep fried in oil until they turn to light brown colour. The plantains, green chilies, onions, coconut milk and paste are then mixed together before serving.

== See also ==
- Sambal
- Cuisine of Sri Lanka
- List of banana dishes
