= Kiri hodi =

Food

- Type: Gravy or sauce
- Place of origin: Sri Lanka
- Main ingredients: Coconut milk, onion, turmeric, green chili, fenugreek

Kiri hodi (Sinhala: කිරි හොදි), which literally translates to milk curry, is a common traditional Sri Lankan fragrant coconut milk gravy. Made using a few basic ingredients, this dish is traditionally served hot alongside pol sambola (coconut relish) or idiyappam (rice noodles). Vegetables and fish can be added to the sauce to make a more substantial curry dish.

As with many traditional dishes, numerous variations can be found. Over generations, each family's kiri hodi will be slightly different from the next, mainly down to the proportion of spices and chilies used and the inclusion of additional ingredients, such as Maldives fish.

== Ingredients and preparation ==
Ingredients

Kiri hodi is typically prepared from four basic components: coconut milk, spices, onion and green chilies. The coconut milk, pol kiri, either in the form of miti kiri, the first thick milk extract from the coconut, or diya kiri, the thinner, watery subsequent extract, can be used. The main spices used in kiri hodi are uluhal (fenugreek seeds), cinnamon stick and kaha kudu (turmeric). The onions and fenugreek are added to give the necessary thickening or binding effect, whilst the turmeric gives this dish its unique yellow colour. Pandanus leaf (rampe) is often included as a flavour enhancer.

Preparation

The recipe for kiri hodi is relatively simple. The spices are heated first to release the aromas, with the other fragrant ingredients, onions, chili, garlic and curry leaves, then added. Once the spices for kiri hodi have been cooked, the coconut milk is added to give it a creamy texture and sweet taste to balance out the heat of the chilies. The mixture is then allowed to simmer until it thickens. it is then seasoned to taste with salt and lime juice.

Consumption

Kiri hodi is served hot often accompanying idiyappam (string hoppers), any mild pulao or rice. Kiri hodi is also used as a basic gravy recipe to make any mild curries, with the inclusion of boiled potatoes (ala kiri hodi), hard-boiled eggs (bittarai kiri hodi) or fish (malu kiri hodi).

== See also ==
- Coconut chutney
