= Shallot =

Variety of small onion

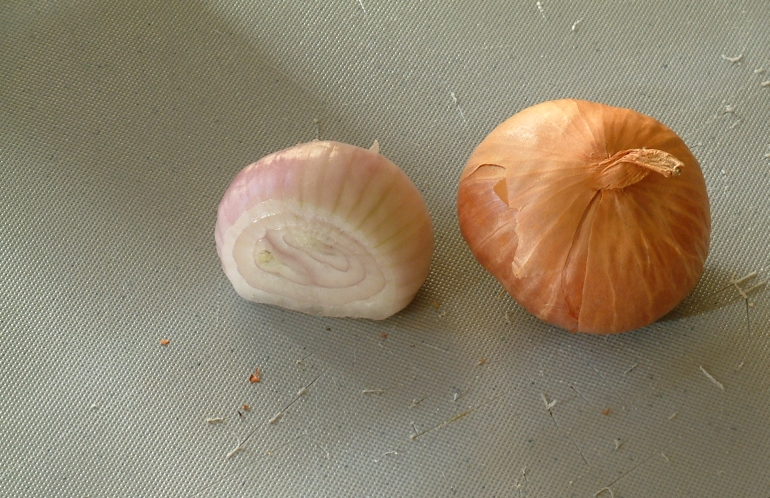
- Sliced and whole red shallots
- Species: Allium cepa (see text)
- Cultivar group: Aggregatum Group

The shallot (/ʃəˈlɒt/ or /ˈʃæ.lət/) is a cultivar group of the onion. Until 2010, the (French red) shallot was classified as a separate species, Allium ascalonicum. The taxon was synonymized with Allium cepa (the common onion) in 2010, as the difference was too small to justify a separate species.

As part of the onion genus Allium, its close relatives include garlic, scallions, leeks, chives, and the Chinese onion.

== Etymology and names ==
The names "scallion" and "shallot" are derived from the Old French eschalotte, by way of eschaloigne, from the Latin Ascalōnia caepa or Ascalonian onion, a namesake of the ancient city of Ascalon.

The term "shallot" is usually applied to the French red shallot (Allium cepa var. aggregatum, or the A. cepa aggregatum group). It is also used for the Persian shallot or musir (A. stipitatum) from the Zagros Mountains in Iran and Iraq, and the French gray shallot (Allium oschaninii), which is also known as griselle or "true shallot"; it grows wild from Central to Southwest Asia. The name shallot is also used for a scallion in New South Wales, Australia and among English-speaking people in Quebec, while the term "French shallot" refers to the plant referred to on this page. In most English-speaking nations, the name is pronounced with the emphasis on the last syllable in common with the French pronunciation, sha-LOT, while the emphasis is commonly made on the first syllable, SHAL-ət, in the United States.

The term "eschalot", derived from the French word échalote, can also be used to refer to the shallot.

== Description and cultivation ==
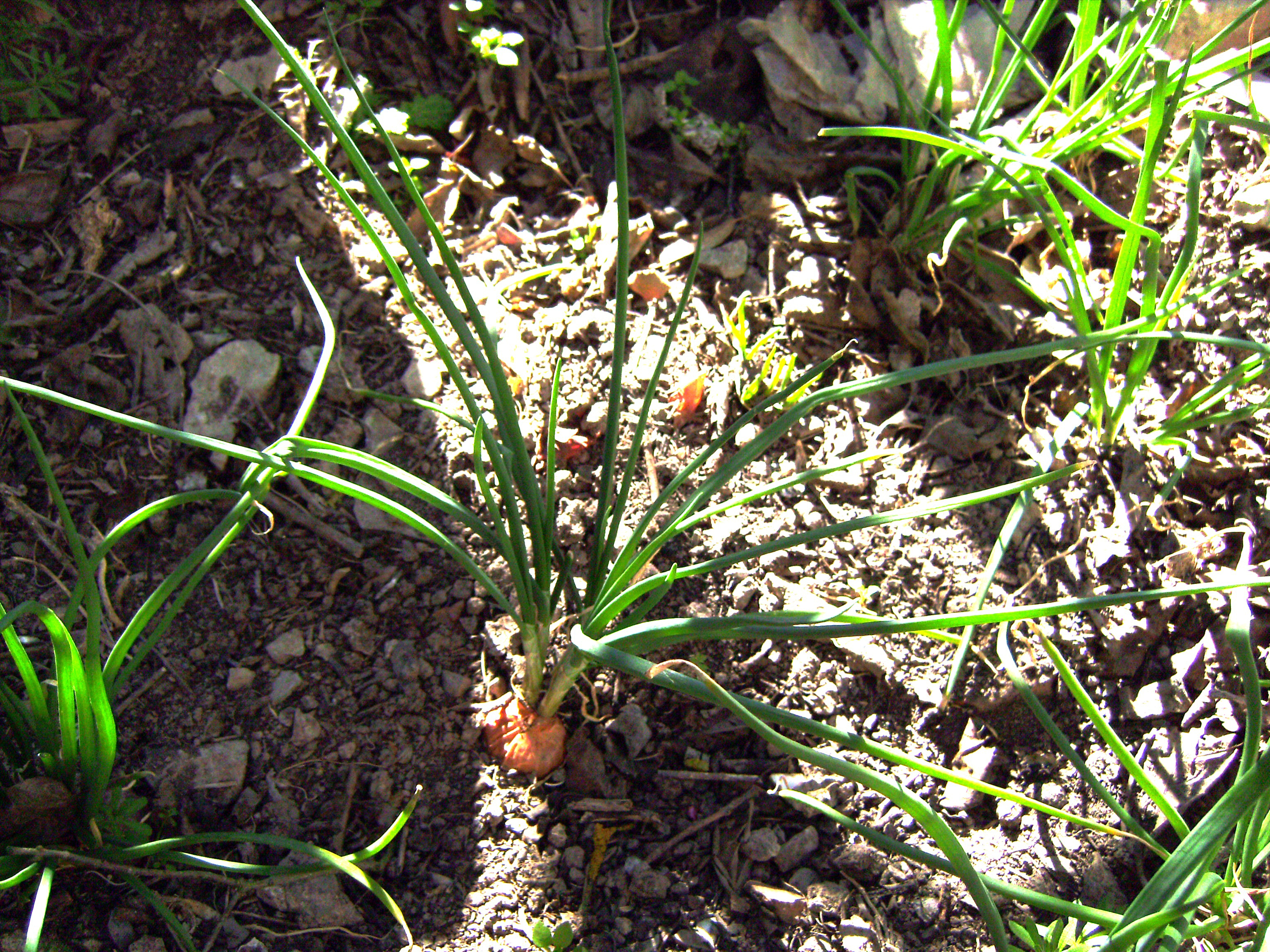
Shallot plant (A. cepa var. aggregatum) growing in Castelltallat, Spain

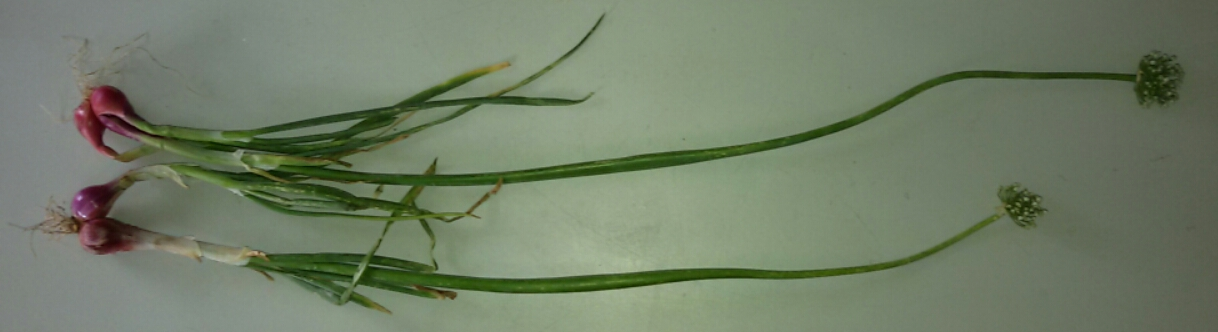
Whole shallot plants consist of roots, bulbs, leaves, stalks, and flowers.

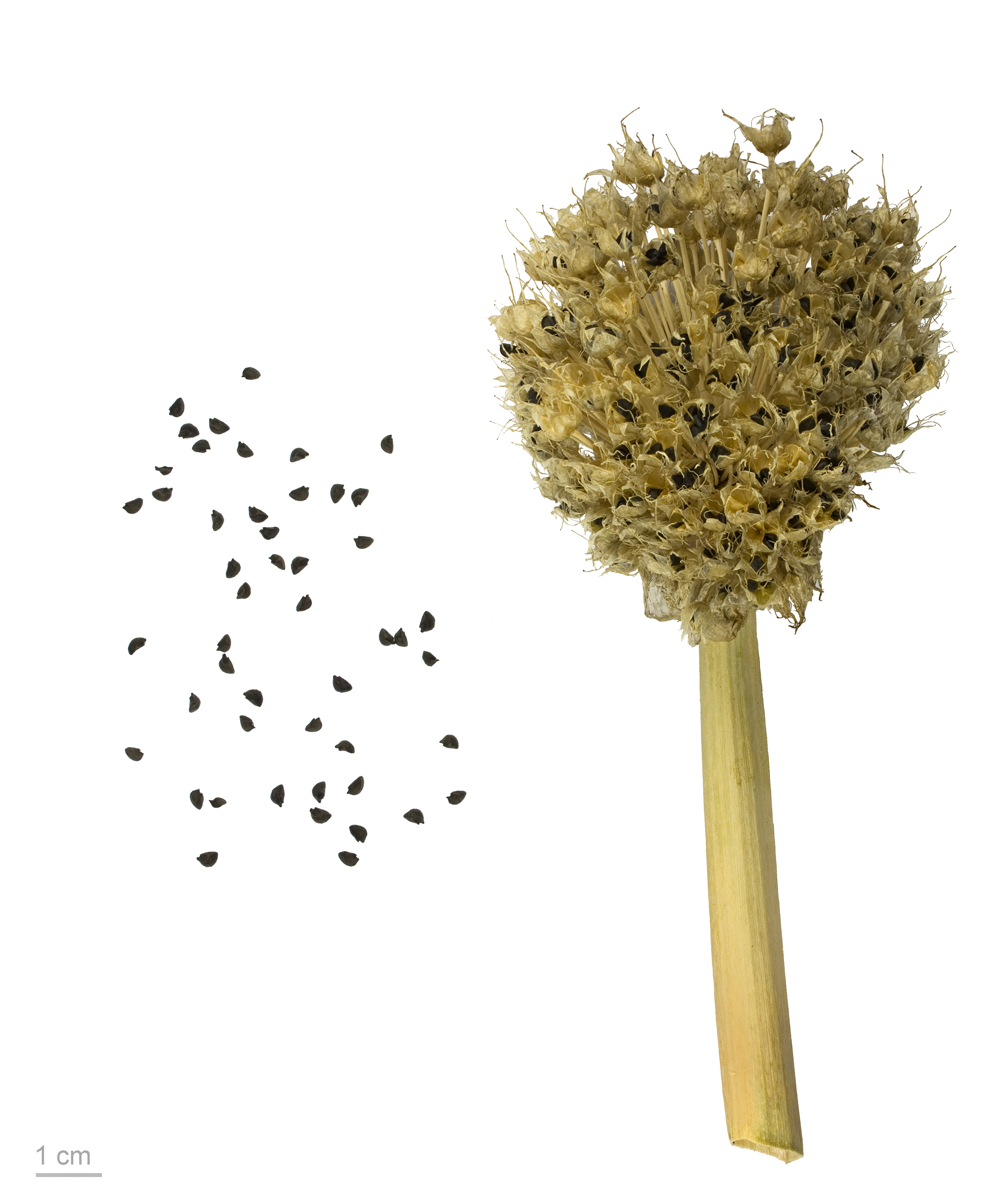
Shallot seeds

Like garlic, shallots are formed in clusters of offsets with a head composed of multiple cloves. The skin colour of shallots can vary from golden brown to gray to rose red, and their off-white flesh is usually tinged with green or magenta.

Shallots are extensively cultivated for culinary uses, propagated by offsets. In some regions ("long-season areas"), the offsets are usually planted in autumn (September or October in the Northern Hemisphere). In some other regions, the suggested planting time for the principal crop is early spring (typically in February or the beginning of March in the Northern Hemisphere).

In planting, the tops of the bulbs should be kept a little above ground, and the soil surrounding the bulbs is often drawn away when the roots have taken hold. They come to maturity in summer, although fresh shallots can now be found year-round in supermarkets. Shallots should not be planted on ground recently manured. Shallots suffer damage from leek moth larvae, which mine into the leaves or bulbs of the plant.

== Nutrition ==
A raw shallot contains 80% water, 17% carbohydrates, 2.5% protein and a negligible amount of fat (table). In a reference amount of 100 grams (3.5 oz), raw shallot supplies 72 calories and is a rich source of vitamin B_{6} (20% of the Daily Value, DV), while providing moderate amounts of manganese (13% DV) and potassium (11% DV). No other micronutrients occur in significant amounts (below 10% DV, table).

Shallots, raw
Nutritional value per 100 g (3.5 oz)
- Energy: 301 kJ (72 kcal)
- Carbohydrates: 16.8 g
- Sugars: 7.87 g
- Dietary fiber: 3.2 g
- Fat: 0.1 g
- Protein: 2.5 g
Vitamins and minerals
Vitamins	Quantity %DV^{†}
Thiamine (B1)	5% 0.06 mg
Riboflavin (B2)	2% 0.02 mg
Niacin (B3)	1% 0.2 mg
Pantothenic acid (B5)	6% 0.29 mg
Vitamin B6	20% 0.345 mg
Folate (B9)	9% 34 μg
Vitamin C	9% 8 mg
Vitamin E	0% 0.04 mg
Vitamin K	1% 0.8 μg
Minerals	Quantity %DV^{†}
Calcium	3% 37 mg
Iron	7% 1.2 mg
Magnesium	5% 21 mg
Manganese	13% 0.292 mg
Phosphorus	5% 60 mg
Potassium	11% 334 mg
Zinc	4% 0.4 mg
- Other constituents: Quantity
- Water: 80 g
- Link to USDA Database entry
- ^{†}Percentages estimated using US recommendations for adults, except for potassium, which is estimated based on expert recommendation from the National Academies.

== Uses ==
=== Culinary ===
Shallots are used in cooking. They may be pickled. Finely sliced, deep-fried shallots are used as a condiment in Asian cuisine, often served with porridge. Shallots taste similar to other cultivars of the common onion, but have a milder flavor. Like onions, when sliced, raw shallots release substances that irritate the human eye, resulting in production of tears.

Fresh shallots can be stored in a cool, dry area (0 to 4 °C, 32 to 40 °F, 60 to 70% RH) for six months or longer. Chopped, dried shallots are available.

=== Europe ===
In Europe, the 'Pikant', 'Atlas', and 'Ed's Red' cultivars of shallots are the most common.

=== Asia ===
Shallots are the traditional choice for many dishes in Sri Lankan cuisine, including pol sambola, lunu miris, and many meat, fish, and vegetable dishes.

In most Indian cuisines, the distinction between onions and shallots is weak; larger varieties of shallot are sometimes confused with small red onions and used interchangeably. Indeed, most parts of India use the regional name for onion interchangeably with shallot (Maharashtra, for instance, where both are called kanda). The southern regions of India distinguish shallots from onions in recipes more often, especially the much-loved, tiny varieties (about the width of a finger); these are widely used in curries and different types of sambar, a lentil-based dish. Shallots pickled in red vinegar are common in many Indian restaurants, served along with sauces and papad on the condiments tray. Fresh, they are also used as a home remedy for sore throats, mixed with jaggery or sugar. In Nepal, shallots are used as one of the ingredients for making momo.

In Kashmir, shallots are widely used in preparation of Wazwan Kashmiri cuisine, as they add distinct flavor and prevent curry from becoming black, which is common with onions.

In Iranian cuisine, shallots are used in various ways, the most common being grated shallot mixed into dense yogurt, a combination served in almost every restaurant when one orders grills or kebabs. Shallots are also used to make different types of torshi (ترشی), a sour Iranian side dish consisting of a variety of vegetables under vinegar, eaten with main dishes in small quantities. Shallot is also pickled—called shour (شور) in Persian—along with other vegetables to be served as torshi.

In Southeast Asian cuisines, such as those of Indonesia, Vietnam, Thailand, Cambodia, Malaysia, the Philippines, Singapore, and Brunei, both shallots and garlic are often used as elementary spices. Raw shallots can also accompany cucumbers when pickled in mild vinegar solution. They are also often chopped finely, then fried until golden brown, resulting in tiny, crispy shallot chips called bawang goreng (fried shallots) in Indonesian, which can be bought ready-made from groceries and supermarkets. Shallots enhance the flavor of many Southeast Asian dishes, such as fried rice variants. They are also often present in noodle and slaw dishes. Crispy shallot chips are also used in southern Chinese cuisine. In Indonesia, shallots are sometimes pickled and added to several traditional foods; the pickles' sourness is thought to increase the appetite. In the southern Philippines, shallot bulbs and leaves are used to make the popular spicy Maranao condiment called palapa, which is used in the dish piaparan.

The tubular green leaves of the plant can also be eaten and are very similar to the leaves of spring onions and chives.

== Gallery ==
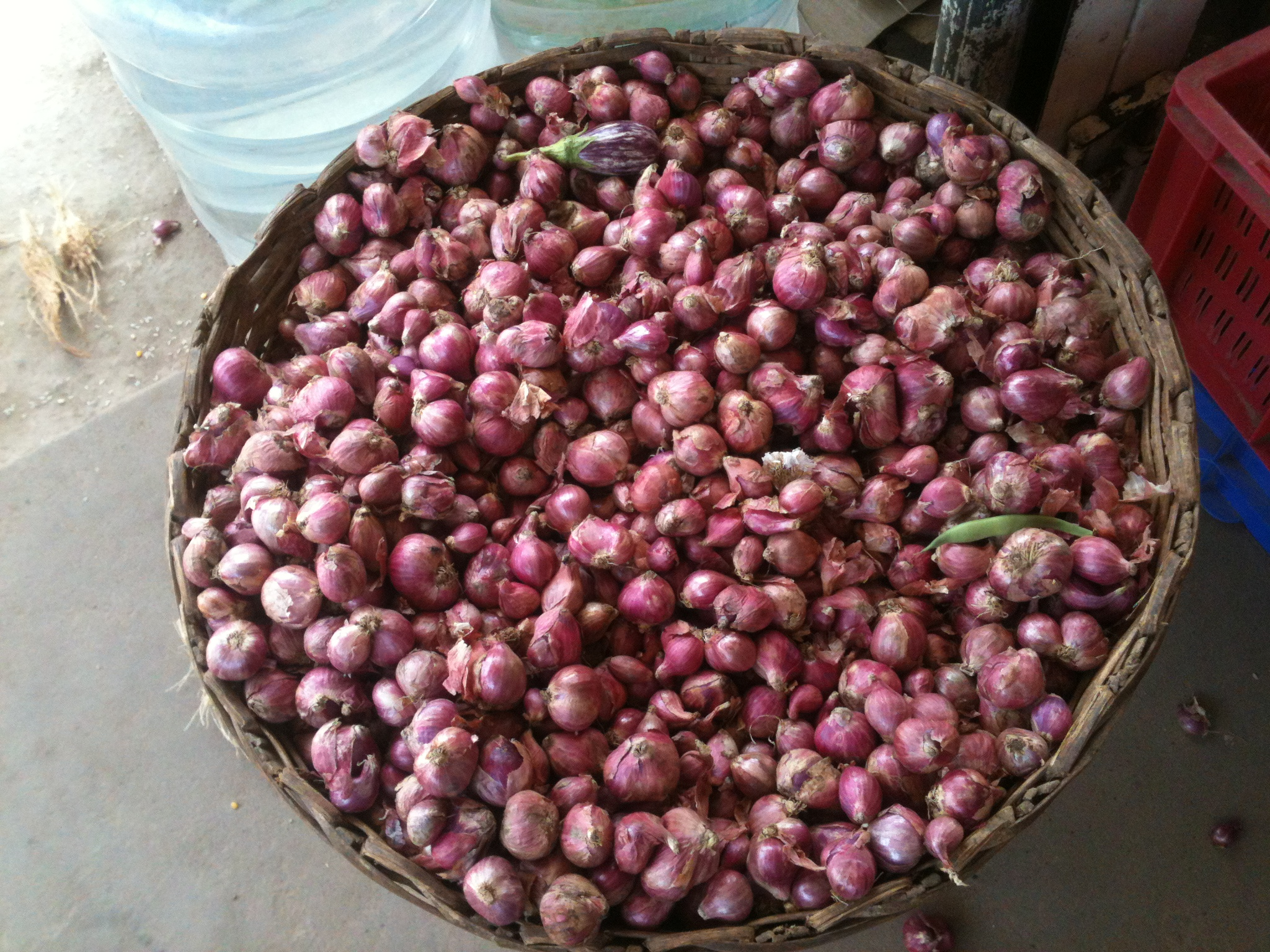
Shallots for sale in India

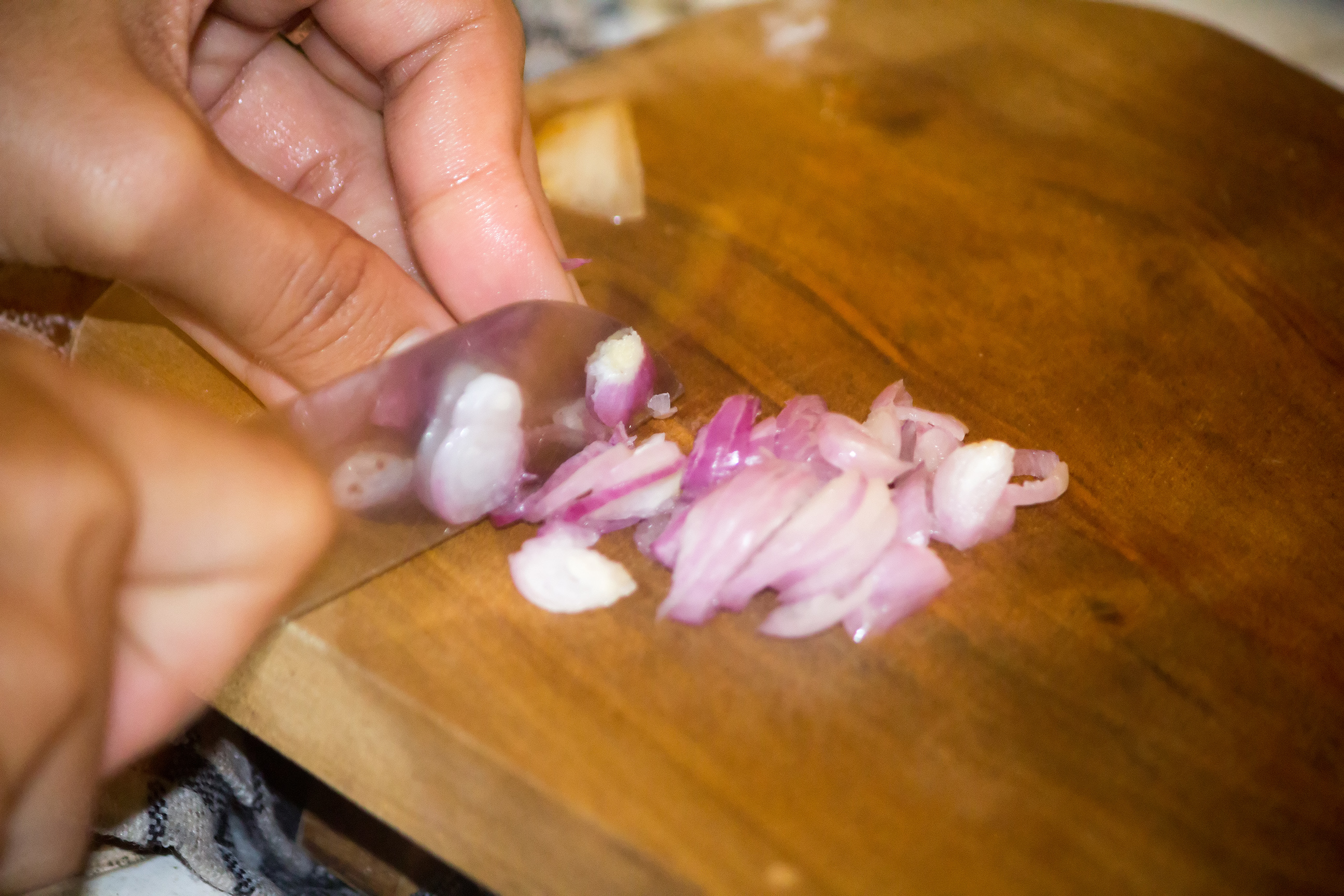
Shallots being chopped for satay

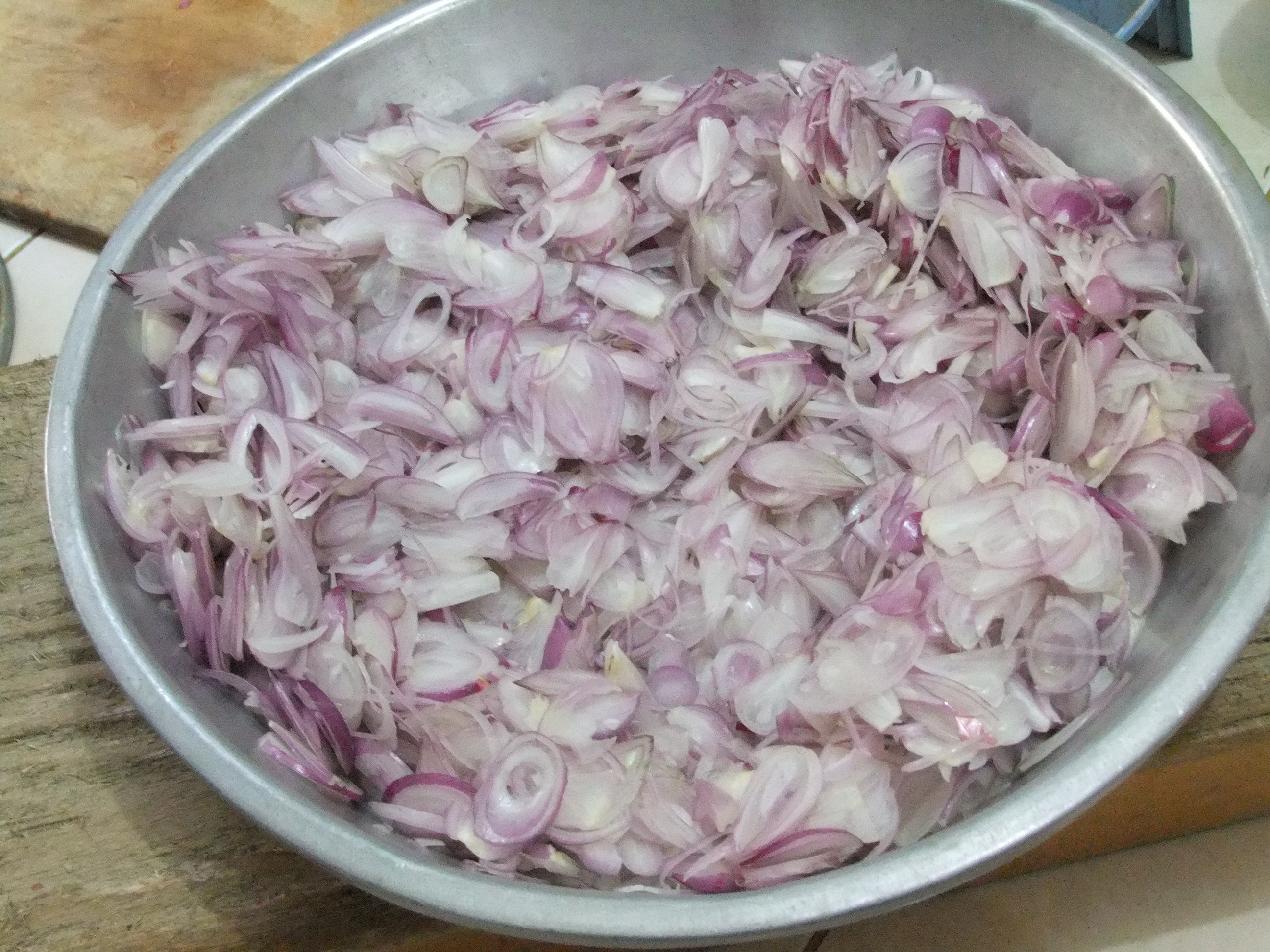
Sliced shallots for bawang goreng in Indonesia

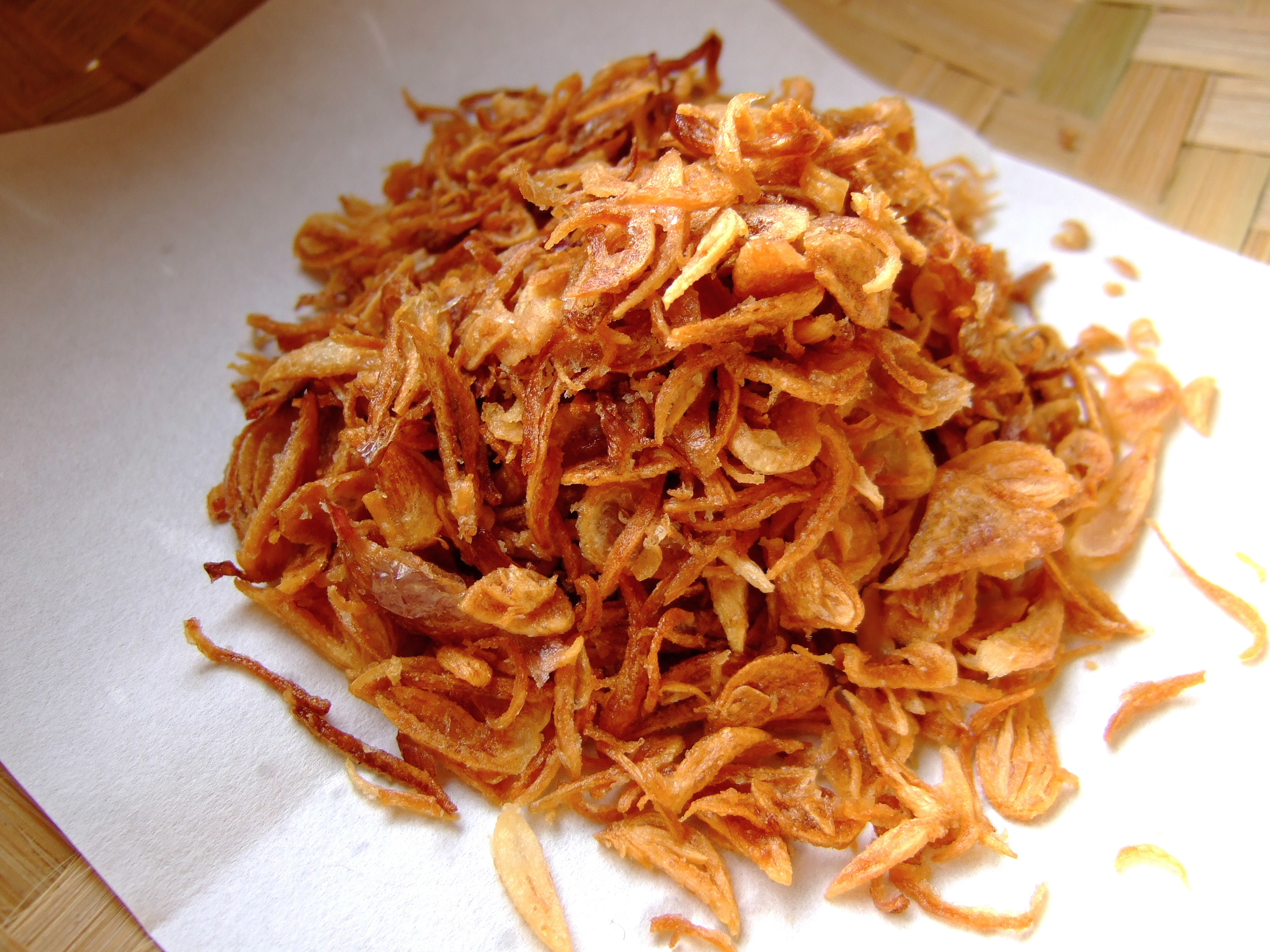
Bawang goreng, consisting of crispy, deep-fried shallots, is a popular garnish in Indonesian cuisine.

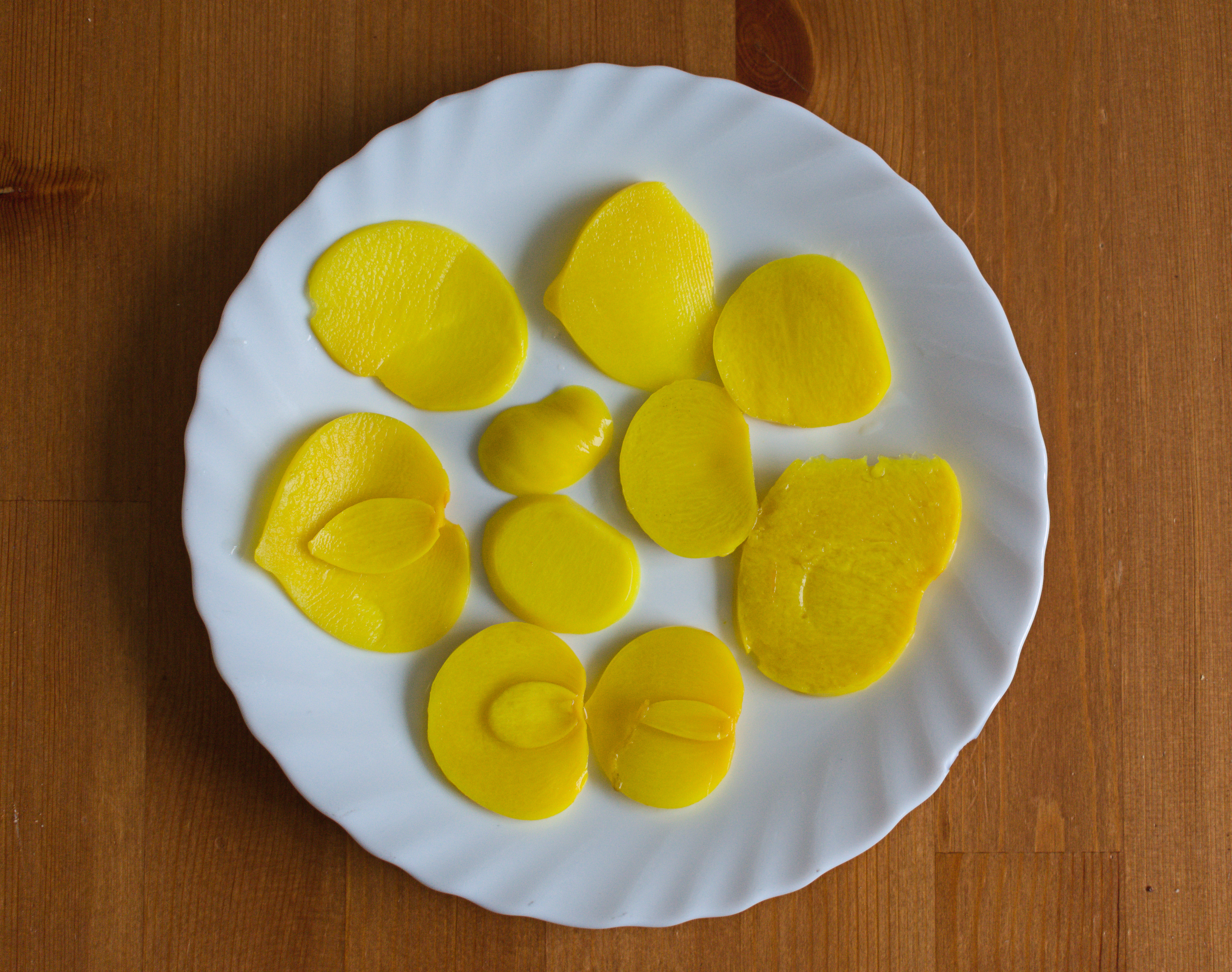
Pickled shallots

== See also ==
- Scallion
