= Traditional rice of Sri Lanka =

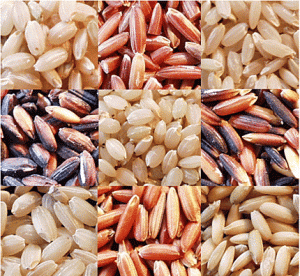

Rice in Sri Lanka has played an important role in the country's functioning and survival for centuries as a major staple food. Rice continues to be a staple of traditional Sri Lankan cuisine today.

== History ==
=== Early history ===
Sri Lankan people may have started cultivating rice as early as 800 B.C., according to documentary evidence. Further evidence of early rice cultivation is the construction, since 390 B.C., of massive irrigation structures, reservoirs, and interconnected canals. From ancient times, rice cultivation was not only an economic activity, but a way of life for the people of Sri Lanka and sometimes considered sacred. Some varieties of rice have been passed down for generations, and are called traditional, indigenous, or heirloom.

Once renowned as the granary of the east, Sri Lanka offered more than 2000 indigenous rice varieties to the rest of the world.The process remained sustainable due to the methods used for production, as well as the sanctity associated with the process of rice cultivation.

=== Rise of the new rices ===
By the 1980s, 90% of the farmland in Sri Lanka was being used to cultivate the "semi-dwarf" (newly improved) rice variety.

Currently, 95% of the rice produced in Sri Lanka are hybrid varieties. These are harvested using non-organic fertilizer and pesticides which are needed to produce larger harvests with lower costs.

However, traditional rice is gradually making a comeback. This is due to increased global demand for organic food.

== Traditional rices ==
=== Suwandel ===
Suwandel translates into "Fragrant" or "Scented" and is sometimes spelt Suwadel

Its milky taste makes Suwandel a common choice for festive occasions and ceremonies. Nutritionally, the rice consists of 90% carbohydrates, 7% crude protein, 0.7% crude fat, and 0.1% crude fiber. Suwandel is known to contain higher amounts of glutamic acid and vitamins than other, more common rice varieties.

Suwandel is an heirloom rice variety, cultivated organically with traditional rain-fed methods in the southern lowlands of Sri Lanka. Because of this, cultivation takes longer than other varieties of rice. It is usually 3 months before harvest.

=== Kalu Heenati ===
Kalu Heenati is literally translated as "dark, fine grain." It is a highly nutritious red rice that is considered to be good for daily consumption. It contains a lot of medicinal properties. It is very good for lactating mothers. It enhances sexual potential and physical strength.

=== Maa-Wee ===
This is a reddish-brown rice variety with a unique texture. It is low in carbohydrates, and rich in protein and fiber. Ma-Wee is also proven to have a 25% to 30% lower glycemic index (GI) than other common rice varieties. It is 84.5% carbohydrates, 9.4% protein, 3.6% fat, and 1.1% fiber.

Ma-Wee rice is best when soaked prior to boiling. One traditional dish calls for the rice to be cooked with chopped spring onion and leeks, and served with bottle gourd sautéed in spices and coconut milk.

Ma-Wee was loved by the queens of Sri Lanka, who believed it helped them maintain a trim, shapely figure.

Ma-Wee is also revered for its historical importance in religious ceremonies. According to folklore, Ma-Wee has been placed in the caskets of sacred relics and the pinnacle (kotha) of dagobas.

=== Pachchaperumal ===
The word "Pachchaperumal" means "The Lord Buddha’s color." It is a red rice variety. When cooked, it takes on a deep, rich burgundy color. It is rich in nutrients and proteins. It is also said to be part of a good diet for people with diabetes and cardiovascular disease.

Pachchaperumal has long been considered a divine rice in traditional Sinhalese culture. Traditionally, it was often used in alms-giving.

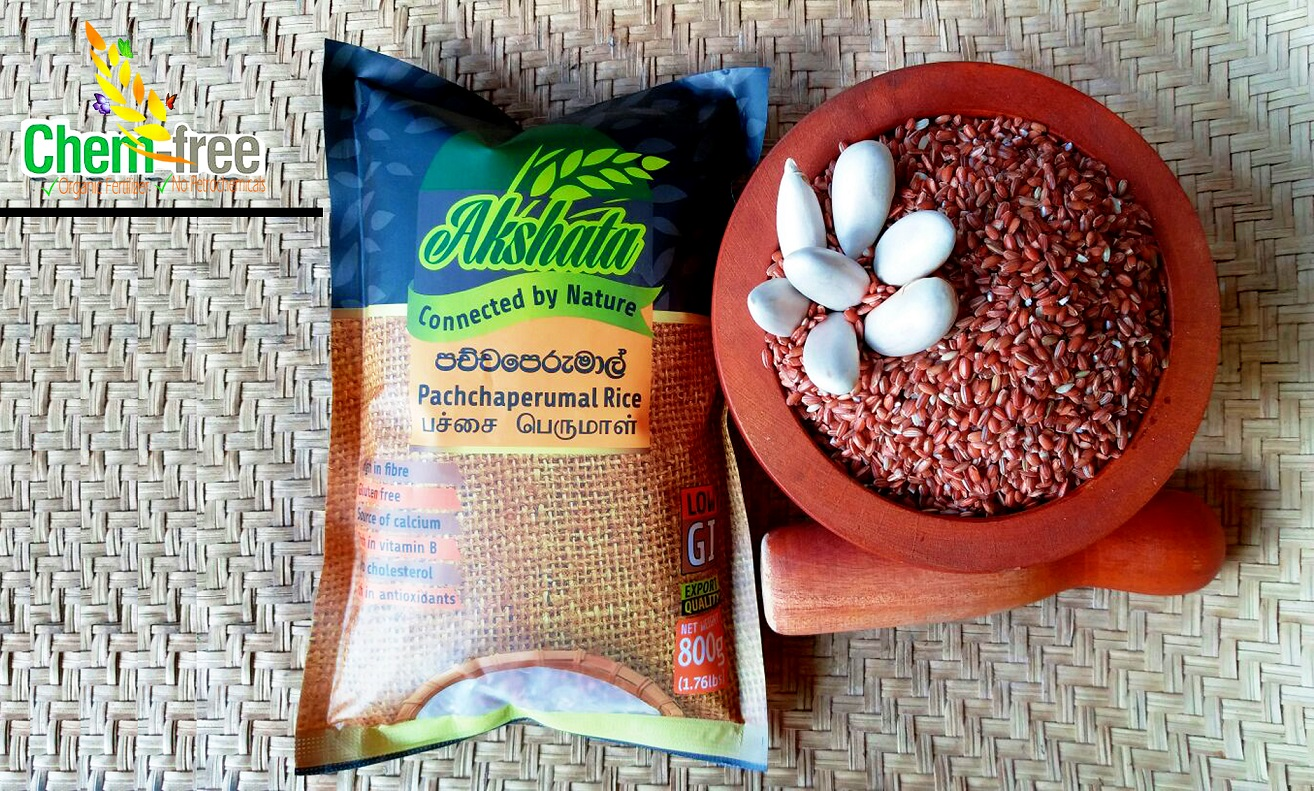
Traditional Sri Lankan rice

=== Kuruluthuda ===
Kuruluthuda is a red rice variety rich in proteins and fiber that is known for its unique taste.

=== Water Lilly Rice ===
This is also known as Olu Sahal. Olu rice is one of the staple foods of the Hela diet.

=== Others ===
Other varieties include Rathdel, Madathawalu, and Hetadha Wee.

== Culture ==
Rice has a sacred association among Buddhist, Hindu, and Muslim populations alike. It is said that rice cooked with coconut milk was the first offering made to Buddha, and to this day the dish is a staple of Sri Lankan Buddhist culture during sacred festivals and important events.
