= Bolo fiado =

Sri Lankan layer cake

Bolo Fiado
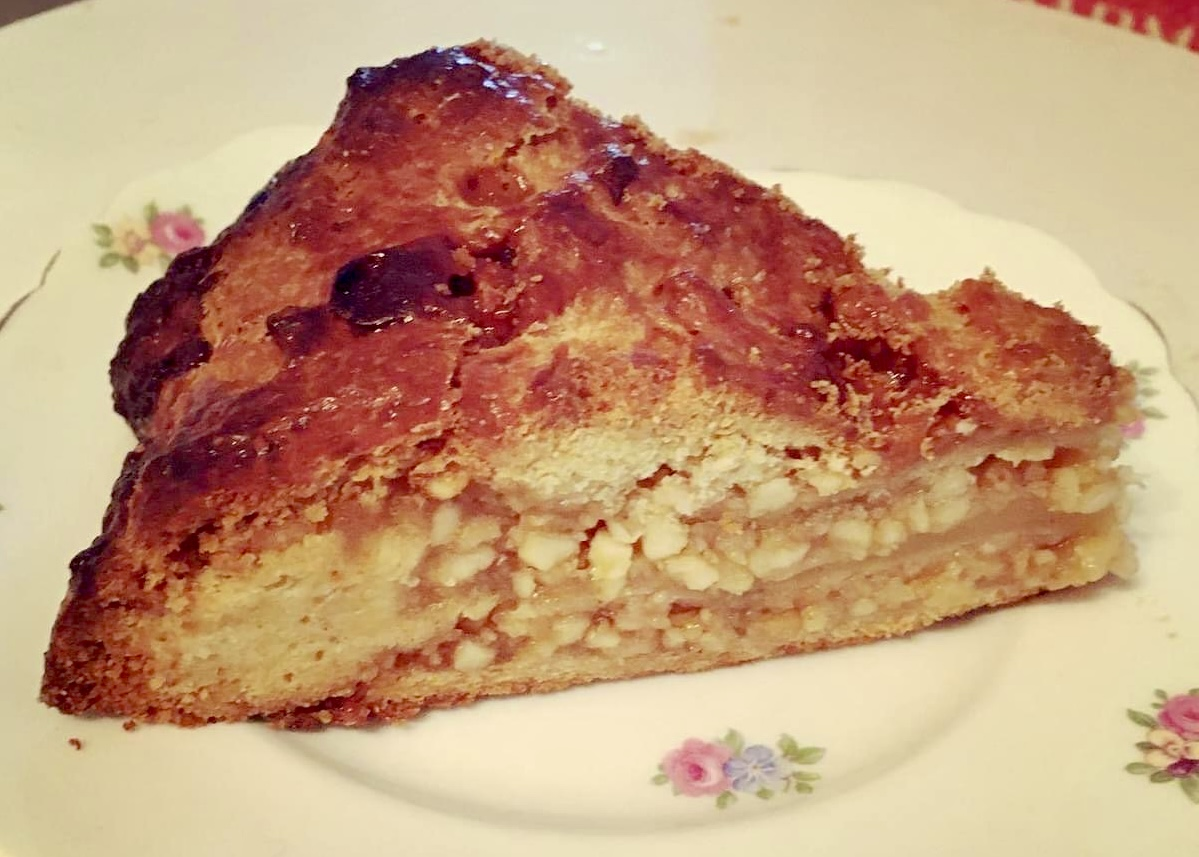
- Type: Layer cake
- Place of origin: Sri Lanka
- Main ingredients: Flour, sugar, eggs, cashew nuts, icing, vanilla extract, rose water
- Variations: Pumpkin preserve

Bolo Fiado, or Bolo Folhado (Sinhala: බොලෝ ෆියාඩෝ), is a Sri Lankan laminated/layer cake. It is made of sweet pastry layers, alternating with a cashew nut, sugar and rose water filling. It has the appearance of a thick Mille-feuille or large Danish pastry.

== History ==
The cake was introduced by the Portuguese but has evolved into a confectionery unique to Sri Lanka. The original recipe of Bolo Fiado dates back to the 16th century, when the Portuguese controlled the coastal areas of the country. Its name has Portuguese origins, bolo is Portuguese for cake, and folhado meaning a leaf or sheet. It has since been adapted by the Burgher community. One of the first literary mentions of Bolo Fiado was in Hilda Deutrom's Ceylon Daily News Cookery Book, published in 1929.

== Composition ==
Bolo Fiado is made with a type of shortcrust pastry, consisting of flour, water, butter, egg yolks and sugar, which are folded into layers. The filling traditionally consists of sugar water, cashew nuts (known as cadju in Sri Lanka) and rose water. Variations to the filling include the use of preserved or crystallised ash pumpkin (puhul dosi), rasins and spices.

== See also ==
- Cashew pie
- Danish pastry
- Love cake
- Medovik
