= Lunumiris =

Spicy Sri Lankan sambal paste

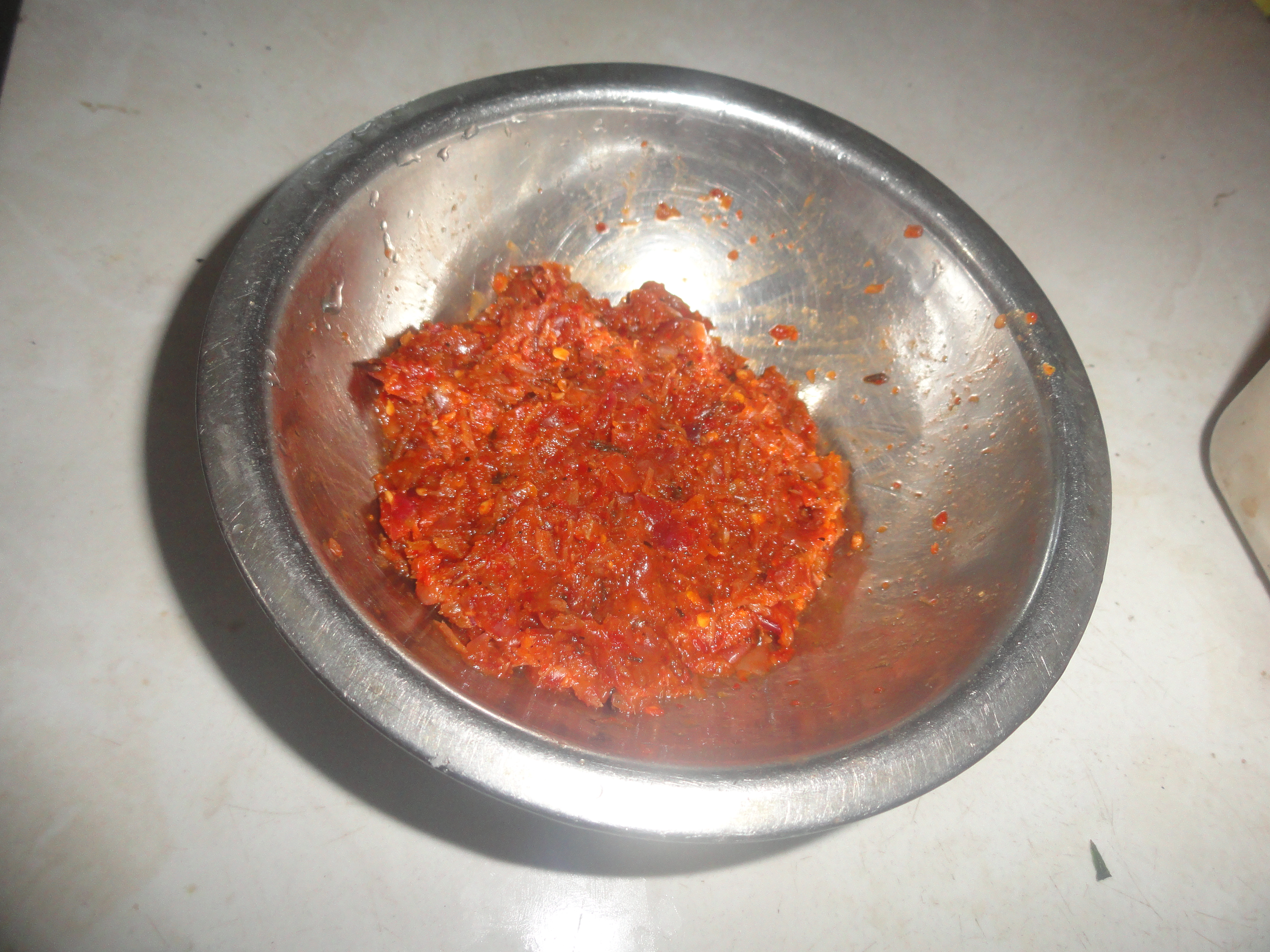
- A dish of Lunumiris
- Type: Sambal
- Course: Condiment
- Place of origin: Sri Lanka
- Main ingredients: Chili and Onions

Making of Lunumiris

Lunumiris (Sinhala:ලුණු මිරිස් [lunu-miris] means salt and chillies in Sinhalese. Traditionally it is made with ground chillies and salt mixed together into a paste. Some also refer it as katta sambol, but katta sambol is a different condiment. Katta sambol (Sinhala:කට්ට සම්බෝල [kaṭṭa sambōla]) is a spicy Sri Lankan sambal served as a condiment. It consists of chili pepper, shallots, Maldives fish, sea salt, black pepper, and lime juice, usually ground with a mortar and pestle or a grind stone.

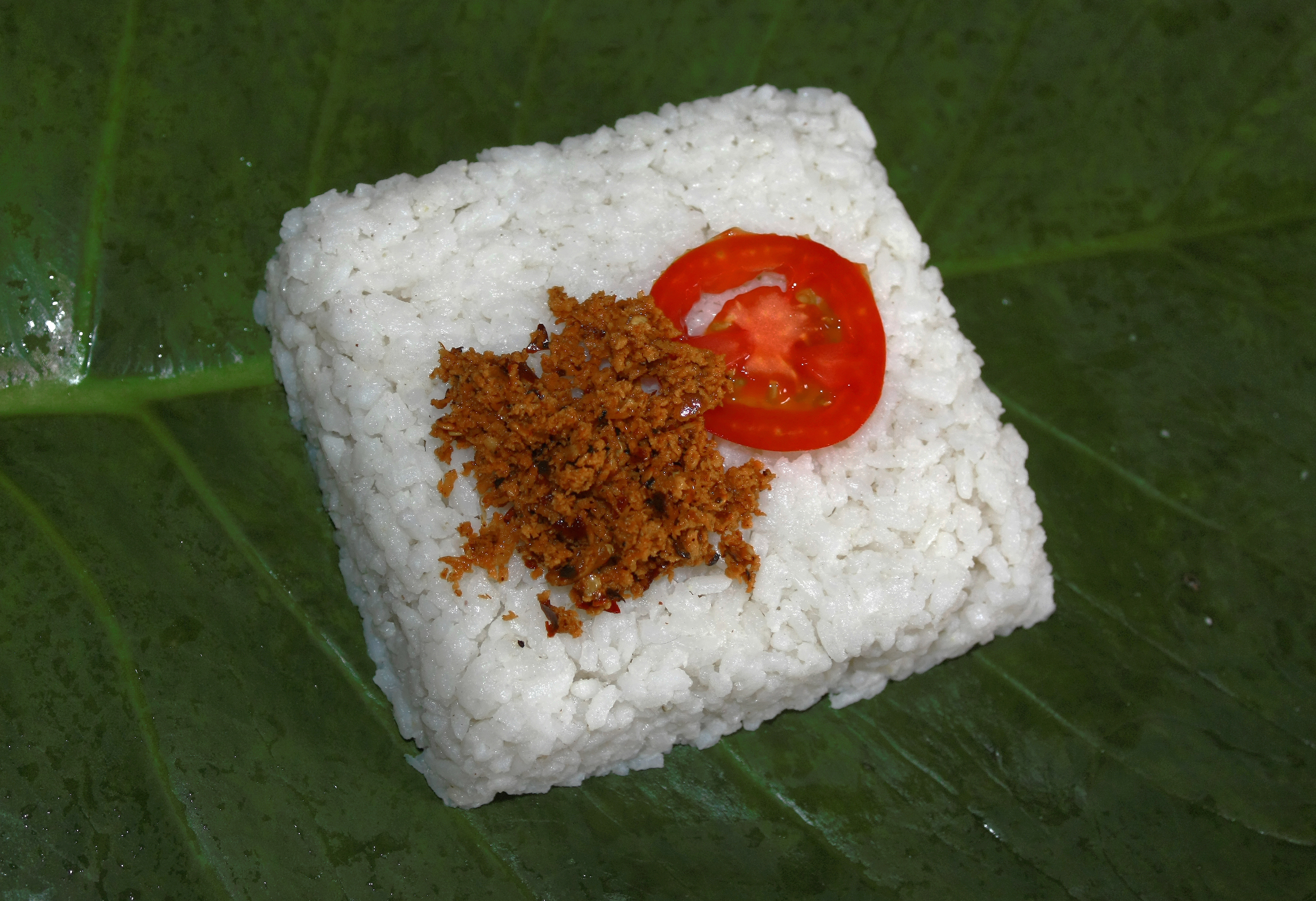
Lunumiris with Kiribath

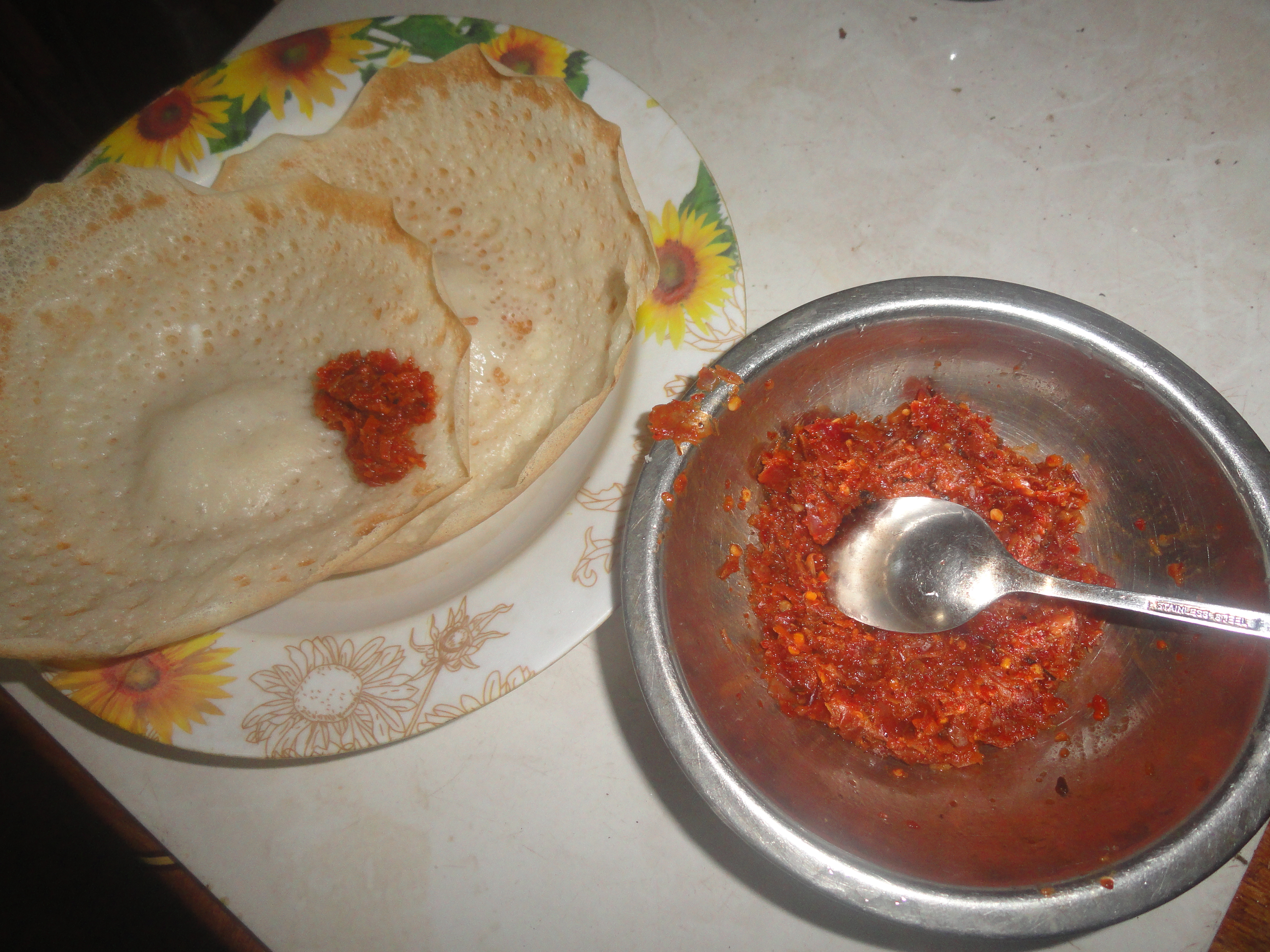
Lunumiris with Appam

== Etymology ==
The translation of Sinhala word lunumiris loosely translates to salt chili in Sinhala. That is because the original version of lunumiris was made only with chili powder, and salt.

== Usage ==
Usually Kiribath, appam, bread, rice and roti can be eaten with Lunumiris. This can be eaten with almost any food as a side dish.

== Ingredients ==
Lunumiris contains chili pepper, shallots, Maldives fish, sea salt, black pepper and a little bit of lime juice. This can be made vegetarian, without Maldives fish. This type is hot but wet, and a little crispy because of the shallots. This should be made with mortar and pestle, or grind stone. This can be made also with hands, but it doesn't give the real taste.

The original version of this condiment is made only with chili powder, sea salt, and lime juice. It is spicy and balances out with salt and lime. This can be made by hands.
