= Pol sambol =

Sri Lankan dish made from coconut

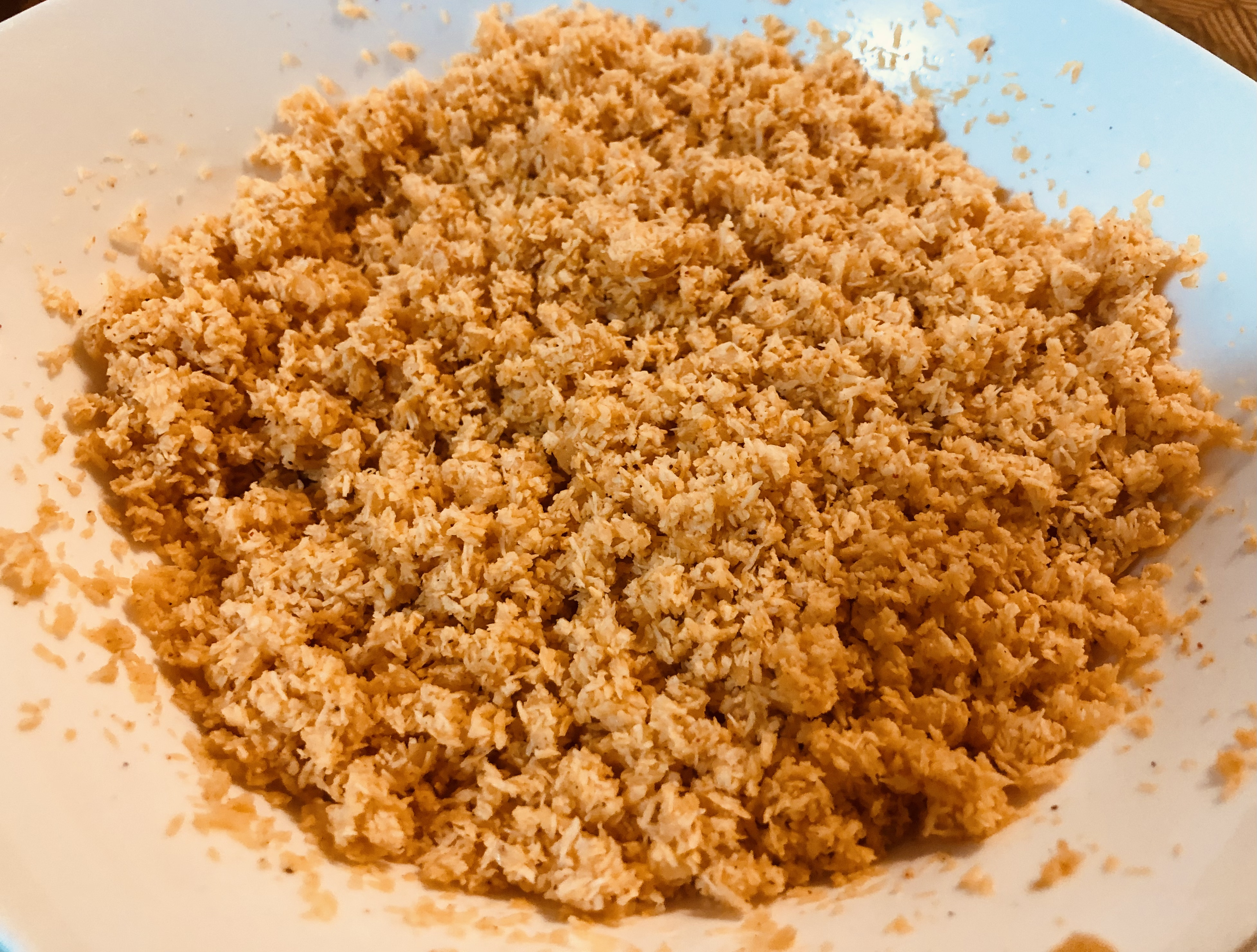
- Traditional pol sambol
- Alternative names: Pol sambol, thengai sambal, coconut sambol
- Course: Condiments
- Place of origin: Sri Lanka
- Serving temperature: Room temperature
- Main ingredients: coconut, red onion, chillies, salt, lime/lemon
- Variations: Maldives fish

Pol sambol (Sinhala: පොල් සම්බෝල), or thenkai sambal (Tamil: தேங்காய் சம்பல்), is a traditional Sri Lankan dish made from coconut, mostly used as an accompaniment with rice, string hoppers, hoppers and curries. It is a coconut relish, consisting of freshly grated coconut, shallots, dried whole chilies or chili powder, lime juice, and salt.

Traditionally the ingredients are ground on a rectangular block of granite with a granite rolling-pin, known as a miris gala (Sinhala: මිරිස් ගල). Alternatives include the use of Maldives fish (umbalakaḍa), a smoked and cured tuna, that is sold in chips or flakes. A variation can be made by sautéing the pol sambol in mustard seeds, curry leaves and sliced onion, which is called badapu pol sambol (sautéed pol sambol).

== See also ==
- Serundeng
- Cuisine of Sri Lanka
- Thenga chammanthi
