= List of Sri Lankan sweets and desserts =

This is a list of notable Sri Lankan sweets and desserts. Sri Lanka is well known throughout South Asia for sweets and desserts originating from there. Desserts are usually served as part of main meals, whereas sweets are consumed at tea times. Many Sri Lankan desserts and sweets contain domestic spices, jaggery and kithul (Caryota urens) treacle. Locally-made treacle and jaggery are the most common sweeteners.

== Desserts ==
| Name | Image | Main ingredients | Description |
|---|---|---|---|
| Watalappam | | Coconut milk, jaggery (kittul treacle), eggs, spices (cardamom, cloves) | The most popular dessert among Sri Lankan Muslims during Ramadan. Commonly served at weddings, parties and other special ceremonies. |
| Buffalo curd | | Buffalo milk, starter culture | Popular in southern Sri Lanka for weddings, alms, and as a household dessert. This is often served with kithul treacle. |
| Semolina and jaggery pudding | | Semolina, jaggery, milk, spices cinnamon, nutmeg, vanilla | A less common dessert. |
| Avocado Cream | | Avocado, sugar, cream | Household dessert often offered in restaurants. |
| Kirala (Lumnitzera littorea) fruit milk | | Kirala fruits, treacle | A dessert drink popular in southern Sri Lanka. |
| Kithul flour pudding | | Kithul flour, coconut milk, jaggery or sugar, spices | A popular dessert among Sinhalese people, offered in some small restaurants. |
| Wood apple milk | | Wood apple, coconut milk, sugar | A very popular dessert drink. |
| Pudding of dulya | | Eggs, milk, bread crumbs, sugar, vanilla | Similar to bread pudding. Used for special occasions. |
| Sago pudding | | Sago, sugar, milk, eggs | This is popular among all communities in Sri Lanka. Mostly offered at Tamil weddings and cultural festivals. |

== Sweets ==
Commonly used ingredients across traditional Sri Lankan sweets are rice flour, treacle and coconut milk. Treacle is a syrup made from the sap of "tapped" blossoms of palm trees, usually coconut (Cocos nusifera) or kithul (Caryota urens).

| Name | Image | Main ingredients | Description |
|---|---|---|---|
| Aasmi | | Rice flour, coconut milk and the juice of cinnamon leaves | Deep fried but served cooled. Popular treat served at Sinhalese New Year and special events. |
| Aggala | | Kithul treacle, rice flour, pepper | Spicy sweet. Mostly prepared for tea time in villages. |
| Aluwa | | Rice flour, sugar, milk, butter, spices (cardamom, cloves) | Popular among Sinhalese. Served at cultural festivals. |
| Athirasa | | Rice flour, treacle, coconut milk | A very popular and culturally important Sinhalese sweet. Diamond or round shaped batter deep fried in hot oil. |
| Bibikkan | | Semolina, raisins, treacle, rice flour, scrapped coconut, spices and flavours | Similar to fruit cake. |
| Dosi | | Fruit, sugar, water | candied fruit |
| Green Gram cake (Mung Kevum) | | Rice flour, mung flour, treacle, ghee, spices | A popular Sinhalese sweet fried in oil often used at cultural events. |
| Halapa | | rice flour, kurakkan flour | It's usually wrapped in a leaf. |
| Kalu Dodol | | kithul jaggery, rice flour, coconut milk, and cashew nuts | Sri Lankan dodol. Household sweet, usually served at tea time and special events. Prepared by boiling coconut milk and kithul jaggery in a large pan (thachi) and adding rice flour, cashew nut and spices to the reduced mix. |
| Kesari bhath | | Rava, cardamon, sugar, ghee | A South Indian sweet now very popular among Tamils, who cook it for celebrations. |
| Kevum (Oil Cake) | | Rice flour, treacle, coconut milk | A very popular Sinhalese sweet. Fried in hot oil pan individually. The small bump at top gives the name "konda" (tied hair). |
| Kiri aluwa (milk toffee) | | Condensed milk, sugar, cashew nuts, cardamom | soft milk toffee. |
| Kokis | | Rice flour, coconut milk | Crispy biscuit-like of Dutch origin. |
| Lavariya | | Rice flour, Pol Pani | Soft string hoppers filled with caramelised coconut. |
| Popo (coconut balls) | | Coconut, sugar, flour, essence | Used in rituals and for special events. |
| Sowboro | | Flour, sugar, rulan, scraped coconut, butter and salt | Popular biscuit among Sinhalese, available in village boutiques and fairs. |
| Thala guli | | Sesame seed, desiccated coconut, jaggery, salt | |
| Undu Walalu/Undu Wal or Pani Walalu | | Urad bean flour and kithul treacle | Crispy tubes filled with kithul treacle. Looks a bit like an earthworm. |
| Weli Thalapa | | Rice flour, grated coconut, kithul or coconut treacle, spices | Household sweet, usually served at tea time. Prepared in a two step process, by first preparing pittu with rice flour and then mixing with kithul or coconut treacle. |

== See also ==
- Sri Lankan cuisine
- List of desserts
