= Lavariya =

- Alternative names: Sweet stuffed string hoppers
- Type: Breakfast, Afternoon tea
- Region or state: Sri Lanka
- Associated cuisine: Sri Lankan cuisine
- Main ingredients: Rice flour, grated coconut, jaggery
- Ingredients generally used: Moong dal, Cardamom powder

Lavariya (Sinhala: ලැවරියා) is a popular traditional Sri Lankan sweet dumpling. It is essentially caramelised coconut wrapped in a string hopper (Idiyappam). It is usually served at breakfast or in the afternoon with tea and bananas.

== Preparation ==
The dish is prepared by mixing rice flour with hot water, oil and seasoned with salt. It is then kneaded into a smooth dough. The dough mixture is used to fill an 'idiyappam' press or a sieve and the thin vermicelli-style noodles are pressed out onto banana leaves. The filling (Pol Pani) is a mix of grated coconut with moong dal and jaggery syrup, which is then placed inside the rice flour noodles in the shape of a half moon, then wrapped in banana leaves and steamed before serving.

== See also ==
- Sri Lankan cuisine
- String hoppers
- Pol Pani
- Kozhukkatta
