= Athirasa =

Sweet in Sri Lankan cuisine

Athirasam (Tamil old name Amutharasam or Athiraha) [(Sinhala: අතිරස) means extremely tasty)] is a sweet in Sri Lankan cuisine. It is a sweet-cake of jaggery and rice flour made into a paste flattened into circles and fried. Athirasa is also famous in India for Diwali. Athirasa is served on festive occasions along with other sweets such as Kavum, Kokis, and Aluwa.
