= Aggala =

Traditional Sri Lankan sweet

- Course: Dessert
- Place of origin: Sri Lanka
- Serving temperature: Cooled
- Main ingredients: Rice, coconut, jaggery, pepper

Aggala (Sinhala: අග්ගලා) are a traditional Sri Lankan sweet. They are essentially sweet roasted rice balls, made from rice, coconut, jaggery or treacle and pepper.

Traditionally sun-dried boiled rice is ground into a powder (alternatively rice flour can be used) and mixed with fresh shredded or desiccated coconut, shaved jaggery (which can be substituted with kithul treacle or sugar), pepper and water until it forms a thick paste. The mixture is then rolled into small balls, and coated with rice powder or flour. Other recipes include the addition of cinnamon into the mixture and coating the balls with roasted sesame seeds. They are eaten as snacks.
