= Aasmi =

Traditional Sri Lankan deep-fried sweet snack

- Alternative names: Asmi, Aasmee
- Course: Dessert
- Place of origin: Sri Lanka
- Serving temperature: Cooled
- Main ingredients: rice flour, coconut milk, cinnamon leaves, sugar
- Variations: okra juice
- Food energy (per serving): 96 kcal (400 kJ)

Aasmi (Sinhala: ආස්මී) is a traditional Sri Lankan deep-fried sweet snack, which is served on Aluth Avurudda/Puthandu (the Sinhalese/Tamil New Years), weddings and birthdays.

It is made with a combination rice flour and coconut milk, which is mixed with juice extracted from davul kurundu leaves (cinnamon leaves) and then deep fried in coconut oil. Okra juice is often used as a substitute for kurundu. It is then rested for a few days before deep fried again and topped with jaggery or sugar syrup mixed with food colouring.
