= Thala guli =

Sri Lankan confectionery

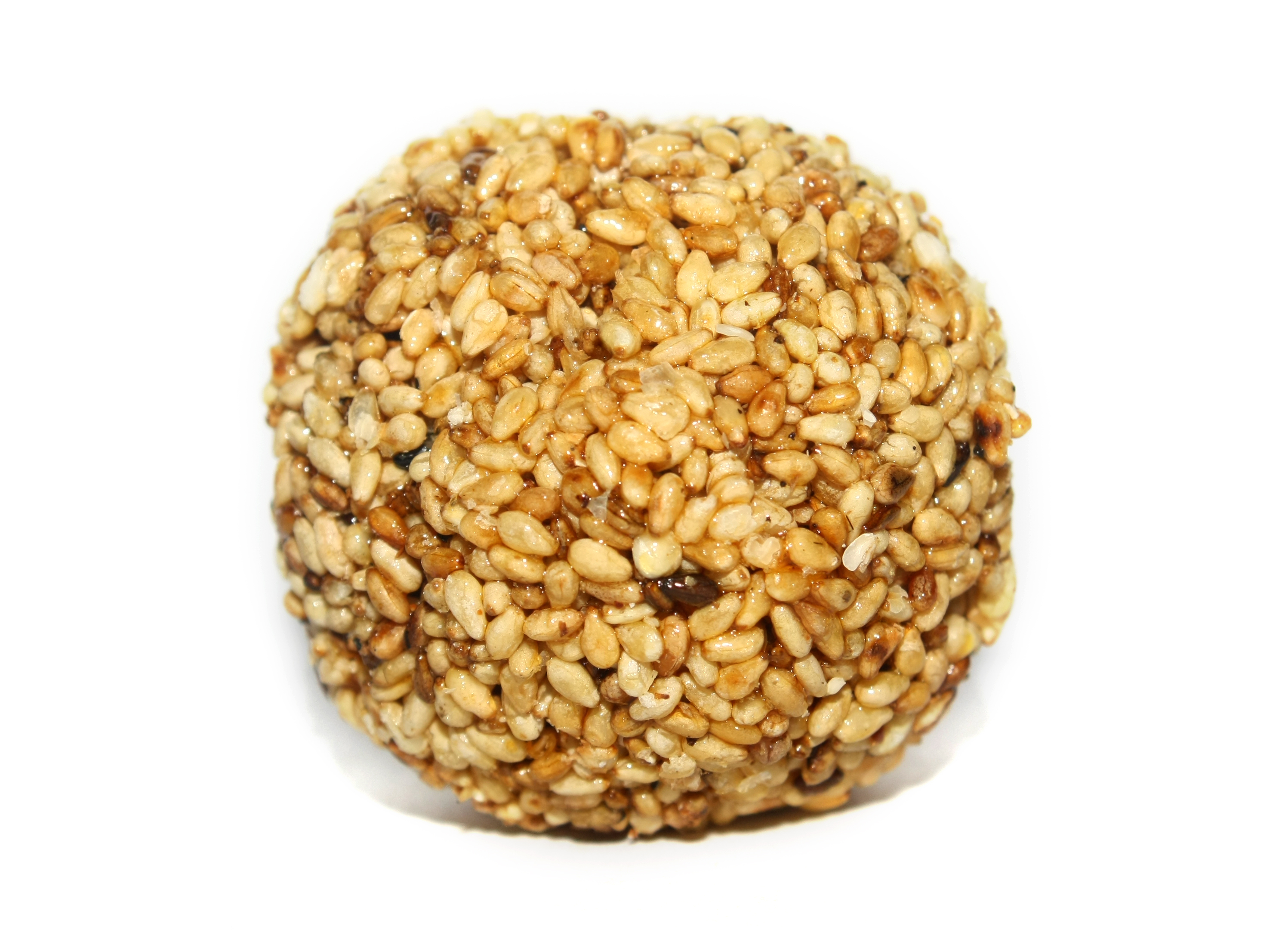
- Alternative names: Thala bola, gingelly balls, gingili balls, ellu urundai, ellurundai
- Course: Snack
- Place of origin: Sri Lanka
- Serving temperature: Cooled
- Main ingredients: Sesame seeds, desiccated coconut, jaggery, salt
- Variations: Dates, roasted peanuts

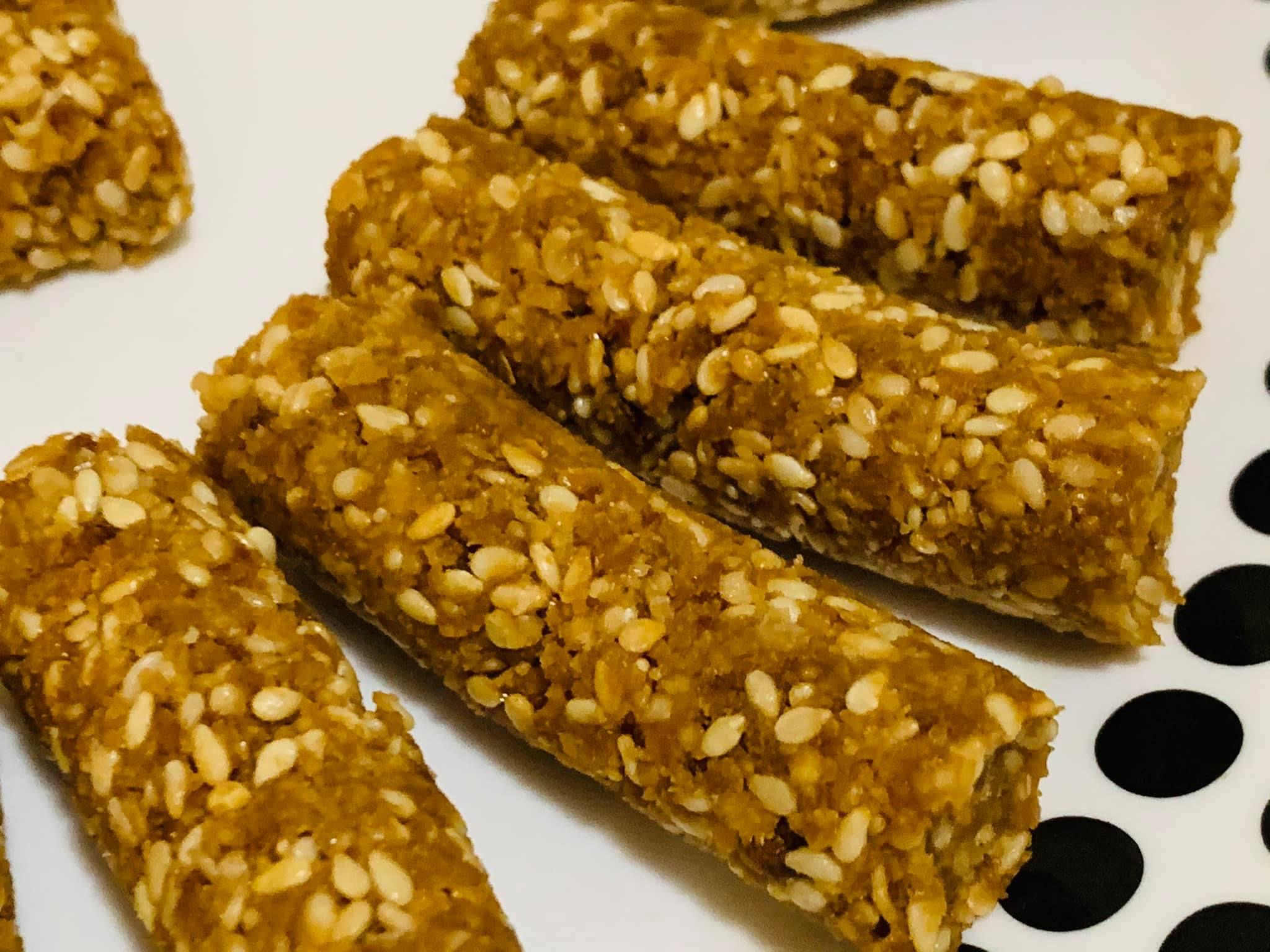
Thala guli

Thala guli ('tah-lah 'goo lee) (Sinhala: තල ගුලි) also known as thala bola, gingelly or gingili balls or rolls, are traditional Sri Lankan sweetmeats, made with sesame seeds, desiccated coconut, jaggery (palm sugar) and salt. Thala means 'sesame' in Sinhala and guli or bola refers to whether they are made in the shape of a cylinder or a ball. In northeast Sri Lanka, they are known as ellu urundai or ellurundai (Tamil: எள்ளுருண்டை) which in Tamil translates as 'sesame balls'.

== Ingredients and preparation ==
Ingredients

Thala guli is typically prepared from four basic components: white sesame seeds, desiccated coconut, jaggery and salt. Common variations to the traditional recipe include using dates (such as Medjool) or peanuts. Where jaggery is unavailable, unrefined sugars, such as muscovado sugar, can be used as a replacement.

Preparation

Separately dry-roast the sesame seeds and desiccated coconut until they are golden brown. Grind the sesame seeds with salt in a mortar with a pestle, until the crushed seeds are oily. Grate the jaggery into the mixture and grind. Add the roasted coconut and continue to grind. The mixture is then shaped by hand and molded into small balls or rolls. Warm kithul treacle, sesame oil, coconut oil or ground dates are often used as binding agents if the mixture is not pliable enough to form balls or rolls.

Consumption

They can be arranged on a serving plate; however, they are traditionally wrapped in pieces of white crêpe, waxed or baking paper with fringes at their ends. The paper is then twisted on either side of the balls or rolls so they look like miniature bonbons or Christmas crackers. They are served at the end of a meal, or as a snack between meals.

== See also ==
- Jian dui
- Laddu
- Sesame seed candy
