= Kiri aluwa =

Popular soft toffee in Sri Lanka

Kiri Aluwa
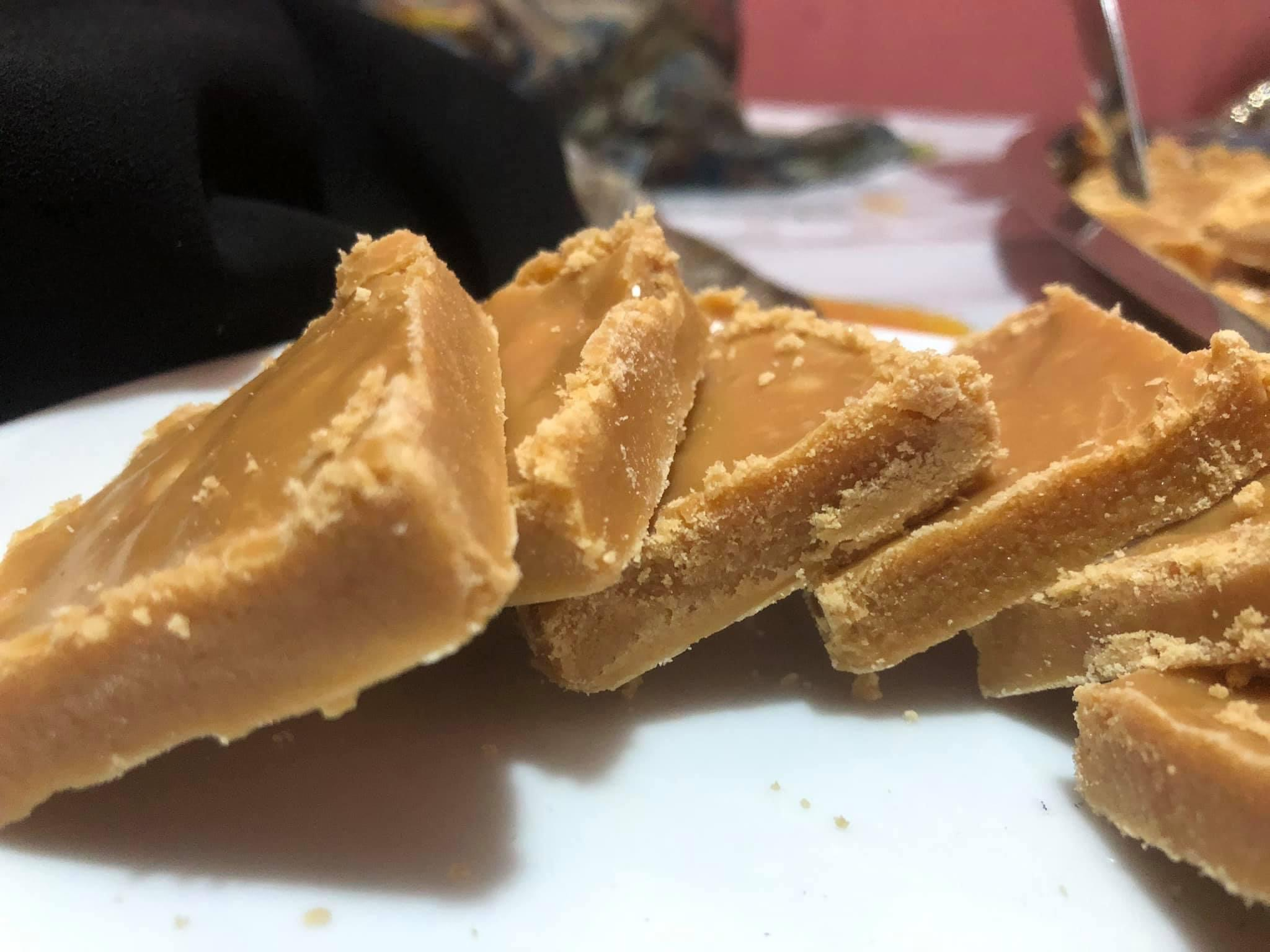
- Alternative names: Kiri toffee, milk toffee
- Course: Dessert
- Place of origin: Sri Lanka
- Region or state: Sri Lanka
- Serving temperature: Cooled
- Main ingredients: Condensed milk, sugar, cashew nuts, cardamom
- Food energy (per serving): 2,334 kcal (9,770 kJ)

Kiri Aluwa (Sinhala: කිරි ටොෆී), also known as milk toffee or kiri toffee, is a popular traditional Sri Lankan soft, crumbly toffee.

These soft caramelised milk confectionery come in the shape of little squares/diamonds, where the size varies according to tradition. The principal ingredients are sweetened condensed milk, sugar and butter, they are often flavored with a variety of spices including cinnamon, cardamom or sea salt. Other variations include the addition of cashews and raisins.

It is similar to the Scottish sugary confection, tablet, which was first identified in the early 18th century. Other close dishes include the Québécois Sucre à la crème, the South American tableta de leche and the Dutch borstplaat. It is likely that the dish evolved from bonda aluwa, a combination of coconut, rice flour and jaggery - which was combined and rolled into a sausage shape and wrapped in plantain leaves.

== See also ==
- Fudge
- Kalakand
- Sucre à la crème
- Tablet
- Toffee
