= Kevum =

Sri Lankan sweet

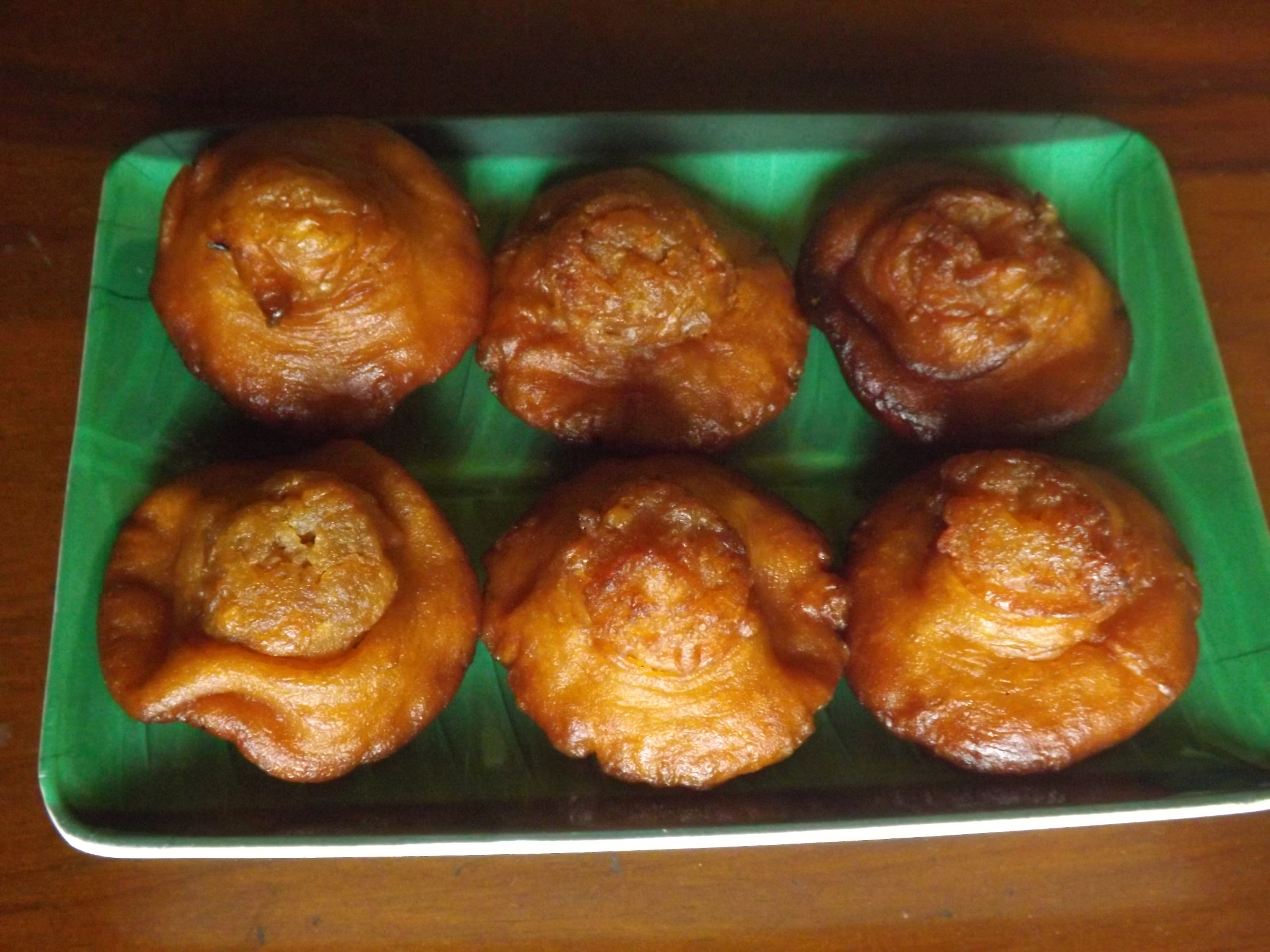
- Konda kavum
- Type: Sweet
- Course: Dessert
- Place of origin: Sri Lanka
- Main ingredients: Rice flour, treacle

Kevum or kavum (Sinhala: කැවුම්) is a deep-fried Sri Lankan sweet made from rice flour and kithul (sugar-palm) treacle, with a number of variants adding additional ingredients. It is also known as oil cake. Kevum is traditionally given and consumed during celebrations of Sinhala and Tamil New Year.

== History ==
Kevum is mentioned in ancient Sri Lankan texts including the Ummagga Jatakaya, Saddharma Ratnawaliya and Pujawaliya.

== Varieties ==
The Dhathuwansaya, an ancient Sinhala text, mentions 18 kinds of kevum including Sedhi Kevum, Mun Kevum, Ulundu Kevum, Uthupu (shaped using a coconut shell) and Ginipu (fire kevum).

- Konda kevum (Sinhala: කොණ්ඩ කැවුම්) - hair kevum is the most common variant. It has a dark reddish color. The dough of rice flour and kithul treacle is flavored with salt and cardamom. Konda (Sinhala: කොණ්ඩ) is the Sinhala word for hair, and is named so as the shape of the konda kevum resembles hair tied up into a bun. It is shaped by hand and without a special mold.
- Naran kevum (Sinhala: නාරං කැවුම්) - mandarin kevum is the size and shape of a mandarin, colored yellow with saffron. Green gram flour and scraped coconut are added to the basic kevum mix of rice flour and treacle.
- Thala kevum (Sinhala: තල කැවුම්) - sesame kevum has sesame in the kevum dough.
- Undu kevum (Sinhala: උඳු කැවුම්) - dal kevum is kevum flavored with urad dal.
- Mun kevum (Sinhala: මුං කැවුම්) - gram kevum adds green gram flour and saffron to the kevum mix of rice flour and treacle. The kevum are diamond shaped and yellow.
- Handi kevum (Sinhala: හැඳි කැවුම්) - spoon kevun is flavored with cumin and fennel.
