= Pol Pani =

- Type: Pancake
- Place of origin: Sri Lanka
- Main ingredients: Coconut milk

Pol Pani is a Sri Lankan food filling made with coconut scrap. They are used to make various types of Sri Lankan sweets as Pancakes, Laveriya and Halapa.

== See also ==
- List of dishes made with coconut milk
