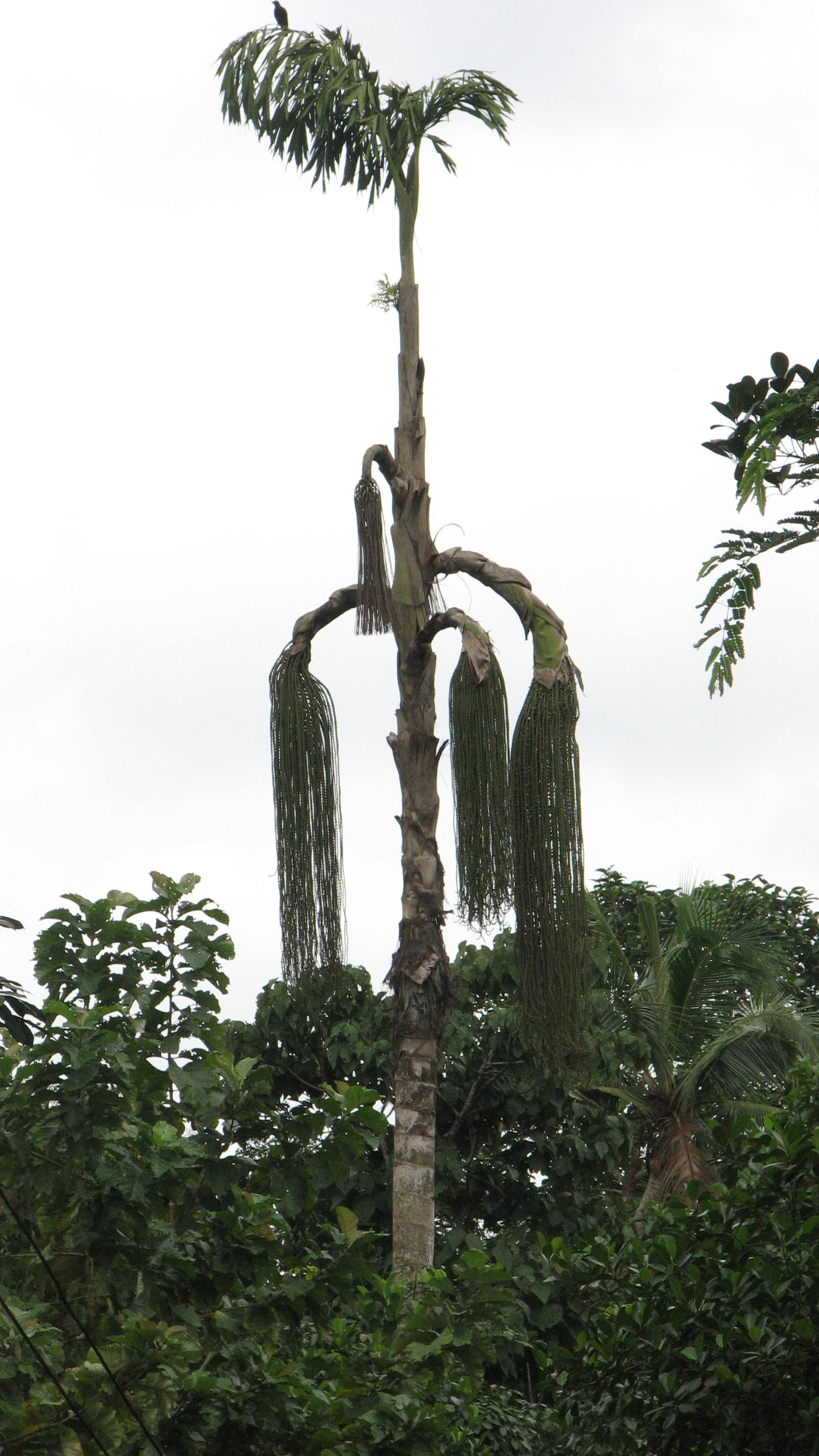

Conservation status
- Least Concern (IUCN 3.1)

Scientific classification
- Kingdom: Plantae
- Clade: Tracheophytes
- Clade: Angiosperms
- Clade: Monocots
- Clade: Commelinids
- Order: Arecales
- Family: Arecaceae
- Genus: Caryota
- Species: C. urens

Binomial name
- Caryota urens L.

= Caryota urens =

Species of flowering plant

Caryota urens is a species of flowering plant in the palm family, native to Sri Lanka, Myanmar, Malaysia (perhaps elsewhere in Indo-Malayan region) and India, where they grow in fields and rainforest clearings, it is regarded as introduced in Cambodia. The epithet urens is Latin for "stinging" alluding to the chemicals in the fruit. Common names in English include solitary fishtail palm, kithul palm, toddy palm, wine palm, sago palm and jaggery palm. Its leaf is used as fishing rod after trimming the branches of the leaf and drying. According to Monier-Williams, it is called moha-karin ("delusion maker") in Sanskrit. It is one of the sugar palms.

== Description ==
Caryota urens species is a solitary-trunked tree that can measure 18 metres (59 feet) in height and up to 30 centimetres (12 inches) wide. Widely spaced leaf-scar rings cover its gray trunk which culminate in a 6 m (20 ft) wide, 6 m tall leaf crown. The bipinnate leaves are triangular in shape, bright to deep green, 3.5 m (11 ft) long, and held on 60 cm (24 in) long petioles. The obdeltoid pinnae are 30 cm long with a pointed edge and a jagged edge.

The 3 m (10 ft) long inflorescences emerge at each leaf node, from top to bottom, producing pendent clusters of white, unisexual flowers. The fruit matures to a round, 1 cm (3/8 in) drupe, red in color with one or two hemisphere shaped seed. Like all Caryotas, the fruit contains oxalic acid, a skin and membrane irritant. As these plants are monocarpic, the completion of the flower and fruiting process results in the death of the tree.

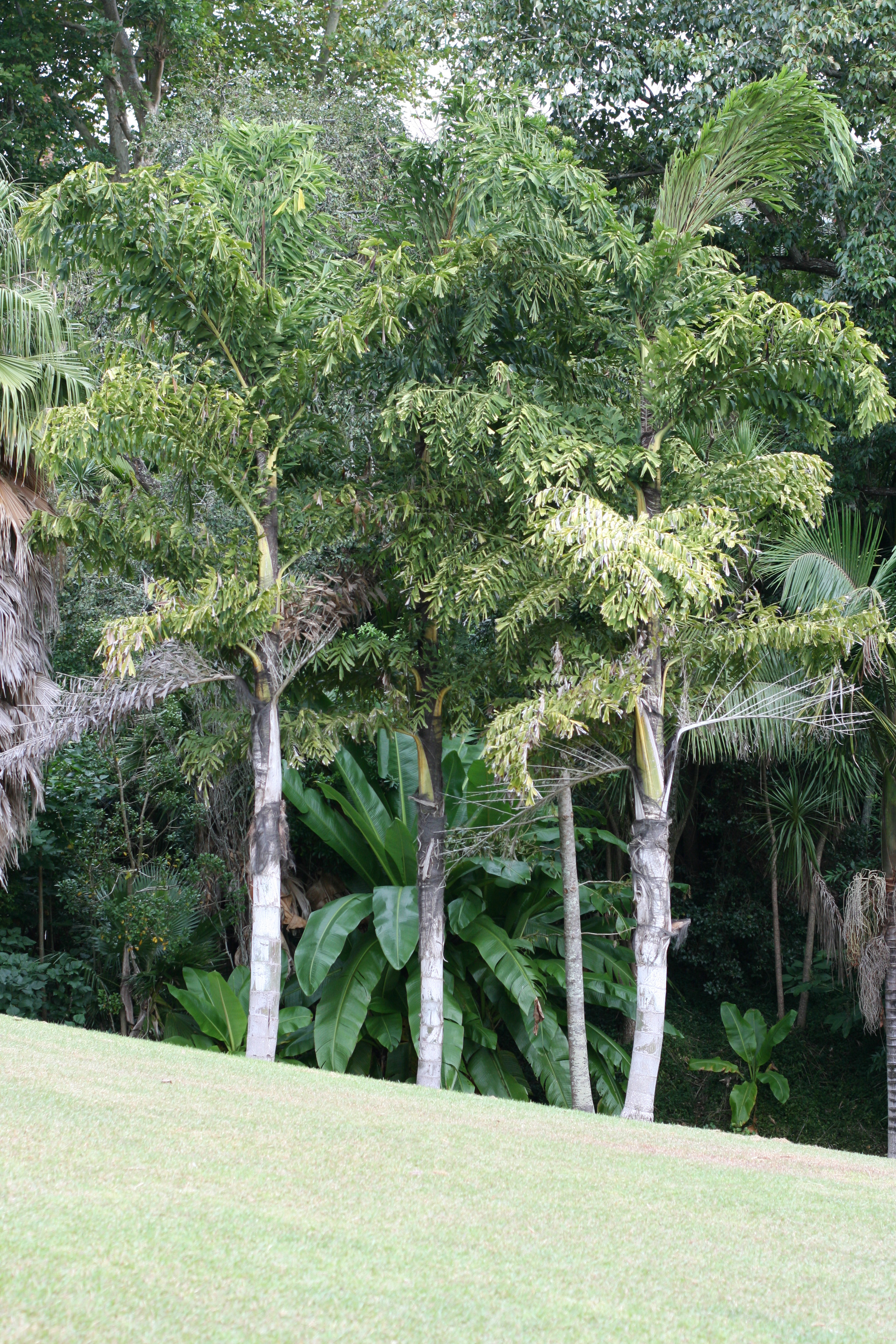
Trees

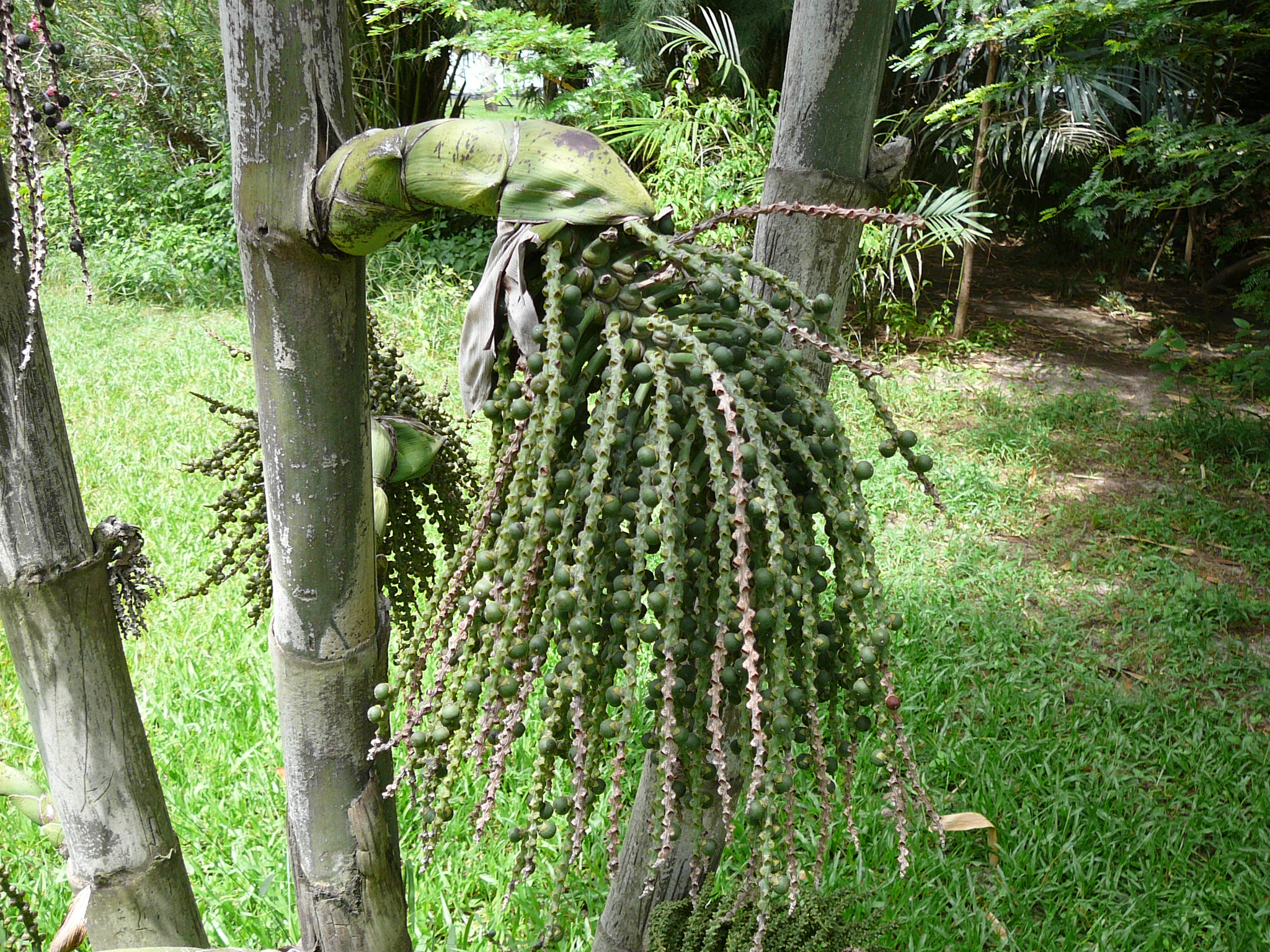
Unripe fruit

== Uses ==
The trunk contains a high quantity of starch and a juice can be extracted from the shoots of the flowers. The latter can be boiled into a sugary syrup. The cabbage can be eaten raw or cooked.

This species is called kithul (කිතුල්) in Sri Lanka. It is best known as the source of kithul treacle, a liquid jaggery. The sap of the tree is boiled for many hours until it turns into the thick, dark treacle, unique to Sri Lanka. Kithul treacle is used as a sweetener in both Sri Lankan and Western cooking.

Toddy is extracted from the inflorescence, and is considered somewhat powerful compared to toddy extracted from other palm trees. In many parts of western India this toddy is fermented and distilled to make a traditional alcohol called as 'Maadi'

The pulp of the mature plant is cut, sun dried, and powdered, and is edible. It is sweet in taste. This powder is considered cool and nutritious in Coastal districts of Karnataka. In Sri Lanka, the powder is mixed with coconut milk and cooked to make Kithul Thalapa (කිතුල් තලප).

Elephants are fed both the leaf and the pulp of this plant.

The leaves possess strong fibres and are used for basketry in Cambodia, where the plant is named tunsaè. The heart of the trunk contains a starch similar to sago, as well the trunk can be used for building. The fruit, when its stiff hairs are removed, is pleasant and sweet to eat, and, as elsewhere, the Cambodians cut the stalks to make sugar, which in turn can be made into wine.

== Cultivation ==
Caryota urens is cultivated as an ornamental tree, and planted in gardens and parks in tropical and sub-tropical climates. It is also used as an interior and houseplant when smaller.

== Cultural significance ==
On 11 December 2025, the Sri Lankan kithul tapping industry was officially inscribed on UNESCO's Representative List of the Intangible Cultural Heritage of Humanity.
