= Jaggery =

Unrefined cane sugar

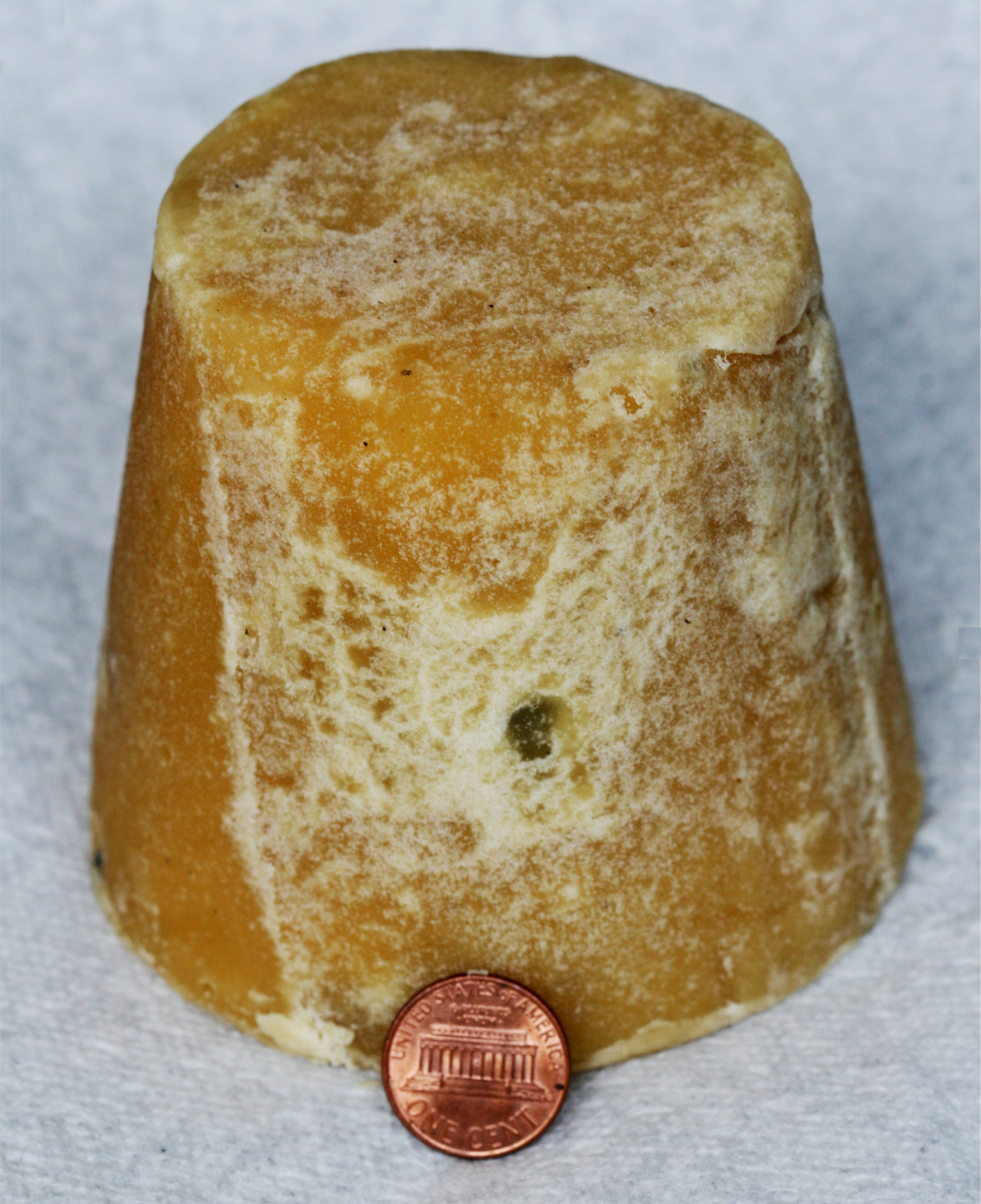
- A block of jaggery with a US penny for size comparison
- Main ingredients: Sugarcane juice, boiled and concentrated.
- Similar dishes: Muscovado, panela, palm sugar

Jaggery is a traditional non-centrifugal cane sugar consumed in South Asia, Southeast Asia, North America, Central America, Brazil and Africa. It is a concentrated product of cane juice and often date or palm sap without separation of the molasses and crystals, and can vary from golden brown to dark brown in colour. It contains up to 50% sucrose, up to 20% invert sugars, and up to 20% moisture, with the remainder made up of other insoluble matter, such as wood ash, proteins, and bagasse fibres. Jaggery is very similar to muscovado, an important sweetener in Portuguese, British and French cuisine.

== Etymology ==
Jaggery comes from Portuguese terms jágara, jagra, borrowed from Tamil சக்கரை (cakkarai) or Malayalam ശർക്കര (cakkara), which is borrowed from Sanskrit शर्करा (śarkarā). It is a doublet of sugar.

== Origins and production ==
Non-centrifugal cane sugar (jaggery) production near Inle Lake (Myanmar). Crushing and boiling stage.

The process of making granular jaggery

Jaggery is made from the products of sugarcane and the toddy palm tree. The sugar made from the sap of the date palm is more prized and less commonly available outside of the regions where it is made. The toddy palm is tapped for producing jaggery in India, Bangladesh, Pakistan, Nepal, Myanmar and Sri Lanka.

In Sri Lanka, syrup extracts from kithul (Caryota urens) trees are widely used for jaggery production.

All types of the sugar come in blocks or pastes of solidified concentrated sugar syrup heated to 200 °C (392 °F). Traditionally, the syrup is made by boiling raw sugarcane juice or palm sap in large, shallow, round-bottomed vessels.

=== Preparation ===
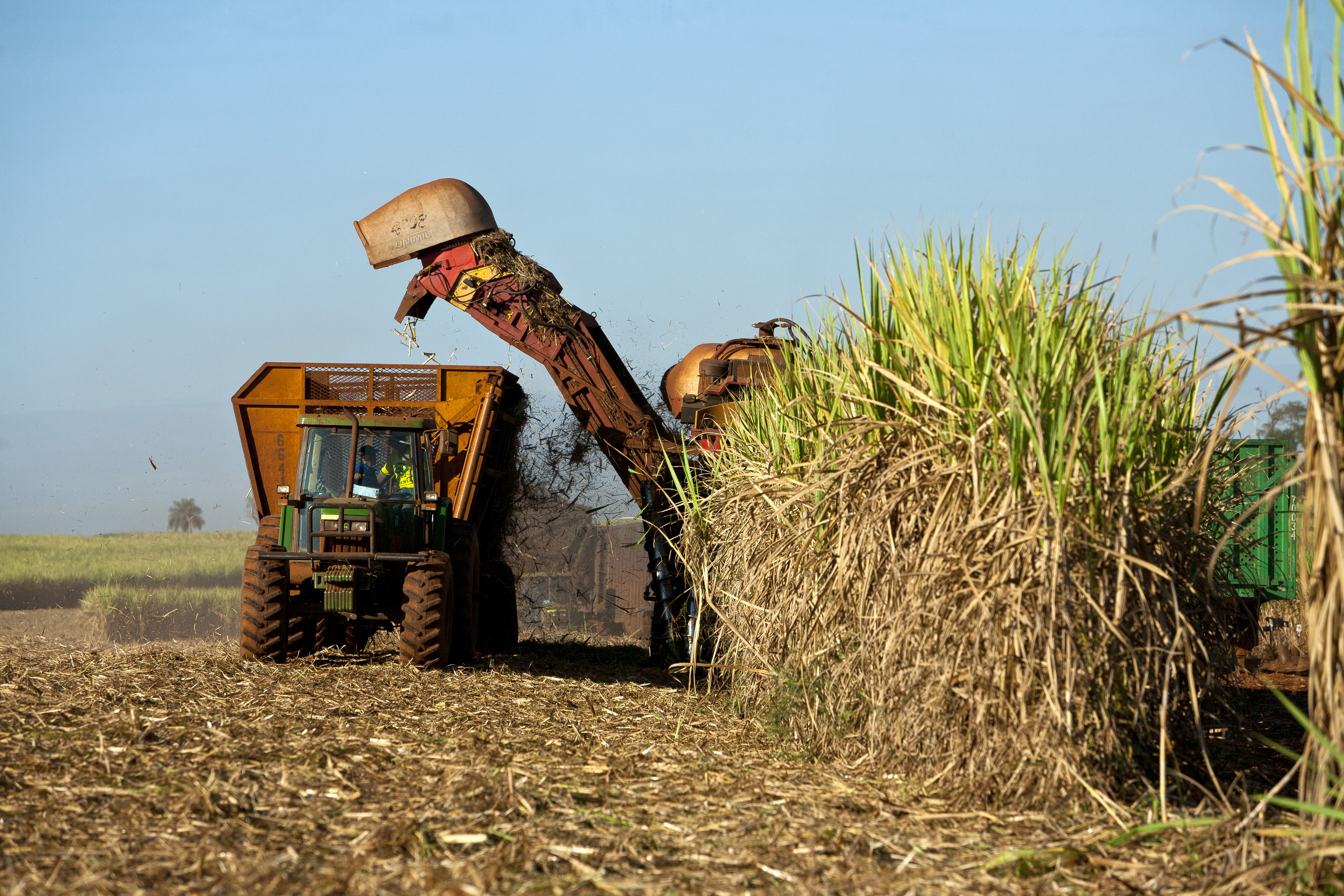
Harvesting sugar cane without pre-burn. The abundant waste on the ground will be irrigated to release nutrients for the next crop.

Historically, the sugarcane cultivators used crushers that were powered by oxen, but all modern crushers are power-driven. These crushers are placed in fields near the sugarcane plants. The cut and cleaned sugarcane is crushed and the extracted cane juice is collected in a large vessel. A quantity of the juice is transferred to a smaller vessel for heating in a furnace.

The vessel is heated for about an hour. Dried wood pulp from the crushed sugarcane is traditionally used as fuel for the furnace. While boiling the juice, lime is added to it so that all the wood particles rise to the top of the juice in a froth, which is skimmed off. Finally, the juice is thickened. The resulting thick liquid is about one-third of the original volume.

This hot liquid is golden in colour. It is stirred continuously and lifted with a spatula to observe whether it forms a thread or drips while falling. If it forms many threads, it has completely thickened. It is poured into a shallow flat-bottomed pan to cool and solidify. The pan is extremely large to allow only a thin coat of this hot liquid to form at its bottom, so as to increase the surface area for quick evaporation and cooling. After cooling, the jaggery becomes a soft solid that is then molded into the desired shape.

The quality of jaggery is judged by its colour; dark brown means it was not clarified during the making, or the sugarcane juice was boiled with full nutrients intact. Some people misinterpret this as impure and clarify the juice to improve colour while taking out the nutrients to make golden-yellow jaggery, which is nothing but refined sugar. Due to this grading scale, coloured adulterants, which may be toxic, are sometimes added to jaggery to simulate the golden hue.

Natural dark brown jaggery is derived from whole sugarcane juice, by means of boiling at nearly 200 °C in a large cast iron pan. Food-grade mustard or castor oil (having a high smoke point) is usually used in such pans in negligible quantity – approximately 2 tsp (10 mL) per 100 kg – so that the very hot juice froth does not come out of the pan during boiling. Mustard or castor oil is present in whole jaggery in traces, and the qualities of such oils (laxative) coincide and support this quality of whole jaggery.

== Uses ==
=== South Asia ===
Jaggery is used as an ingredient in sweet and savoury dishes in the cuisines of India, Pakistan, Bangladesh, Nepal, Sri Lanka, Afghanistan and Iran. For example, a pinch of it is sometimes added to sambar, rasam and other common dishes in Udupi cuisine. Jaggery is added to lentil soups (dāl) to add sweetness to balance the spicy, salty, and sour components, particularly in Gujarati cuisine.

In Sri Lanka, jaggery is usually made using the syrup of the kithul palm tree, or from coconut syrup. The respective names in Sinhalese are kitul hakuru (කිතුල් හකුරු) and pol hakuru (පොල් හකුරු). Jaggery from the syrup of the palmyrah palm is more prominent in the northern part of the country; this is referred to as palmyrah jaggery, or panangkaruppatti (பனங்கருப்பட்டி) in Tamil. Jaggery made from sugarcane syrup is considered inferior to palm syrup-based jaggery varieties, and the term jaggery (கருப்பட்டி) is generally understood in the country to refer to the latter.

Maharashtra in India is the largest producer and consumer of jaggery known as "gul" (गुळ) in Marathi and Marwadi, "gur" (گڑ) in Urdu, "bellaṁ" (బెల్లం) in Telugu, bella (ಬೆಲ್ಲ) in Kannada, "vellam"(வெல்லம்) or "Sarkarai" (சர்க்கரை) in Tamil, "sharkara" (ശർക്കര) in Malayalam , "gōḷa" (ગોળ) in Gujarati , "miṣṭa" (मिष्ट) in Sanskrit, "guṛa" (ଗୁଡ଼) in Odia, gur (गुड़) in Hindi and "guṛ" (গুড়) in Bengali.

Kolhapur is one of the largest producers of jaggery in India and has a GI Tag for Kolhapur jaggery. Most vegetable dishes, curries, and dals, and many desserts, contain it. Jaggery is especially used during Makar Sankranti for making a dessert called tilgul. In Gujarat, a similar preparation known called tal na ladu or tal sankli is made. In rural Maharashtra and Karnataka, water and a piece of jaggery are given to a person arriving home from working under the hot sun. In Andhra, Telangana and Karnataka, on Ugadi festival day (New Year), Ugadi pachadi is made from jaggery and five other ingredients (shad ruchulu- sweet, sour, salt, tangy, spice and bitter) and is consumed symbolizing life is a mixture of happiness, disgust, fear, surprise, anger and sadness.

Molasses (काकवी), a byproduct of the production of jaggery, is used in rural Maharashtra and Karnataka as a sweetener. It contains many minerals not found in ordinary sugar and is considered beneficial to health in traditional Ayurvedic medicine. It is an ingredient of many sweet delicacies, such as gur ke chawal/chol ("jaggery rice"), a traditional Rajasthani or Punjabi dish.

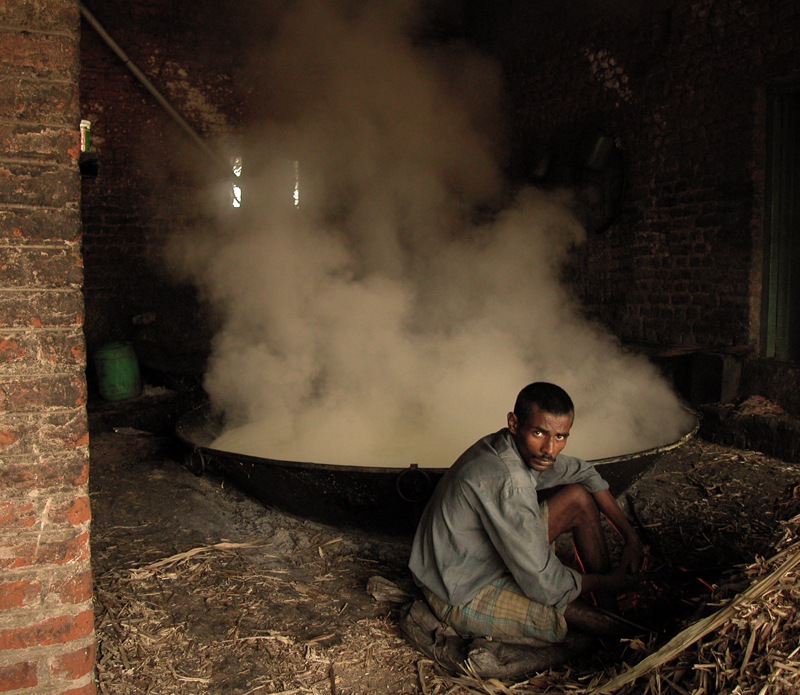
Jaggery preparation by heating juice in the vessel on furnace

In Gujarat, laddus are made from wheat flour and jaggery. A well-known Maharashtrian recipe, puran poli, uses it as a sweetener apart from sugar. Jaggery is considered an easily available sweet which is shared on any good occasion. In engagement ceremonies, small particles of it are mixed with coriander seeds (ધાણા). Hence, in many Gujarati communities, engagement is commonly known by the metonym gol-dhana (ગોળ-ધાણા), literally "jaggery and coriander seeds".

Jaggery is used extensively in South India to balance the pungency of spicy foods. In Andhra Pradesh and Tamil Nadu it is used for sweets such as chakkara pongal and milk pongal, which are prepared with rice, milk, and jaggery. During Sankranti, ariselu, an authentic Andhra Pradesh dish, is prepared. In Tamil Nadu, ellurundai (sesame balls), adhirasam and pori vilangu urundai (puffed rice balls) are prepared as an offering, called prasadam, to god during Puja and festivals such as Diwali, Tamil New Year and Janmashtami.

A sweet liquid called paanakam, made of water, jaggery and peppercorns, is prepared as the favorite offering to Lord Rama during Rama Navami festival. In Kerala, it is considered auspicious and is widely used in cooking. It is a vital ingredient in many varieties of payasam, a sweet dish. The state of Kerala as 2 GI tagged jaggeries by the name of Central Travancore jaggery and Marayoor jaggery

In Tamil Nadu, jaggery is used exclusively as a sweetener. It is used in a dish called chakkarai pongal. It is prepared during the festival of Pongal (Thai Pongal), which is held when the harvesting season begins. It is used to make kali, to sweeten fruit salads and payasam that are offered to the gods. Jaggery is used in religious rituals. In rural areas, cane jaggery and palm jaggery are used to sweeten beverages, whereas refined sugar has replaced it in urban areas.

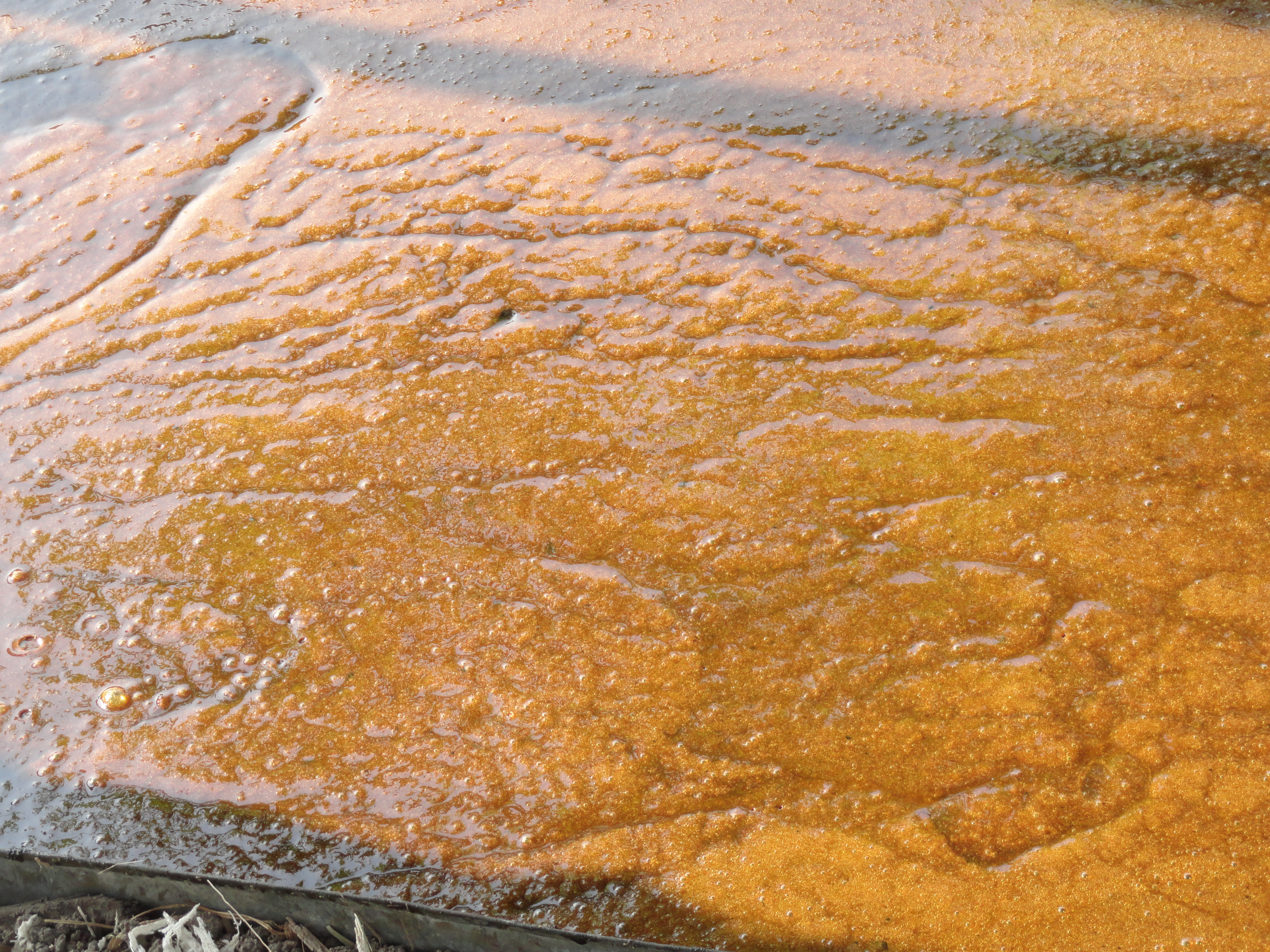
Semisolid sugarcane juice drying in another pan for preparation of jaggery

In Odia cuisine, cakes, or piṭhas, contain jaggery. Pithas like Arisa pitha are made out of jaggery called guda in Odia. Kakara pitha contains coconut filings which are caramelized using jaggery. Guda is also added to rice flakes known as chuda and eaten for breakfast. Some marmalade made of mango and dillenia contain the ingredient.

In Bengali cuisine, it is commonly used in making sweet dishes, some of which mix jaggery with milk and coconut. Popular sweet dishes such as laḍḍu/laṛu or paṭishapta piṭha mix it with coconut shreds. Jaggery is molded into novel shapes as a type of candy. The same preparation of sweets have been made in the neighbouring state of Assam. Some of the popular sweet dishes of Assam such as til-pitha (made of rice powder, sesame and jaggery), other rice-based pitha, and payas are made of jaggery. In some villages of Assam, people drink salty red tea with a cube of gurd (jaggery), which is popularly called cheleka-chah (licking tea).

Traditional Karnataka sweets, such as paayasa, obbattu (holige) and unday use different kinds of jaggery. A pinch is commonly added to sambar (also known as huli saaru) and rasam (also known as saaru). Karnataka produces sugar and palm-based jaggery.

Muzaffarnagar in Uttar Pradesh has the largest jaggery market in the world along with having a GI Tag for Muzaffarnagar jaggery, followed by Anakapalle in the Visakhapatnam District in Andhra Pradesh. The Kolhapur District in western Maharashtra is famous for its jaggery, which is yellow and much sought after in Maharashtra and Gujarat. Mandya in Karnataka is known for its jaggery production.

=== Southeast Asia ===
In Myanmar, jaggery, called htanyet (ထန်းလျက်) in Burmese, is harvested from toddy palm syrup. In central Myanmar and around Bagan (Pagan), toddy syrup is collected solely for making jaggery. The translucent white syrup is boiled until it becomes golden brown and then made into bite-size pieces. It is considered a sweet and is eaten by children and adults alike, usually in the afternoon with a pot of green tea. It has been referred to locally as Burmese chocolate. Toddy palm jaggery is sometimes mixed with coconut shreds, jujube puree or sesame, depending on the area. This type of jaggery is used in Burmese cooking, usually to add colour and enrich the food.

=== Other uses ===
Other uses include jaggery toffees and jaggery cake made with pumpkin preserve, cashew nuts, peanuts and spices. Jaggery may be used in the creation of alcoholic beverages such as palm wine.

Besides being a food, jaggery may be used (mixed in an emulsion with buttermilk and mustard oil) to season the inside of tandoor ovens.

Jaggery is used in natural dyeing of fabric. It is also used in hookahs in rural areas of Pakistan and India.

== Nutrition ==
In a reference amount of 100 g (3.5 oz), jaggery from palm syrup contains 2.5 mg of zinc, 11.4 mg of iron, and 1050 mg of potassium.

== Nomenclature ==
=== In South Asia ===
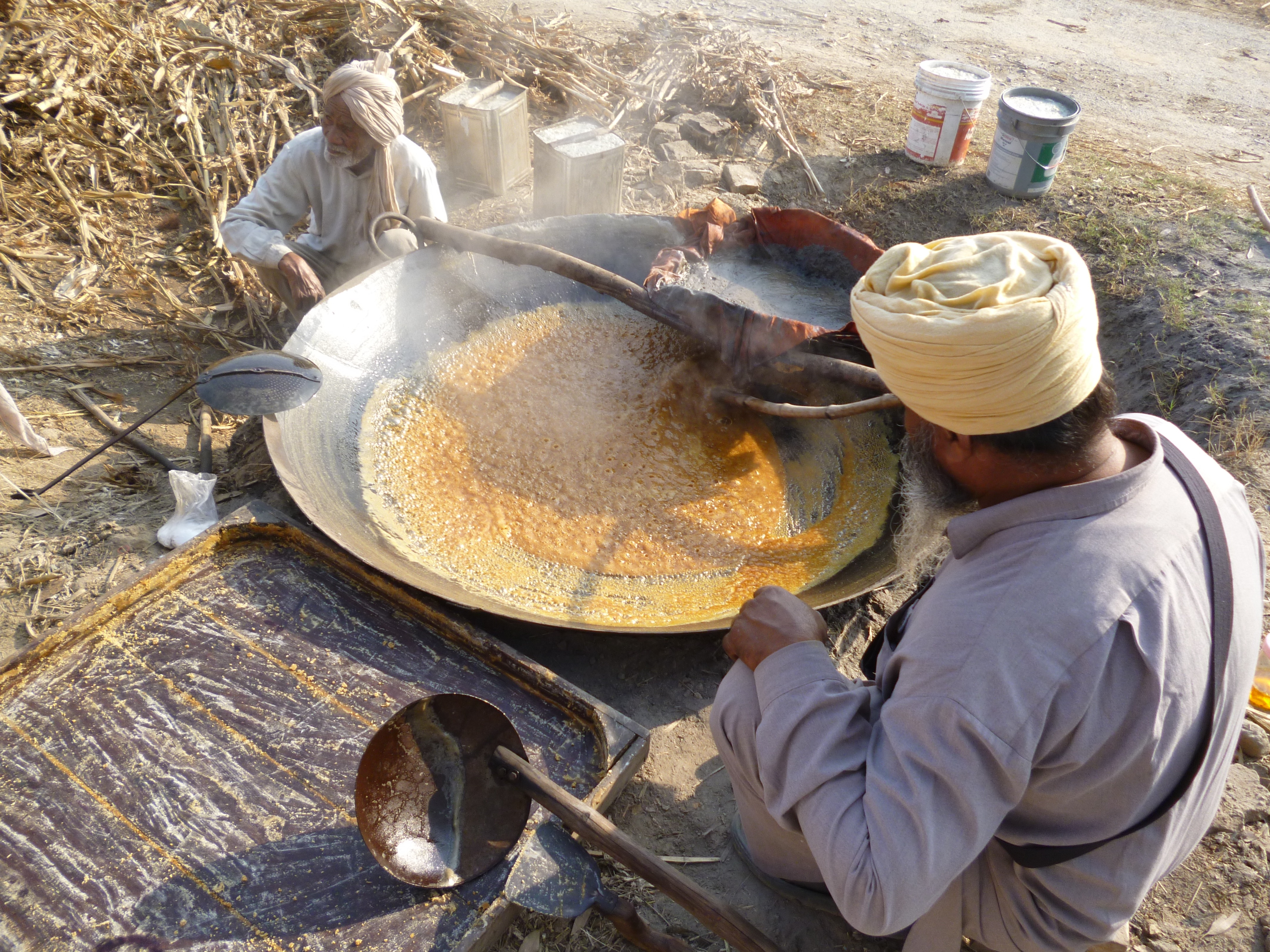
Making jaggery (gur) in Punjab

- From guḍa in Sanskrit (गुड, 'ball'):
  - ɡuɖ in Nepali (गुड)
  - guṛ in Bengali (গুড়), Bhojpuri (गुड़), Punjabi (ਗੁੜ), Haryanvi (गुड़), Hindi (गुड़)
  - gur in Assamese (গুৰ) and Nagamese (গুৰ)
  - ɠuṛ in Sindhi (ڳُڙ) and Urdu (گڑ)
  - guṛô (ଗୁଡ଼) in Odia
  - goḍ (Romanized godd) in Konkani (गोड)
  - guḷ (गूळ) in Marathi
  - gôḷ in Gujarati (ગોળ) and Rajasthani (गुळ)
  - gwëṛa in Pashto (ګوړه)
- From Proto-Dravidian *vell-am:
  - vellam in Tamil (வெல்லம்) and Malayalam (വെല്ലം), or longer form panai vellam in Tamil (பனை வெல்லம்)
  - bellam in Telugu (బెల్లం)
  - bella in Kannada (ಬೆಲ್ಲ) and Tulu
- From Sanskrit śarkarā (शर्करा, 'gravel, grit, candied sugar'):
  - śarkkara or cakkara in Malayalam (ശർക്കര or ചക്കര)
  - sakkarai in Tamil (சக்கரை)
  - sakkhar in Nepali (सक्खर)
  - hakuru in Sinhala (හකුරු) and Dhivehi (ހަކުރު)
- From Sanskrit miṣṭa (मिष्ट, 'sweet, tasty'):
  - mitha in Bhojpuri
  - mithoi in Assamese (মিঠৈ)
- Other terms:
  - kawltu tuikang in Paite
  - kurtai in Mizo
  - bheli in Nepali (भेली)
  - karuppaṭṭi, karippaṭṭi, or karipeṭṭi in Malayalam (കരിപെട്ടി) is jaggery made from palm juice, and panam kalkaṇḍam (പനം കല്കണ്ടം) is rock candy made from palm juice.
  - karupaṭṭi (கருப்பட்டி) or panam kalkaṇḍu (பனம் கற்கண்டு) in Tamil

=== In Southeast Asia ===
==== Cambodia ====
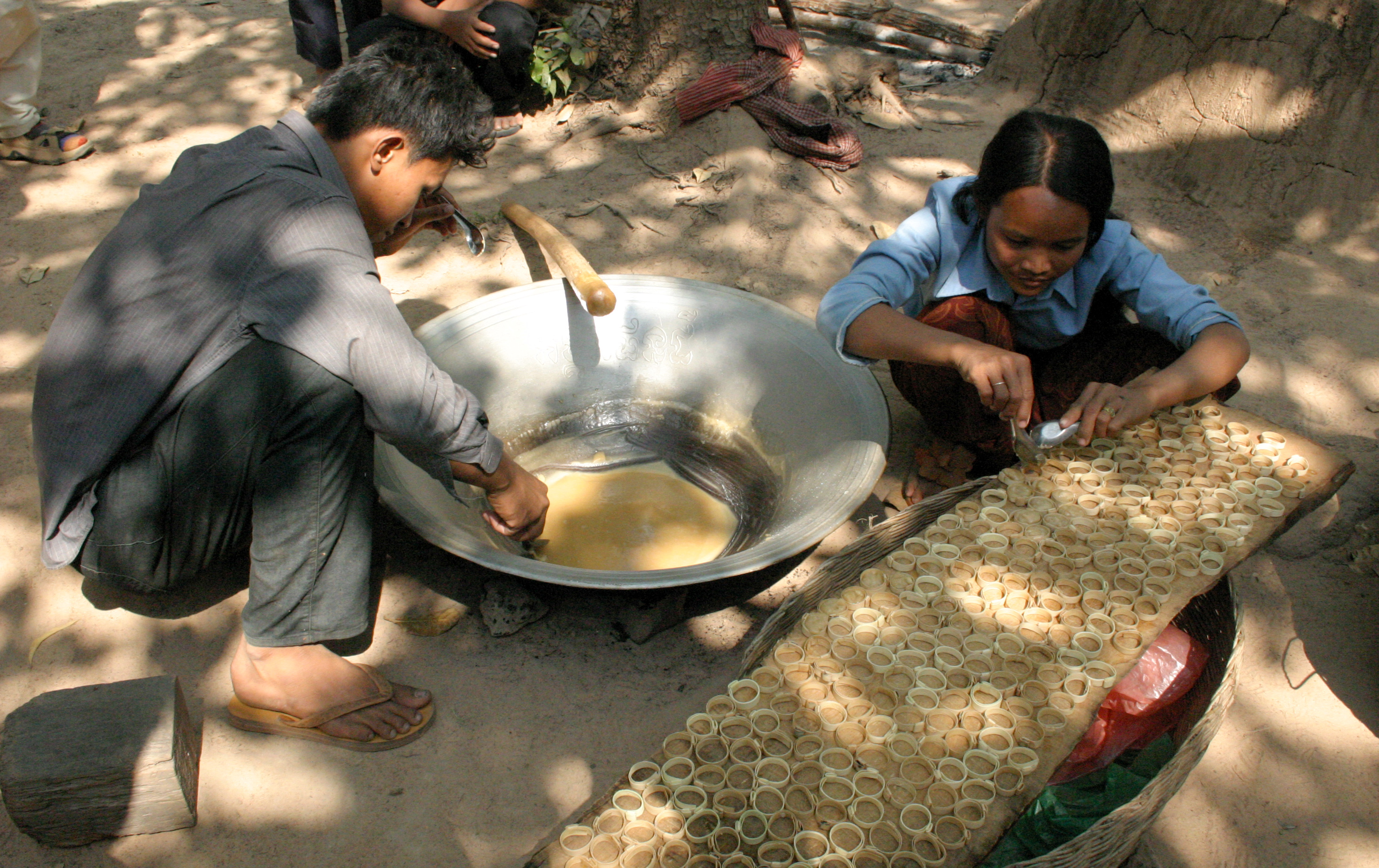
The production of palm jaggery in Cambodia

- Skor tnaot (ស្ករត្នោត) in Khmer

==== Myanmar (Burma) ====
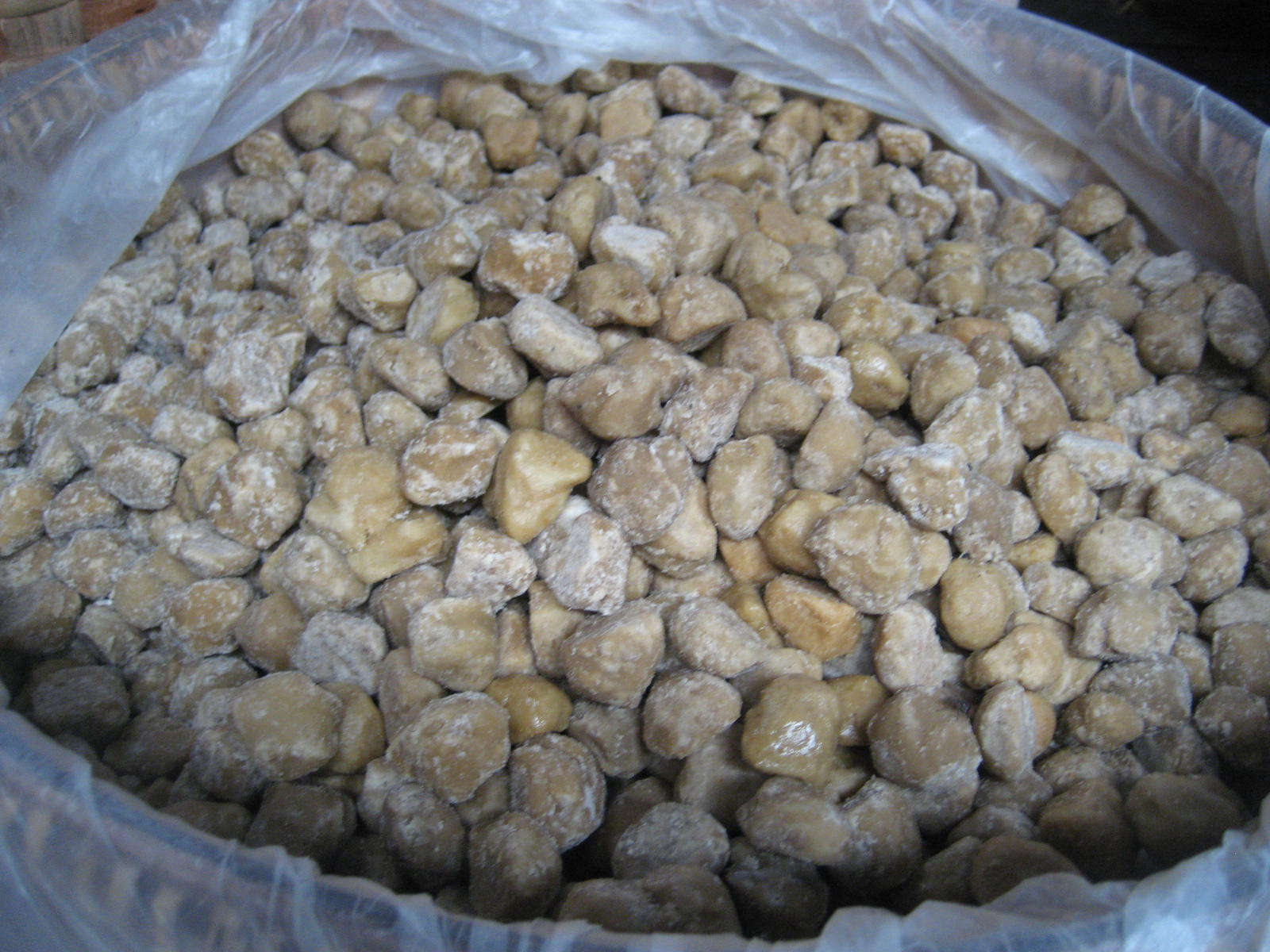
Burmese jaggery at a market in Mandalay

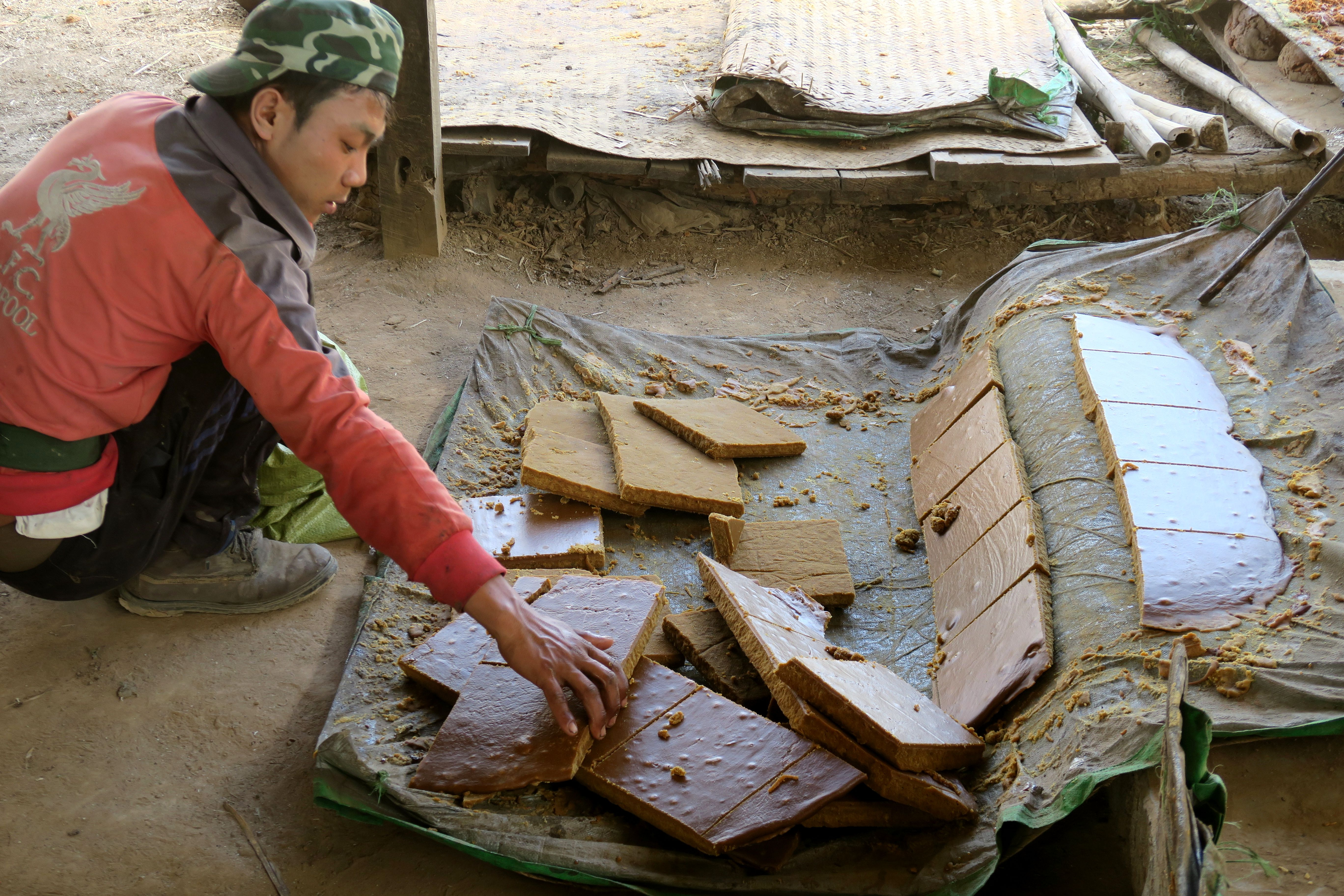
Sugarcane jaggery in Myanmar

- Htanyet (ထန်းလျက်) [Toddy Palm Jaggery] (pronounced [tʰəɲeʔ]) in Burmese
- Kyan Tha Kar (ကြံသကာ) [Sugarcane Jaggery] in Burmese

==== Malaysia ====
- Gula melaka or Gula merah in Malay
- Gula nisan/nise in Kelantanese Malay
- Gula apong in Sarawak, Malaysia is a variant of the jaggery, which is made from the sap of the nipah palm or Nypa fruticans.

==== Indonesia ====
- Gula jawa in Indonesian and Javanese
- Gula merah in Indonesian and Malay
- Gula aren in Indonesian and Betawi
- Gula kawung in Sundanese

==== Philippines ====
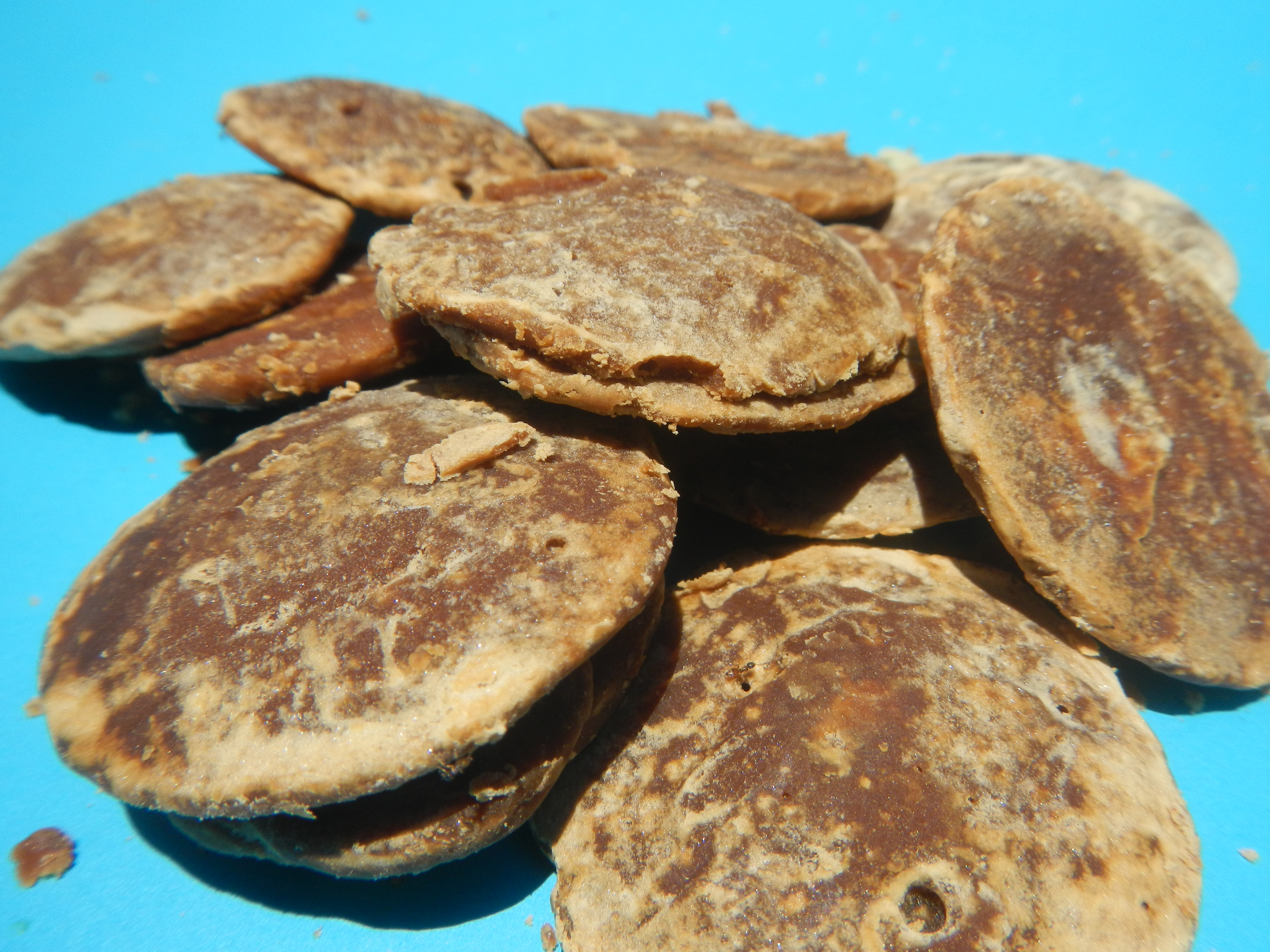
Philippine sangkaka, or panutsá, are disc-shaped as these are traditionally made in dried coconut shell halves.

- Koya-Koya (Ilocano)
- Tagapulot (Ilocano)
- Pakombuk (Kapampangan)
- Panocha (Philippine Spanish)
- Bagkat Bao - possibly regional to Bulacan (Tagalog)
- Pakaskás - Cavite (Tagalog)
- Panutsá - from the Spanish above (Tagalog)
- Sangkaka (Tagalog)
- Calamay - Leyte, Samar (Waray)

==== Thailand ====
- Palm jaggery: น้ำตาลโตนด, namtan tanot, pronounced [nám.tāːn tā.nòːt]
- Coconut jaggery: น้ำตาลมะพร้าว, namtan maphrao, pronounced [nám.tāːn mā.pʰráːw]
- Cane sugar: น้ำตาลอ้อย (งบน้ำอ้อย), namtan oi (Ngob Nam Oi), pronounced [nám.tāːn ʔɔ̂j]
- Granulated brown cane sugar: น้ำตาลทรายแดง, namtan sai daeng, pronounced [nám.tāːn sāːj dɛ̄ːŋ]
- Granulated white cane sugar: น้ำตาลทราย, namtan sai, pronounced [nám.tāːn sāːj]; or น้ำตาลทรายขาว, namtan sai khao, pronounced [nám.tāːn sāːj kʰǎːw]

==== Vietnam ====
- Đường thốt nốt in Vietnamese

=== Elsewhere ===
- Raspadura in Cuba and Panama
- Rapadura in Brazil
- Panela in Central America and parts of South America
- Piloncillo in Mexico
- Tapa de dulce in Costa Rica
- Chancaca in Peru
- Papelón, panela or miel de panela in Venezuela
- Sukari nguuru in Swahili
- Kokuto (黒糖, Kokutō) in Japanese
- 紅糖 (Hóng táng) or 黑糖 (hēi táng) in Chinese, the latter used by the Chinese community in Southeast Asia and Oceania
- Guṛ (ګړ) in Afghanistan
- Jājiriyy (جاجري) in Arabic

== Image gallery ==
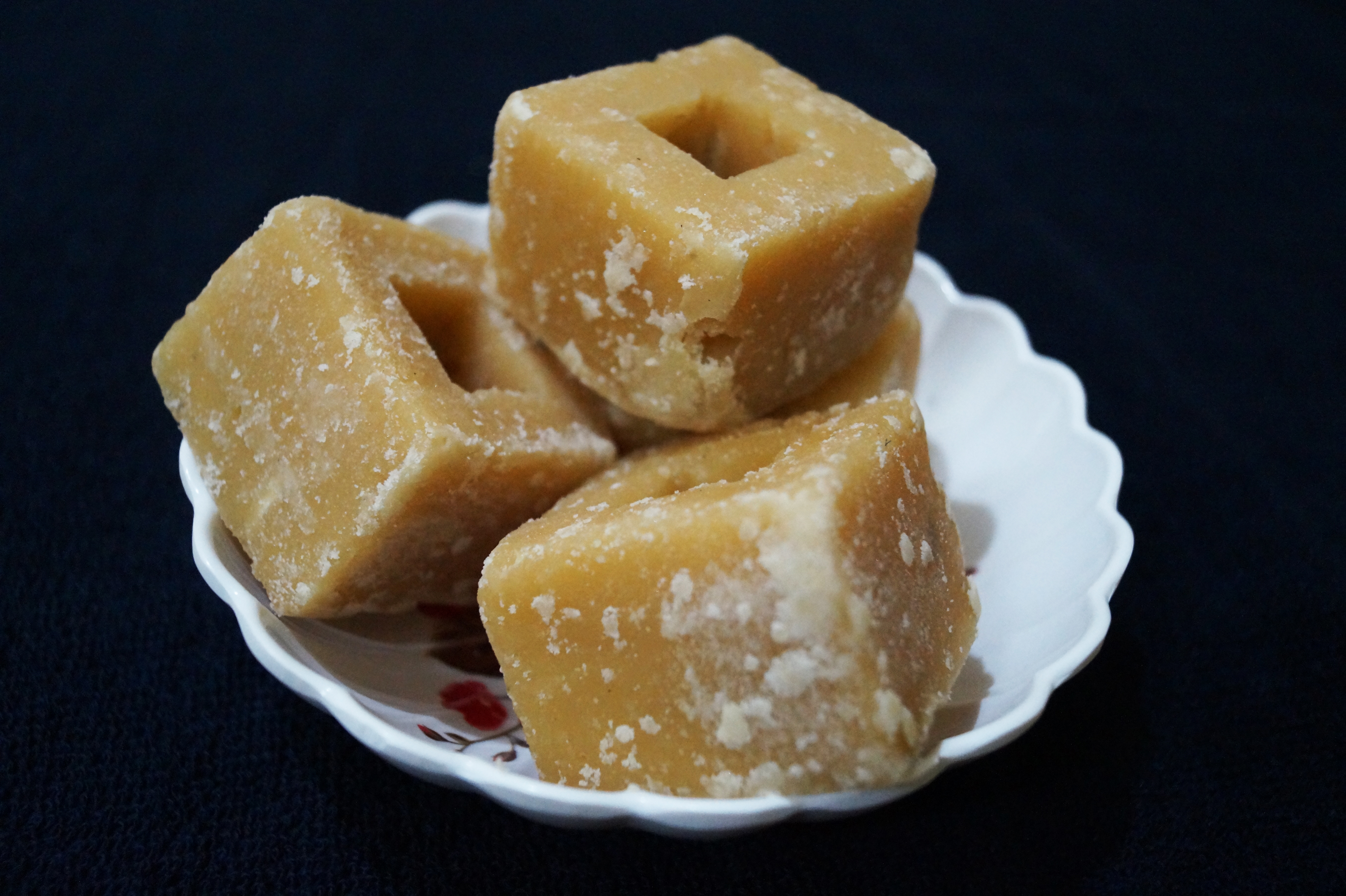
Jaggery cubes

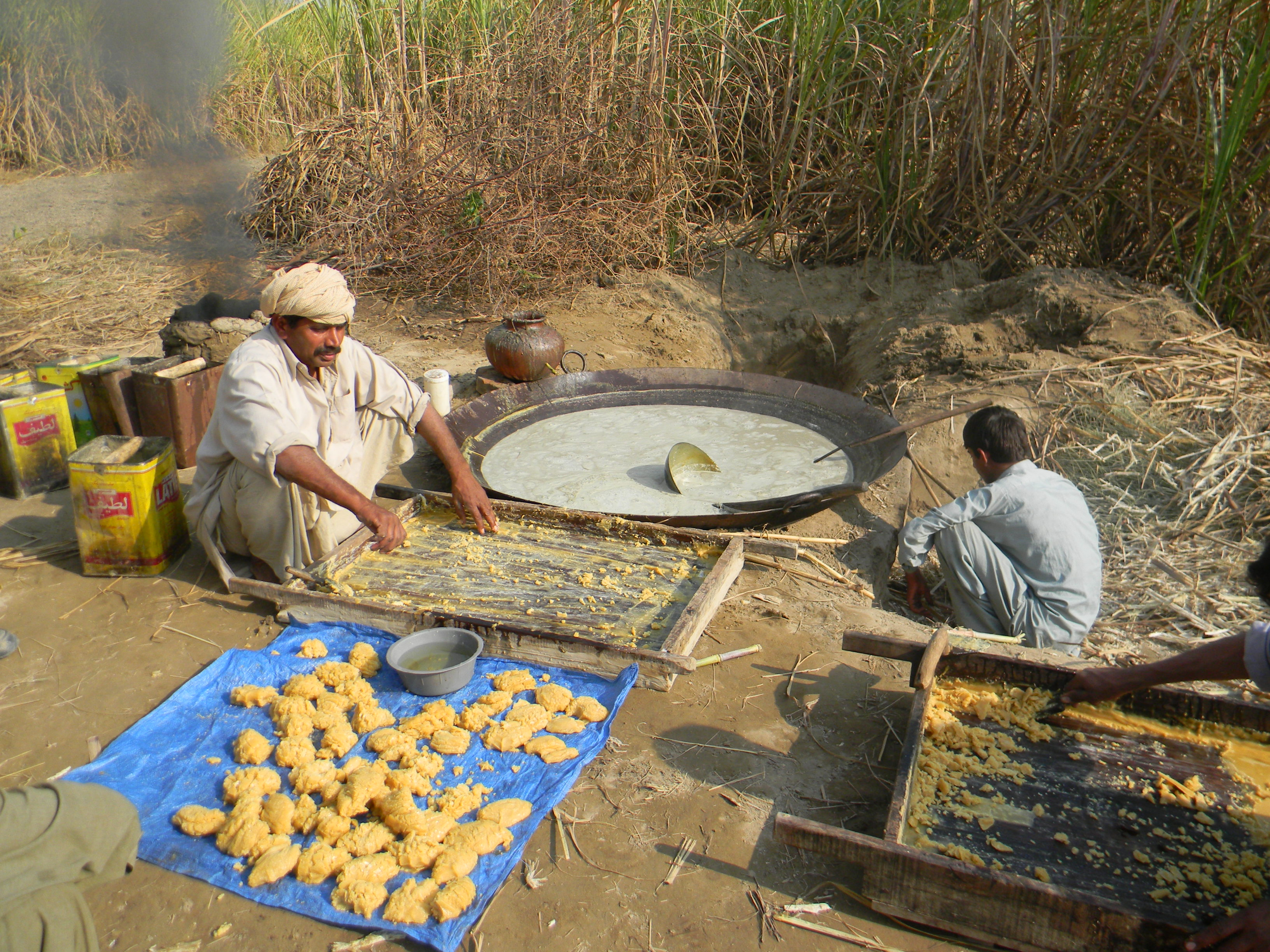
Jaggery (gur) making at small scale near sugarcane farm in Pakistan

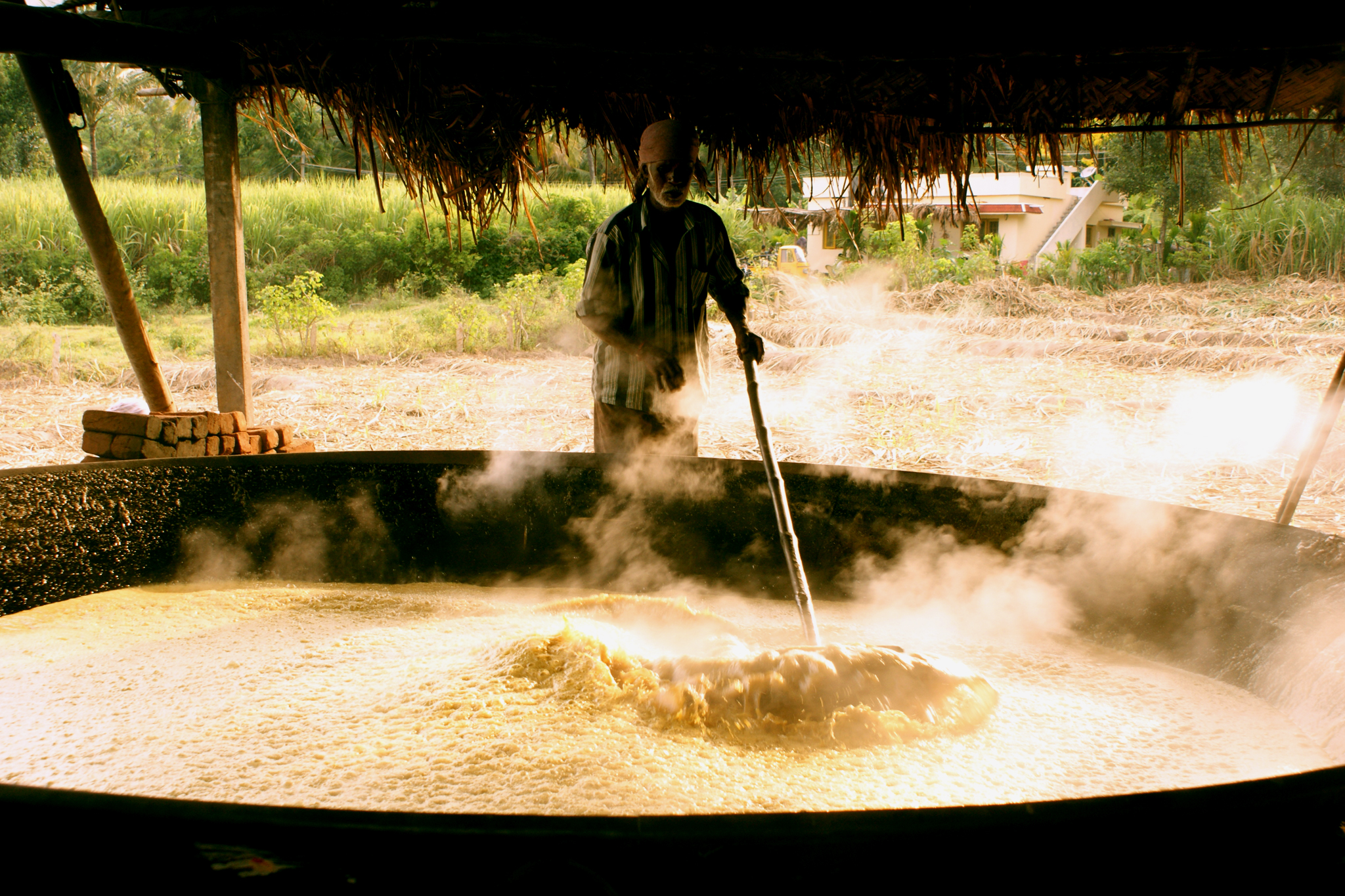
Boiling the sugarcane juice in large-scale jaggery (gur) making in India

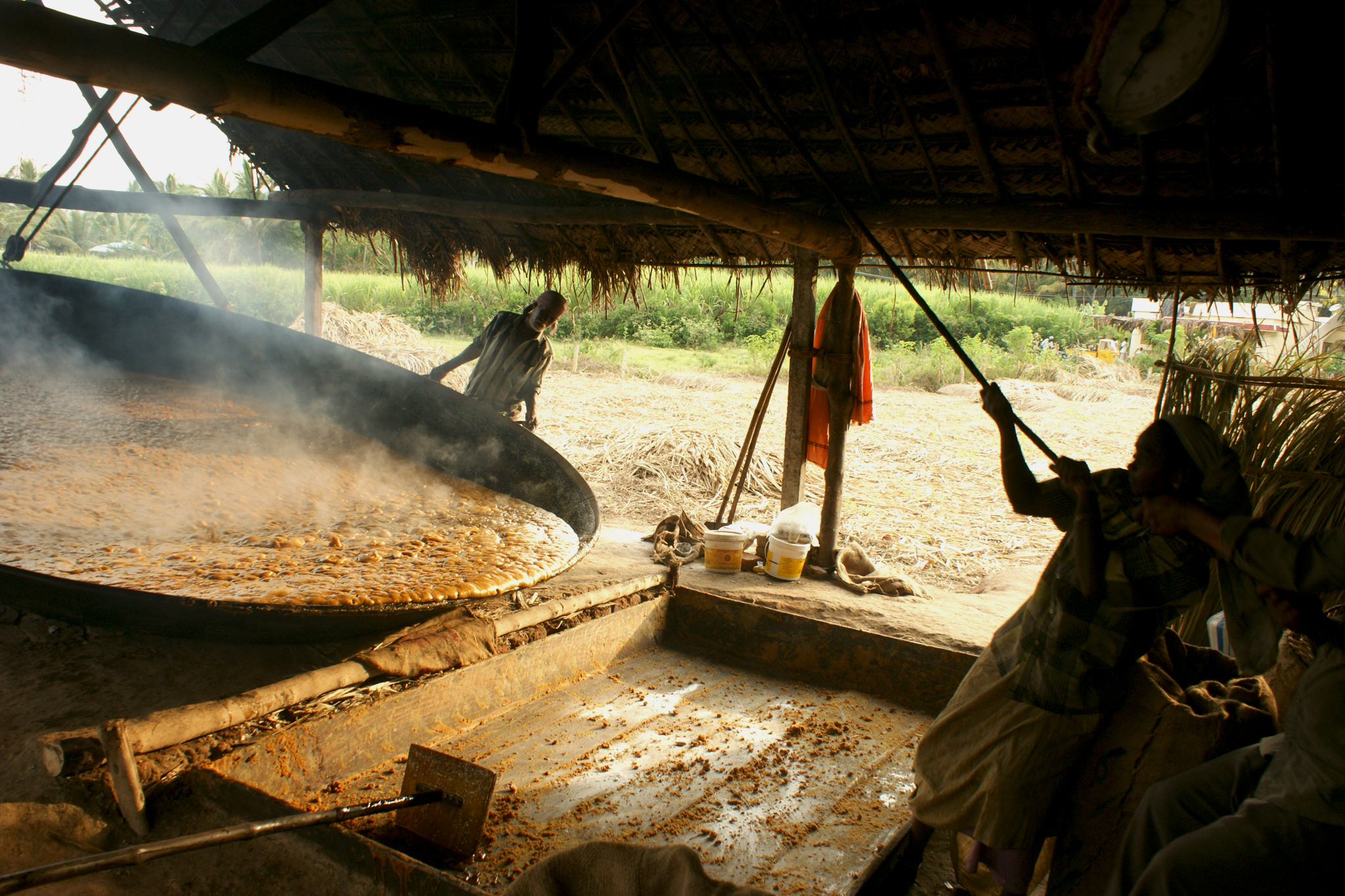
Transferring boiled sugarcane juice into vessel to dry

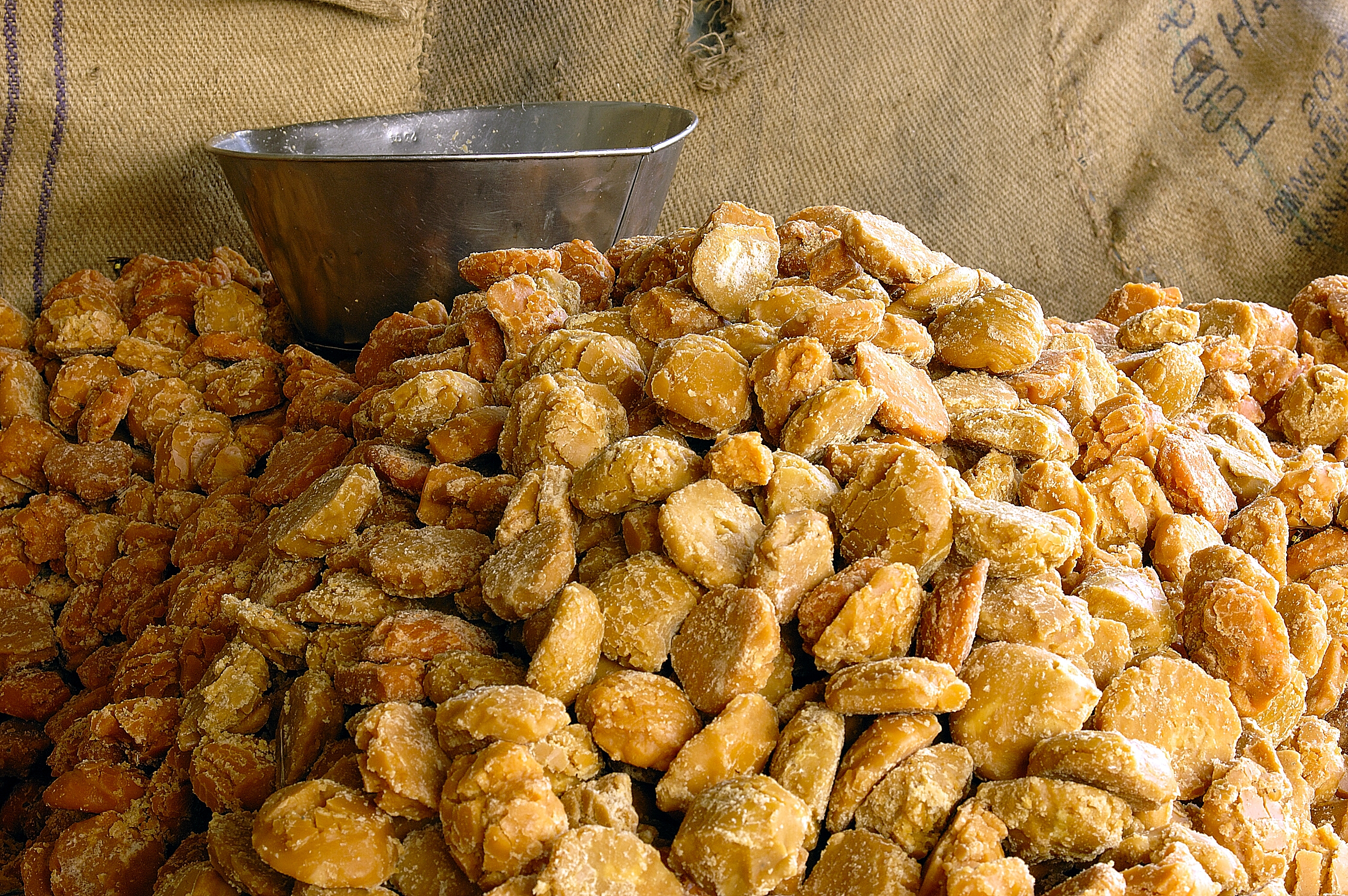
Gud, or jaggery: Sugarcane-derived raw sugar crystallised cubes or blocks

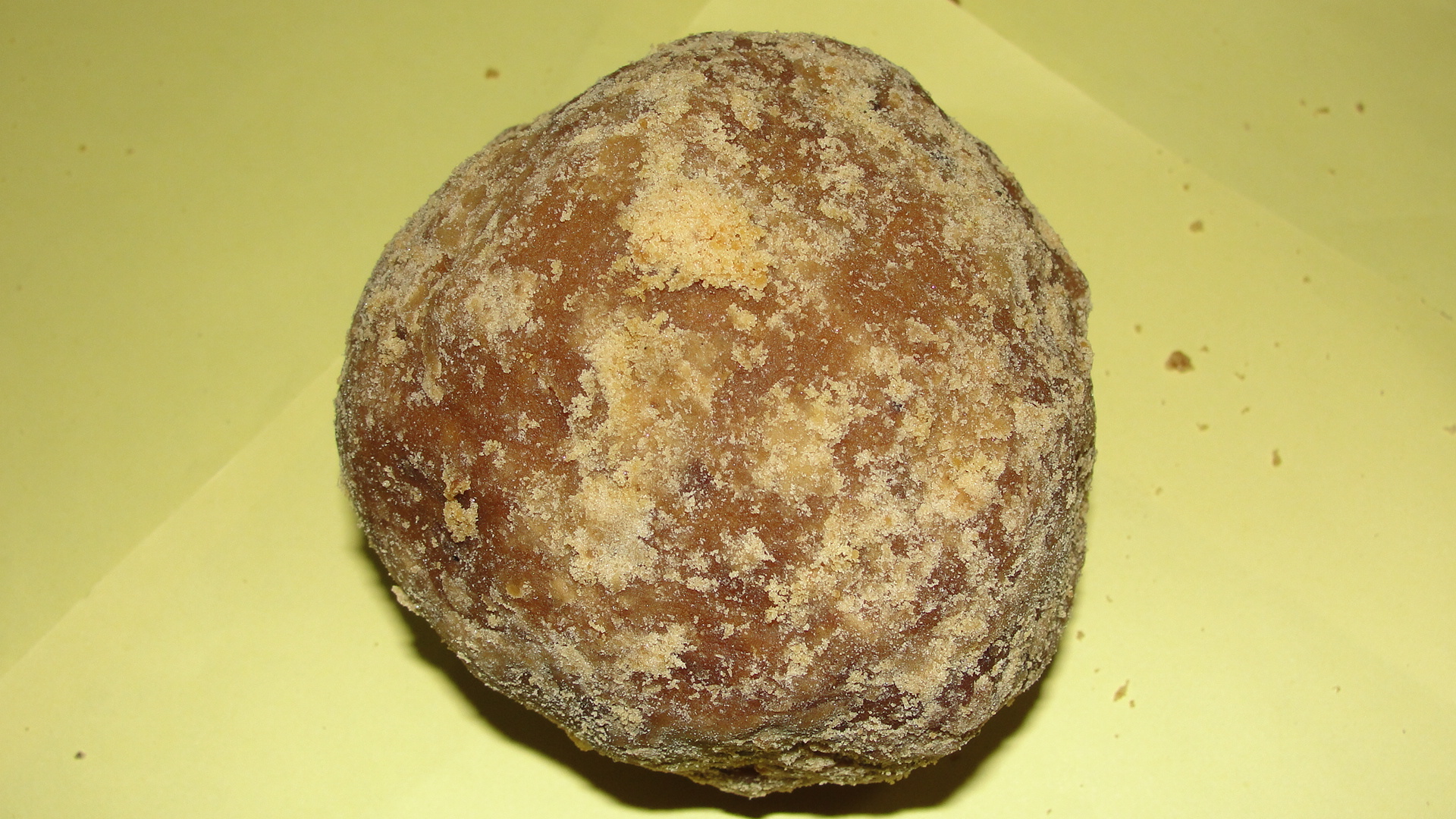
Jaggery blocks, also known as gud

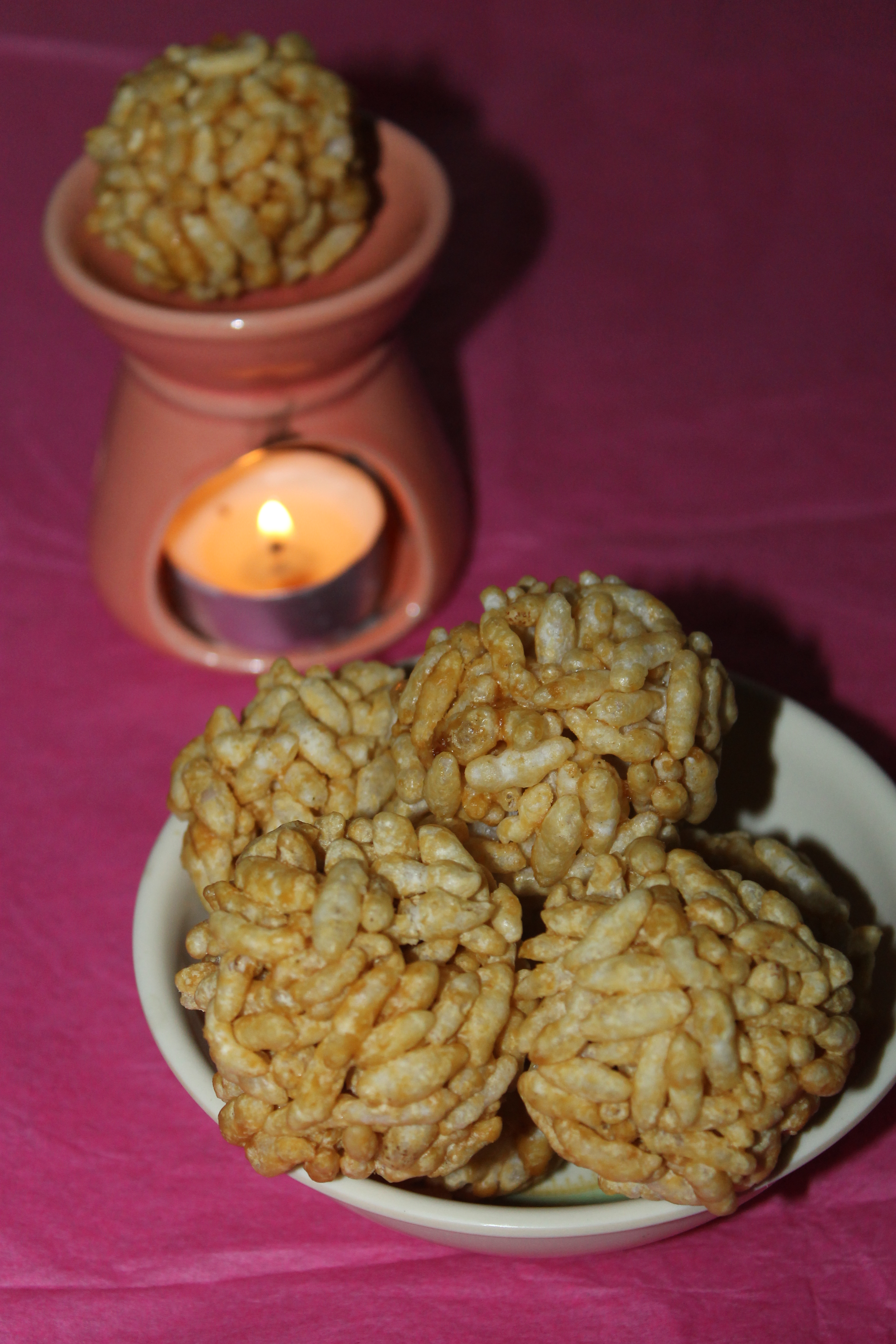
Gur mamra laddu sweets made from jaggery and puffed rice

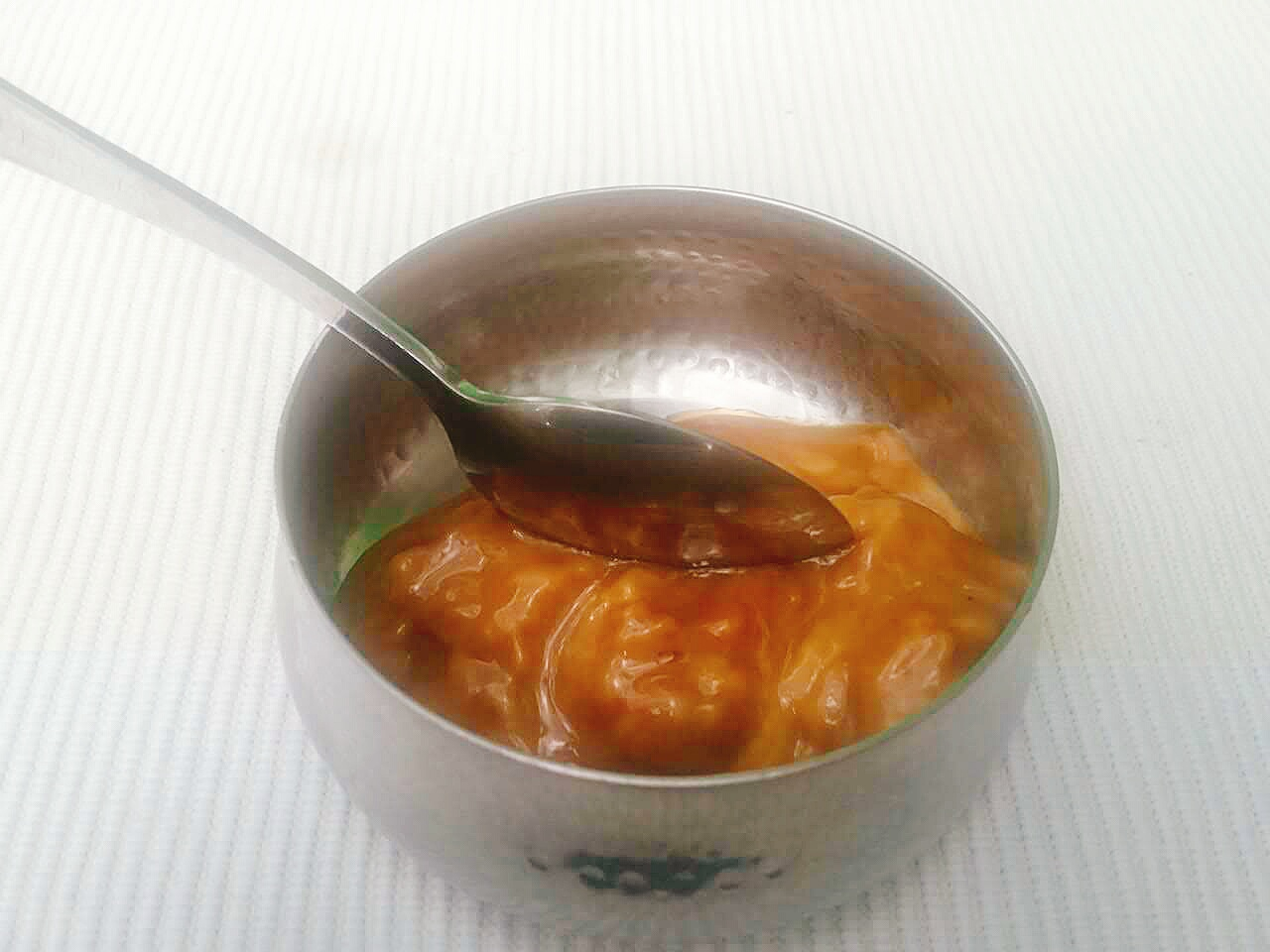
Indian jaggery

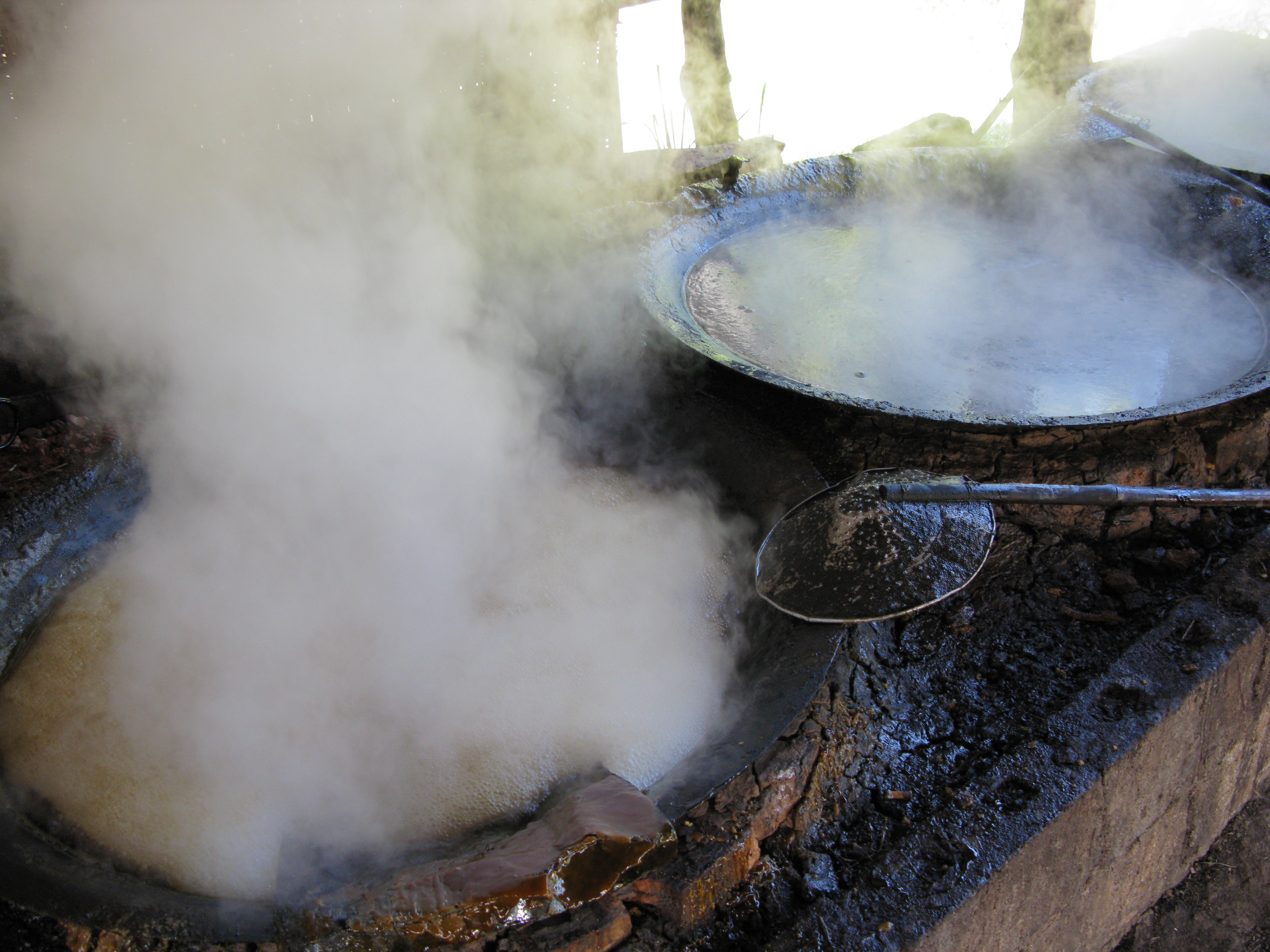
Boiling, Myanmar

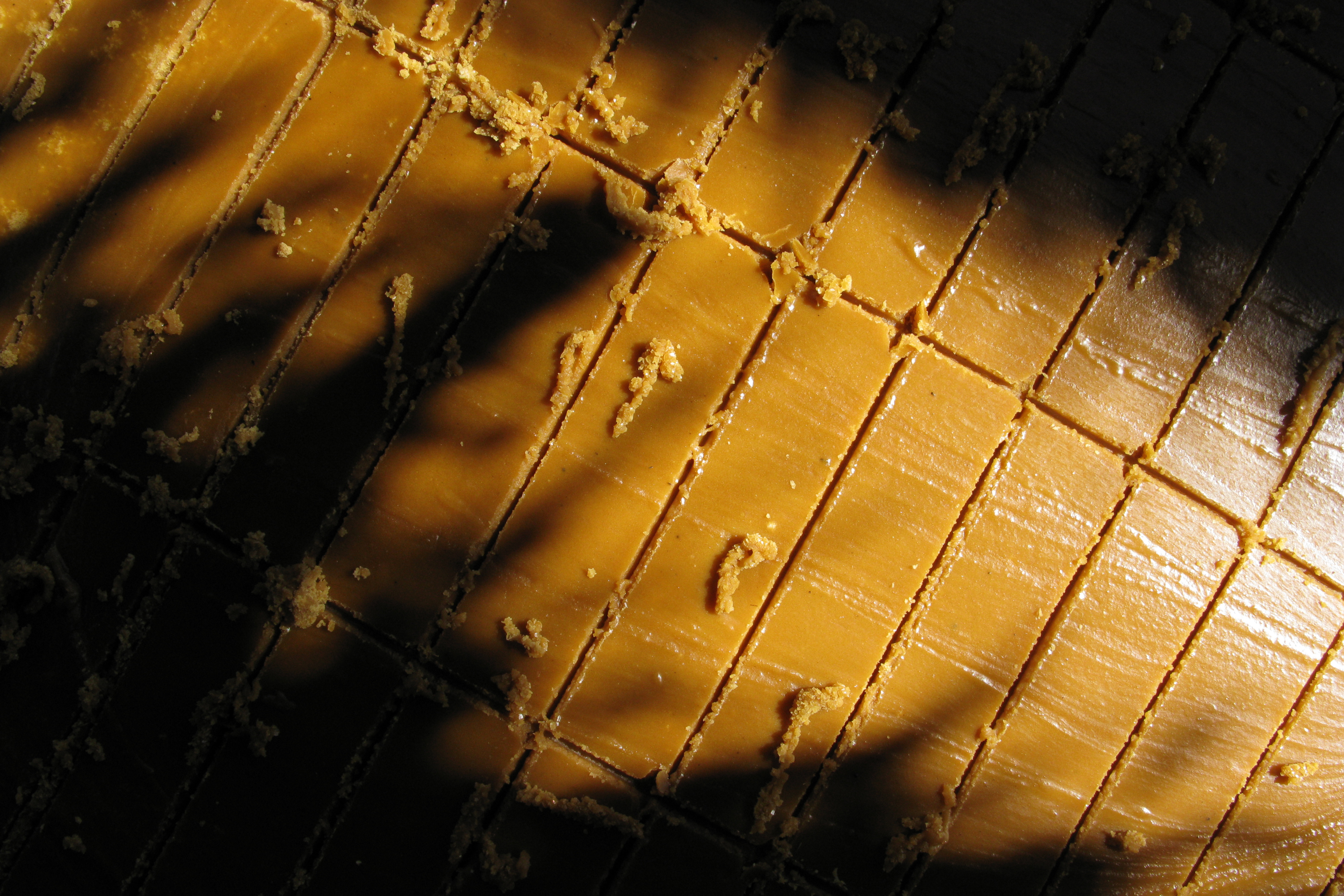
Jaggery, Myanmar

== See also ==
- Brown sugar – Sucrose sugar product with a distinctive brown color
- Caramelization – Process of browning of sugar
- Muscovado – Type of unrefined brown sugar
- Palm sugar – Sugar extracted from the sap of palm trees
- Panela – Unrefined whole cane sugar, typical of Latin America
- Peen tong – Chinese brown sugar
- Piloncillo – Unrefined whole cane sugar, typical of Latin America
- Sugarloaf – Refined sugar molded into a conical shape for commercial distribution
