= Javanese cuisine =

Cuisine of the Javanese people

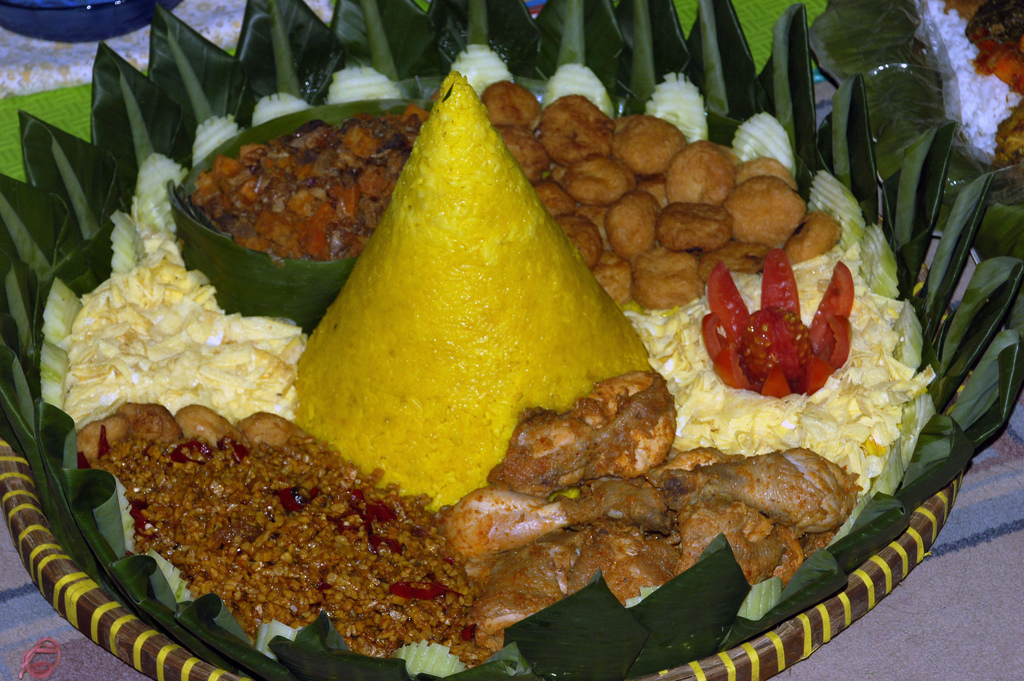
Tumpeng cone-shaped rice surrounded with chicken, omelette eggs, sambal goreng ati (beef liver in sambal), potato perkedel, and tempeh orek. Tumpeng is one of the most famous Javanese dishes.

Javanese cuisine (Javanese: ꦥꦔꦤ꧀ꦤꦤ꧀ꦗꦮ, romanized: panganan jawa) is the cuisine of Javanese people, a major ethnic group in Indonesia in the provinces of Central Java, Yogyakarta, and East Java.

== Definition ==
Javanese cuisine refers exclusively to the cuisine of Javanese people, which is often brought to other regions and countries by Javanese diaspora or foreign descents who have lived in Java.

There are several native ethnic groups who live on the island of Java (Sundanese, Madurese, Betawi, etc.) as well as other peoples of foreign descents. In Indonesian language, Javanese refers to people of Javanese ethnic background.

Javanese cuisine is thought to be sweet, since this is the taste traditionally preferred in Yogyakarta. However, Javanese regions do not only include Yogyakarta.

On the northern and northeastern of Central Java, for instance, the taste tends to be salty and spicy. In East Java, the level of spiciness increases. Today, as Javanese people become more mobile and may move to different regions, this typical stereotype of preferred regional tastes is outdated.

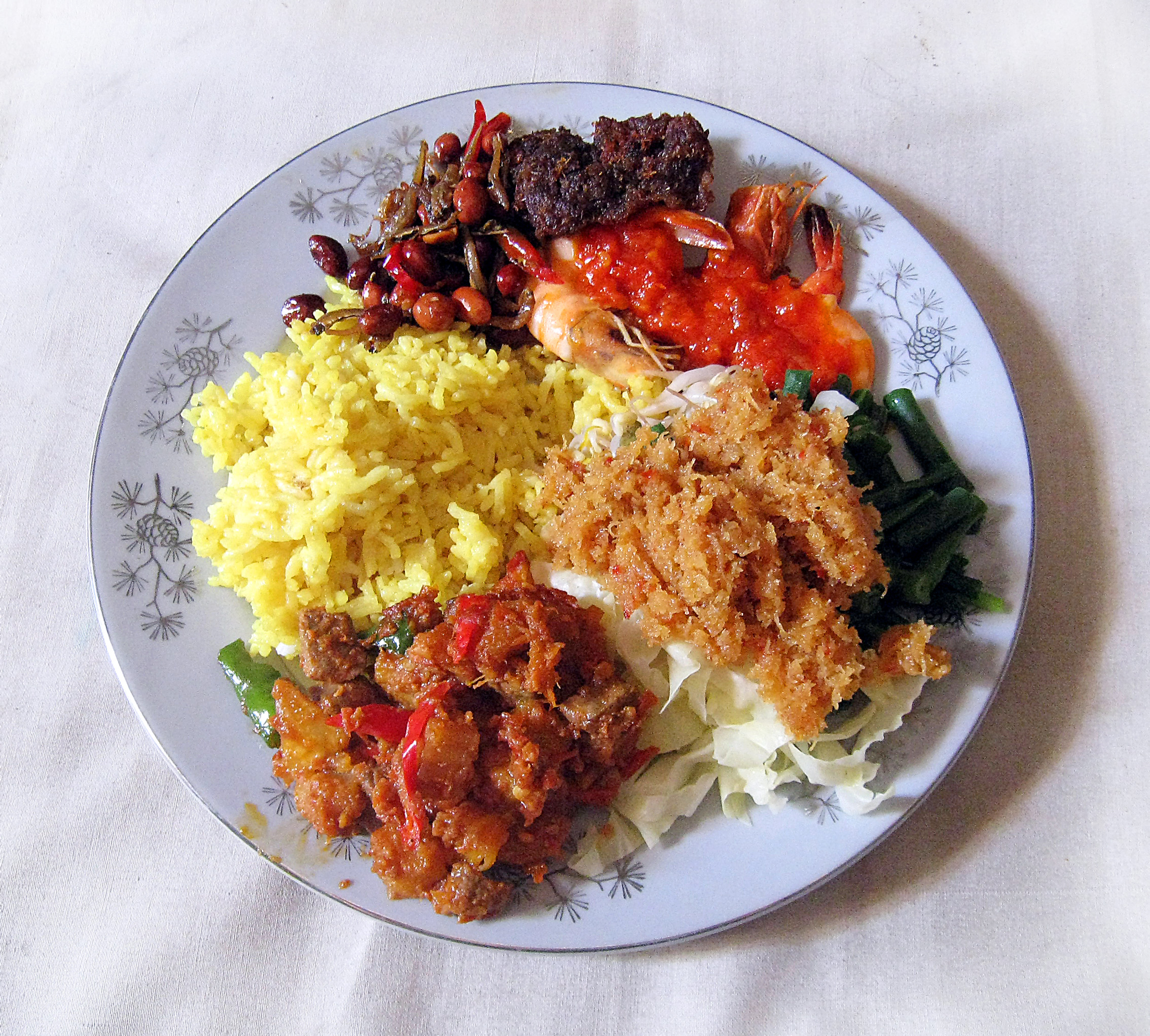
Nasi kuning with urap, fried beef, anchovy and peanuts, potato and shrimp in sambal.

== History ==
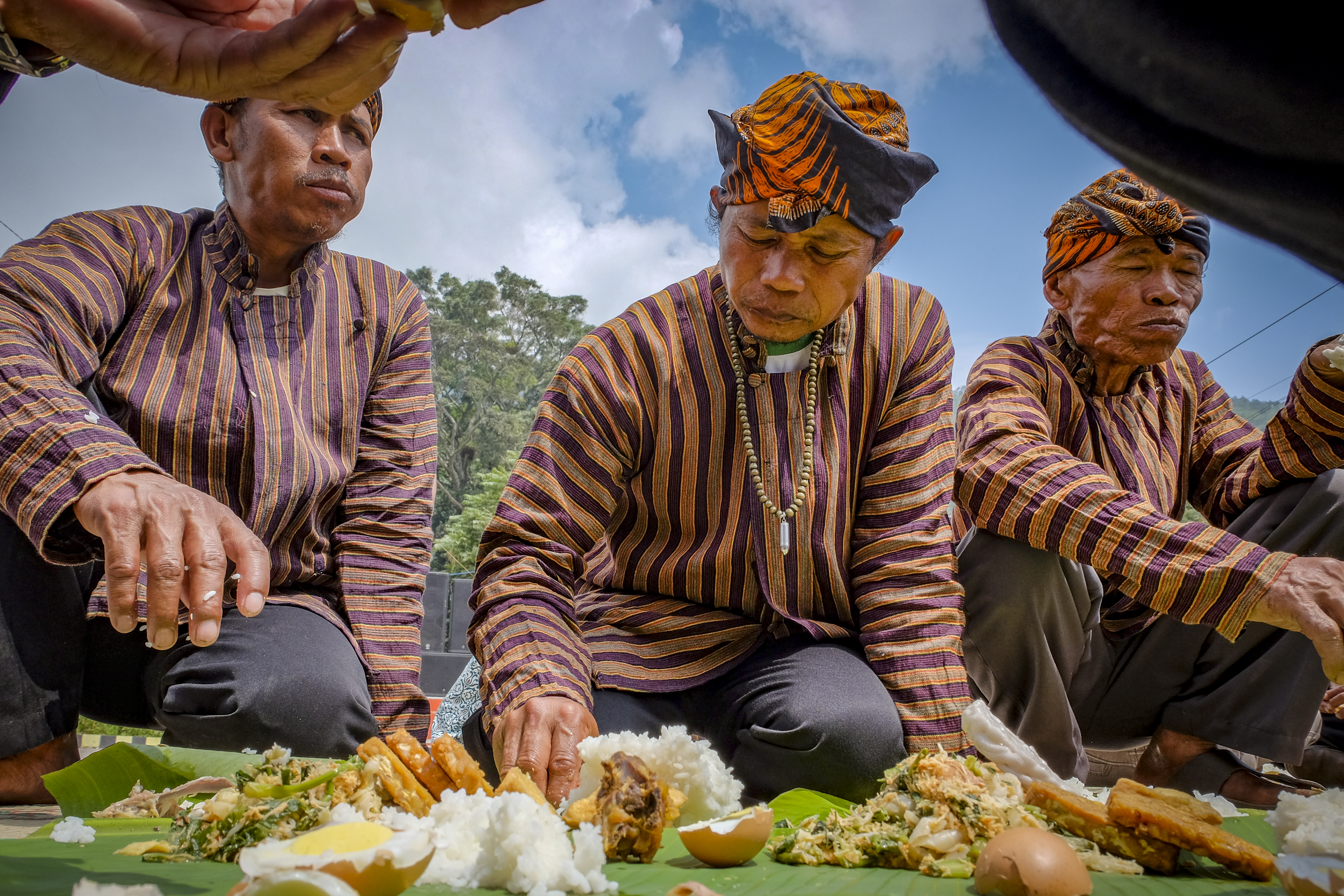
Selamatan traditional Javanese ceremony usually involved a communal feast of eating together.

Ancient dishes and recipes were mentioned in numbers of Javanese prasasti (inscription) and modern historians have succeeded in deciphering some of them. The inscriptions from Medang Mataram era circa 8th to 10th century mentioned several ancient dishes, among others are Hadangan Harang (water buffalo minced meat satay, similar to modern Balinese sate lilit), Hadangan Madura (water buffalo meat with sweet palm sugar), and Dundu Puyengan (eel seasoned with lemon basil). Ancient beverages include Nalaka Rasa (sugarcane juice), Jati Wangi (jasmine beverage), and Kinca (fermented tamarind juice). Also various Kuluban (boiled vegetables served in spices, similar to modern urab) and Phalamula (boiled yams and tubers served with liquid palm sugar).

In Javanese culture, food is an integral part of traditional ceremonies. For example, selamatan ceremony, often performed as a symbol of gratitude, is usually involving a communal feast where participants, guests, and attendees are invited to eat together. Food is usually prepared, cooked and served together. It also symbolizes gotong-royong (working together), guyub (harmonious communal spirit), abundance, and gratitude.

Most of Javanese cuisine is natively developed. Many of the foods have been absorbed to modern Indonesian culture as "national dishes". Some of them have inspired many other regional dishes, such as, lontong (Jav. Lonthong), tumpeng, krupuk, jajan pasar, and many more.

Foreign influences on Javanese food can be seen in some food, such as bakmi and nasi goreng (Chinese), satay (Arab) and kari (Indian).

== Ingredients ==
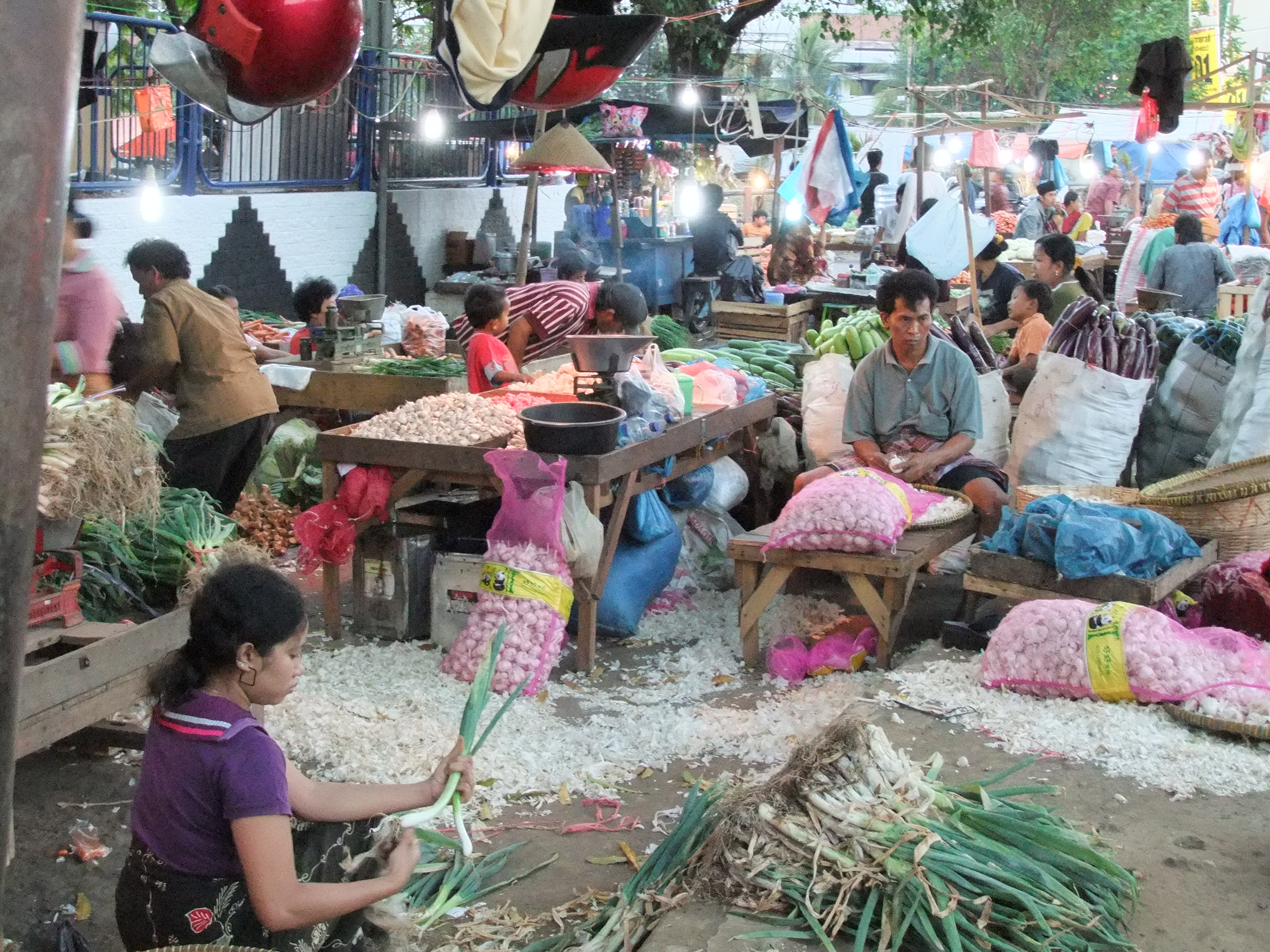
Fresh produce including vegetables on sale in pasar pagi (morning wet market) in Surabaya.

Rice is an important food crop in Java, dating back to ancient times. The Javanese are known to revere Dewi Sri as the Rice Goddess. Steamed rice is the common staple food, and is served at every meal. Tumpeng, a cone-shaped yellow rice is essential in slametan, Javanese traditional ceremonies. Rice can be processed into lontong or ketupat, or cooked in coconut milk as nasi liwet or colored with turmeric as nasi kuning (yellow rice). Other sources of carbohydrate such as gaplek (dried cassava) is sometimes mixed into rice or replaces rice. Gaplek is usually consumed by poor commoners during hard times when rice is scarce. Tubers such as yam, taro, and sweet potato are consumed as snacks in between meals. Bread and grains other than rice are uncommon, although noodles and potatoes are often served as accompaniments to rice. Potatoes are often boiled then mashed, shaped into discs, spiced, coated in beaten eggs and fried into perkedel. Wheat noodles, bihun (rice vermicelli), and kwetiau are influences of Chinese cuisine. The Javanese adopted these ingredients and made them their own by adding kecap manis (sweet soy sauce) and local spices to create bakmi Jawa, bakmi rebus, and bihun goreng. Vegetables feature heavily in Javanese cuisine, notably in vegetable-heavy dishes such as pecel, lotek, and urap.

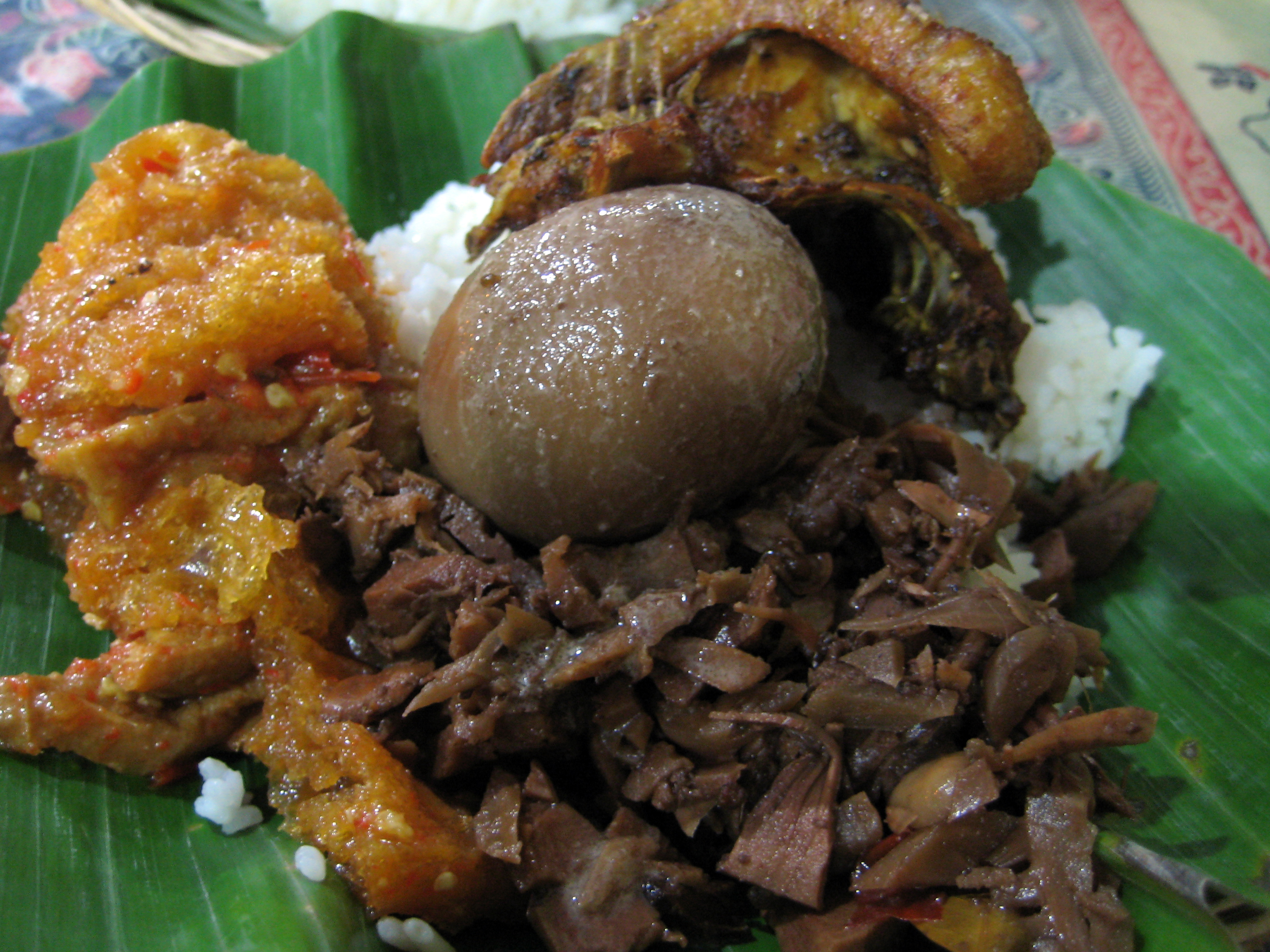
Javanese complete nasi gudeg, which consist of (from top clockwise): krechek (spiced buffalo skin cracker), ayam goreng (fried chicken), opor telur pindang (spiced egg in coconut milk), and gudeg (unripe jackfruit cooked in coconut milk).

Coconut milk, peanut sauce, gula jawa (palm sugar), asem jawa (tamarind), petis, terasi (shrimp paste), shallot, garlic, turmeric, galangal, ginger, and chili sambal are common ingredients and spices that can be found in Javanese cuisine. Freshwater fishes such as carp, tilapia, gourami and catfish are popular, while seafood such as tuna, red snapper, wahoo, ray, anchovy, shrimp, squid, and various salted fish are popular in coastal Javanese cities. Chicken, goat meat, beef, lamb and mutton are popular meats in Javanese cuisine. Next to common farmed chicken, the ayam kampung or free-range chicken, is popular and valued for its leaner, more natural flavors. Almost 90% of Javanese are Muslim, and consequently, much of Javanese cuisine omits pork. However, in small enclaves of Catholic Javanese population around Muntilan, Magelang, Yogyakarta, and Klaten, pork might be consumed. Few ethnic groups in Indonesia use pork and other sources of protein considered haram under Muslim dietary laws in their cuisine, most prominently Balinese cuisine, Indonesian Chinese cuisine, Batak cuisine, and Manado cuisine.

== Outlets ==
Javanese households usually purchase fresh ingredients from the local market every morning, cook and serve them in the late morning to be mainly consumed for lunch. The leftovers are stored to be heated again for family dinner. Other than homemade family dishes, Javanese cuisine are served from humble street-side carts and warungs, to fancy restaurants in five-star hotels. Small family-run warungs are the budget options for street food, serving everything from family dishes for full meals, or snack foods. The popular simple Javanese cuisine establishments are the budget food of Warung Tegal, which are mainly established by Javanese from Tegal city, and the Angkringan street-side carts in Yogyakarta and Solo that sold cheap sego kucing and various wedang (hot beverages).

In Javanese tradition, it is common to dine in lesehan style, which is sitting cross-legged on the mat while dining in front of a short-legged table. It was started as a warung lesehan street food dining popular among tourists along Malioboro street in Yogyakarta. Today, Javanese lesehan food stalls can be found in several cities, including Surakarta, Semarang and Jakarta.

Javanese cuisine outlets

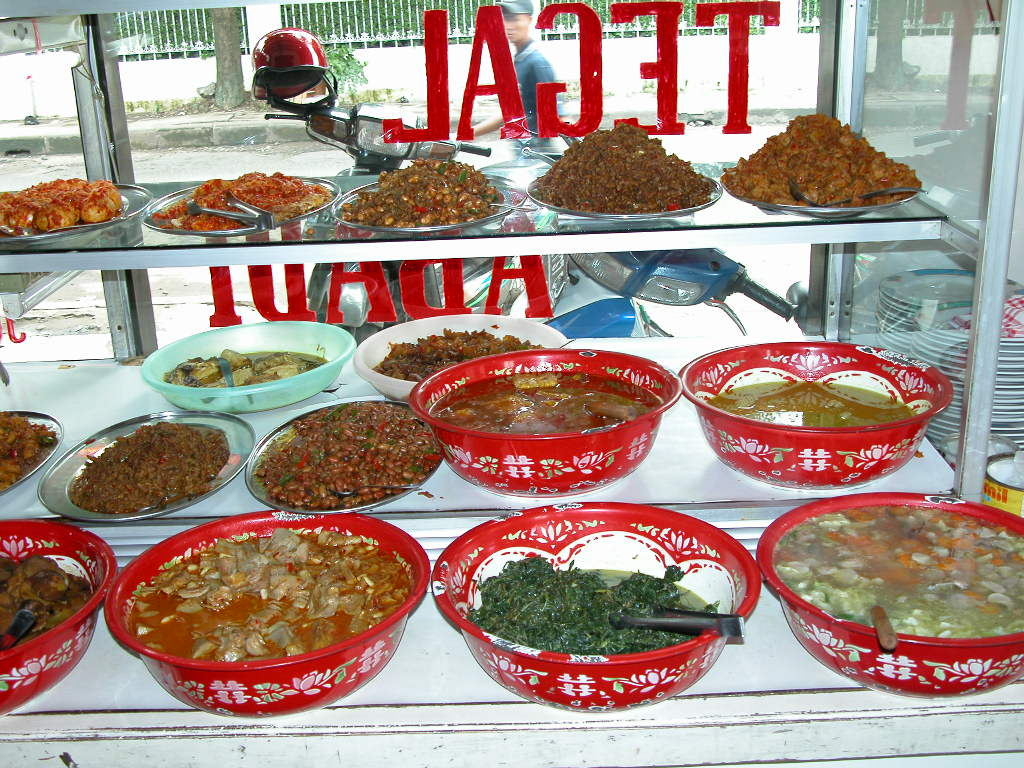
Food display in warung Tegal.

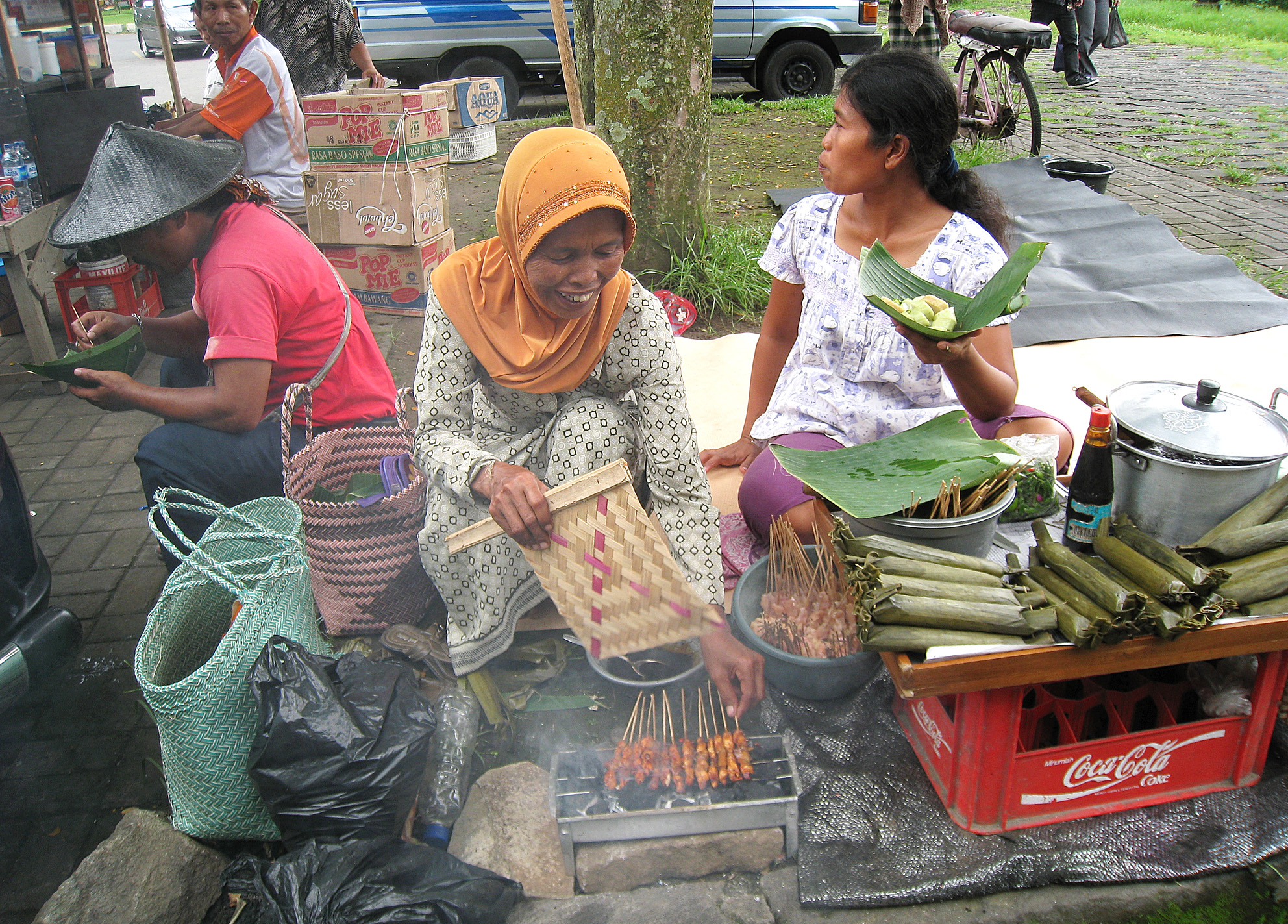
Street-side Javanese chicken satay vendor near Borobudur.

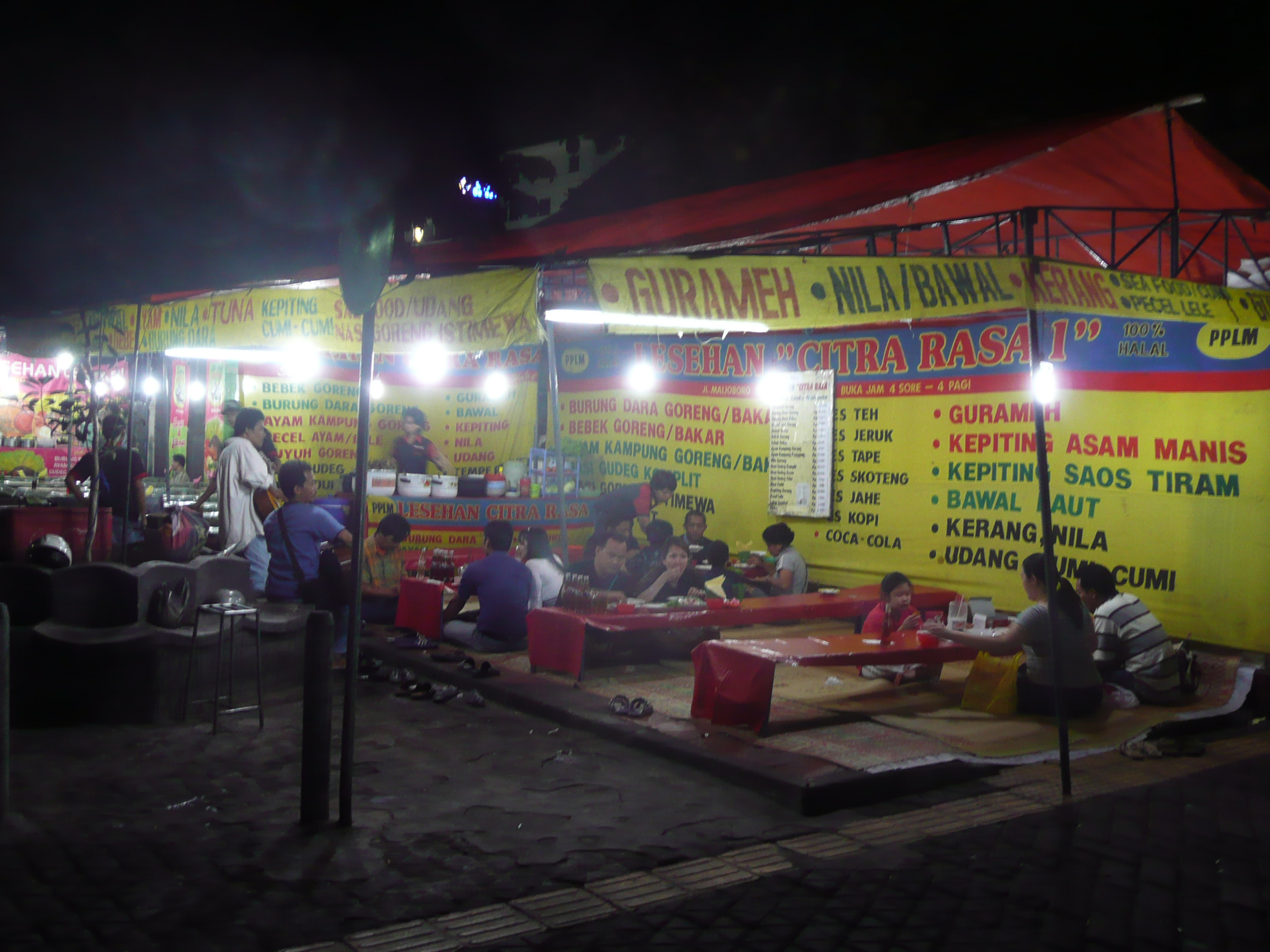
Lesehan sit on the mat dining at Malioboro street, Yogyakarta.

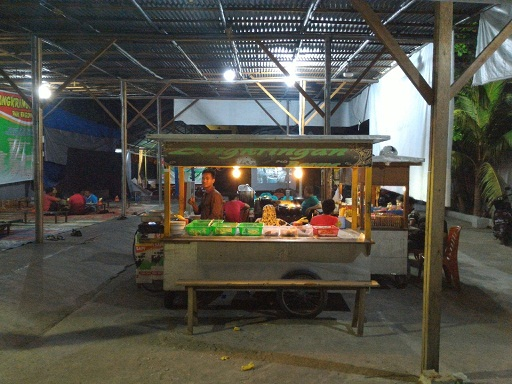
Angkringan food stall.

== Central Javanese cuisine ==
The food in Central Java is influenced by the two ancient kingdoms of Yogyakarta and Surakarta (also commonly known as Solo). Most of Central Javanese dishes are indigenously developed, however in coastal cities such as Semarang and Pekalongan, notable Chinese influences can be seen, such as lumpia (spring roll) and bakmi Jawa. While in the royal court of Surakarta, the European influences can be seen, such as bistik Jawa and selat Solo. Many of Central Java-specific dishes contain the names of the area where the food first became popular, for example:

=== Semarang ===
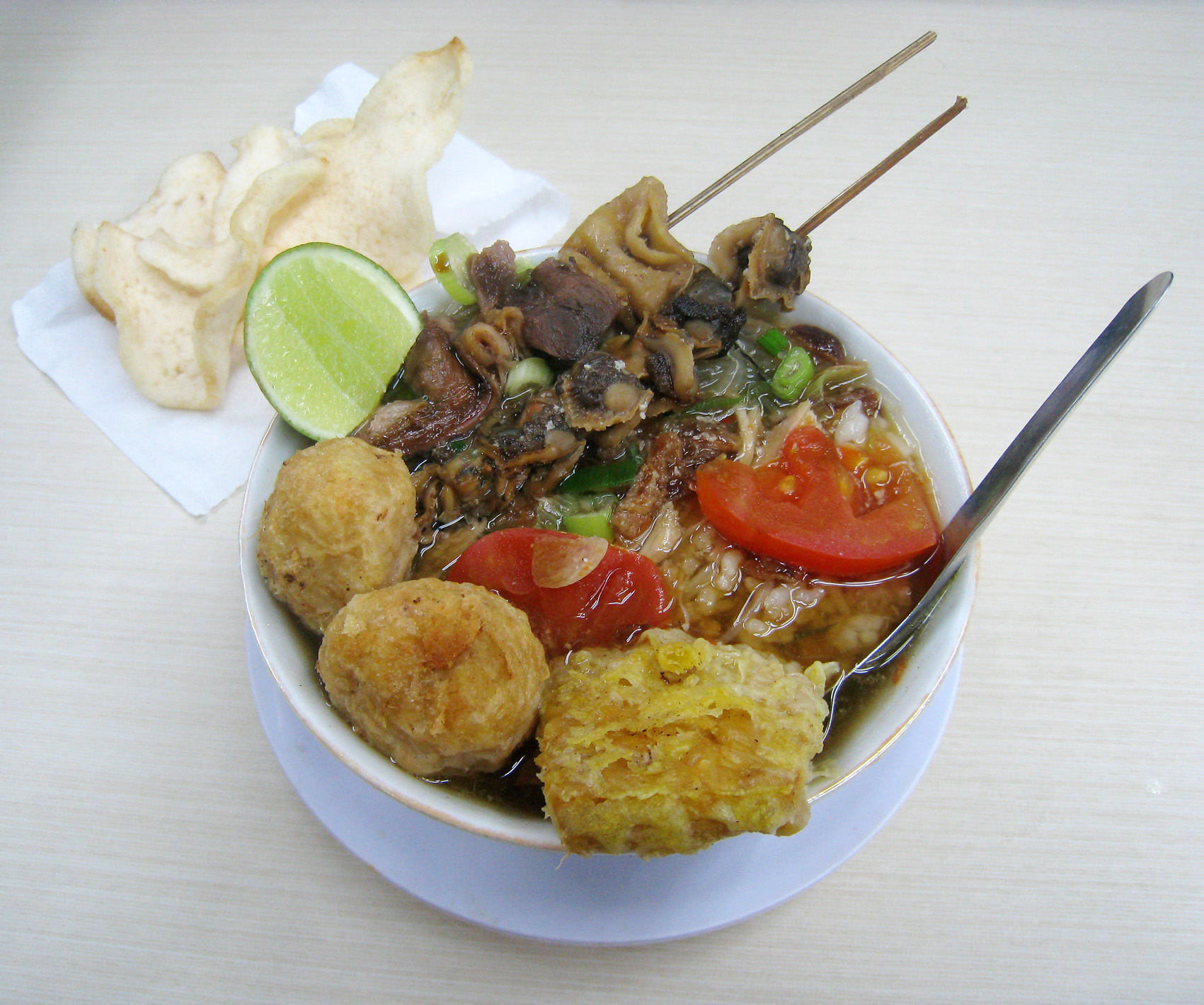
Soto Semarang, a variant of soto from Semarang. It is a chicken soup with rice vermicelli and tomato, served with potato perkedel, fried tempeh, and satay of cockles and chicken intestines, with lime and krupuk (crackers).

- Bandeng Juwana: processed tender boned milkfish originated from the fishing town of Juwana, east of Semarang. Although originated, produced and processed in Juwana, it is largely sold in Semarang.
- Lumpia Semarang: fried or steamed spring rolls. The filling varies, but consists mainly of meat and bamboo shoots. It is served with sweet fermented soybean sauce (tauco) or sweet garlic sauce. Another accompaniment is acar (Indonesian-style sweet and sour cucumber pickle) and chili.
- Nasi ayam: a dish composed of rice, chicken, egg, tofu, and served with a sweet-salty coconut milk gravy.
- Roti ganjel rel, rectangular shaped brown bread with sesame seeds, flavored with cinnamon and palm sugar. Usually served during Dugderan and Ramadan.
- Soto Semarang: a chicken soup in a small personal serving; mixed with rice, perkedel, and satay of cockles, chicken intestines, and quail eggs. One of the famous Soto Semarang is Soto Bangkong. Named after Bangkong crossroad in Semarang.
- Wingko Babat: a cake made largely of glutinous rice and desiccated coconut, toasted and sold warm. Although it originated from Babat, East Java, it is popular in Semarang. Care should be taken to differentiate between Babat and babat. Babat is a city in East Java, part of the North Coast Road and where wingko Babat came from, while babat is tripe, an ingredient often used for Indonesian cuisine in general.

=== Jepara ===
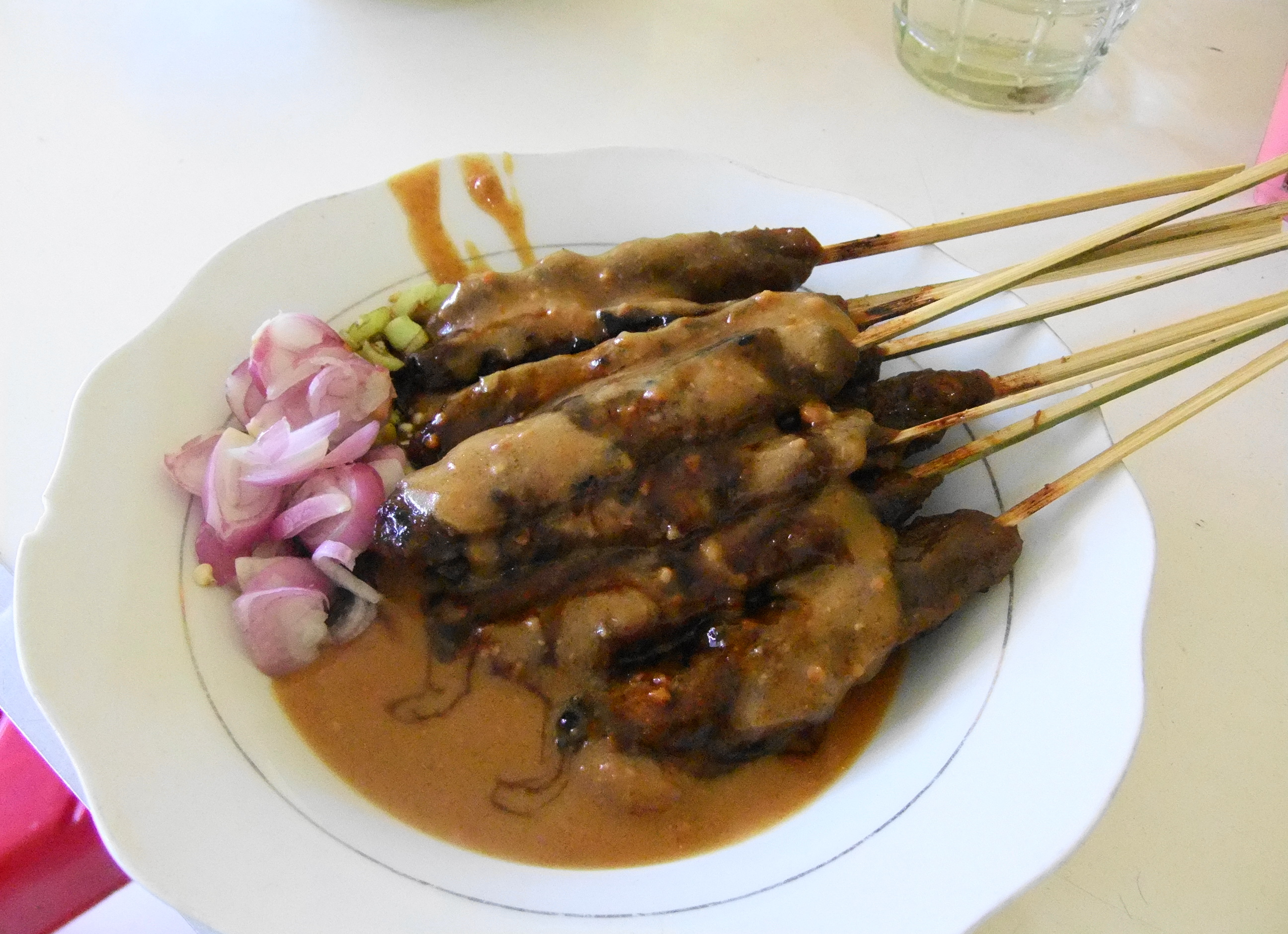
Sate sapi Jepara, Jepara beef satay.

- Soto Jepara: soto is a common Indonesian soup, usually infused with turmeric, and can be made with chicken, beef, or mutton. The version from Jepara, a Central Javanese town, is made of chicken.
- Opor panggang: a typical opor from Jepara. It is a kind of opor ayam but with distinctive flavor, since the chicken used in this dish is first roasted in a clay cauldron.
- Kuluban: traditional salad from Jepara Regency.
- Kelan antep: dish made from lean meat, ginger, bay leaves, red onion, garlic, red chili, tamarind, sugar, and others.
- Horok-horok: steamed corn starch. After being cooked, corn starch is then poured into jars and stirred with a comb. So although chewy and tough, it is shaped in small granules resembling Styrofoam. To add flavor, a pinch of salt can be added. This dish can be served as an accompaniment to meatballs, gado-gado, pecel, or satay kikil (beef tendon).
- Hoyok-hoyok: also called oyol-oyol, is a dish made from tapioca flour mixed with water and oil, then served with extra grated coconut. Hoyok-hoyok is a sweet version of horok-horok.
- Jepara shrimp soup: similar to shrimp soup in general. This version of soup use shrimp broth and fried shrimp, also raw crushed chili. This soup is delicious eaten while still hot or warm.
- Jepara pangsit soup: considered as a fusion cuisine, this dish is a blend of local and foreign cuisines, i.e. Javanese, Dutch, and Chinese. The pangsit (dumpling) in this soup is not like the dumpling we know, but rather in the form of a clear soup with shrimp egg rolls. This is one of the favorite dishes of R.A. Kartini.
- Bongko mento: originated in Jepara palace, it is a snack wrapped in a banana leaf. Consists of omelet filled with sauteed shredded chicken breast mixed with oyster mushrooms, glass noodles, and coconut milk.
- Lontong krubyuk: similar to lontong dishes in general, this dish consists of rice cake served with shredded chicken meat stews doused in bakso soup and garnished with a mixture of half-cooked bean sprouts and sliced celery. What distinguishes this from other lontong dishes, this dish is served with a lot of soup.
- Singit: beef shank cooked in coconut milk, soy sauce, salt, red chili, garlic, onion, and brown sugar, over low heat until the sauce thickens.
- Semur Jepara: made of meat, salt, pepper, nutmeg powder, soy sauce, cooking oil, and others.
- Sayur pepaya Jepara: a vegetable stew usually served in the afternoon. The main ingredients are young papaya, coconut milk, beef stew, and others.
- Sayur asem Jepara: similar to sayur asem Jakarta.
- Sayur betik: a vegetable stew, using young unripe papaya and beef trimming as the main ingredients.
- Gule petih Jepara: made of tender goat meat and spice mixture. Usually served during Eid al-Fitr and Eid al-Adha.
- Laksa Jepara: made of chicken fillet, banana shrimp, chicken stock, coconut milk, lemongrass, kaffir lime leaves, salt, sugar, oil, and other ingredients.
- Sayur keluak ayam: made of vegetables, keluak and chicken.
- Kagape kambing: a dish made of goat meat. Easily found during Eid al-Adha.
- Bakso Karimunjawa: meatballs soup made from fish, instead of beef or chicken.
- Tongseng cumi: tongseng made of calamari or squid, instead of goat or chicken.
- Rempah Jepara: a dish made from grated coconut, fish, and others.
- Bontosan: a dish of mashed grouper or mackerel mixed with rice powder and shaped into spindles, wrapped in banana leaves or plastic, steamed, then thickly sliced, and served with sauce or gravy. Bontosan is actually the pre-dried form of fish crackers. It can also be served after being shallow-fried until the outside is crisp and golden brown. Similar in taste to pempek.
- Sate sapi Jepara: satay made of cow meat mixed with spices typical of Jepara.
- Sate kikil: a satay dish made of kikil (beef tendon), also called satay cecek. Usually served with horok-horok.
- Pecel ikan laut panggang: roasted saltwater fish served with coconut milk sauce.
- Tempong: uncooked dried anchovy, shaped like fritter.

=== Kudus ===
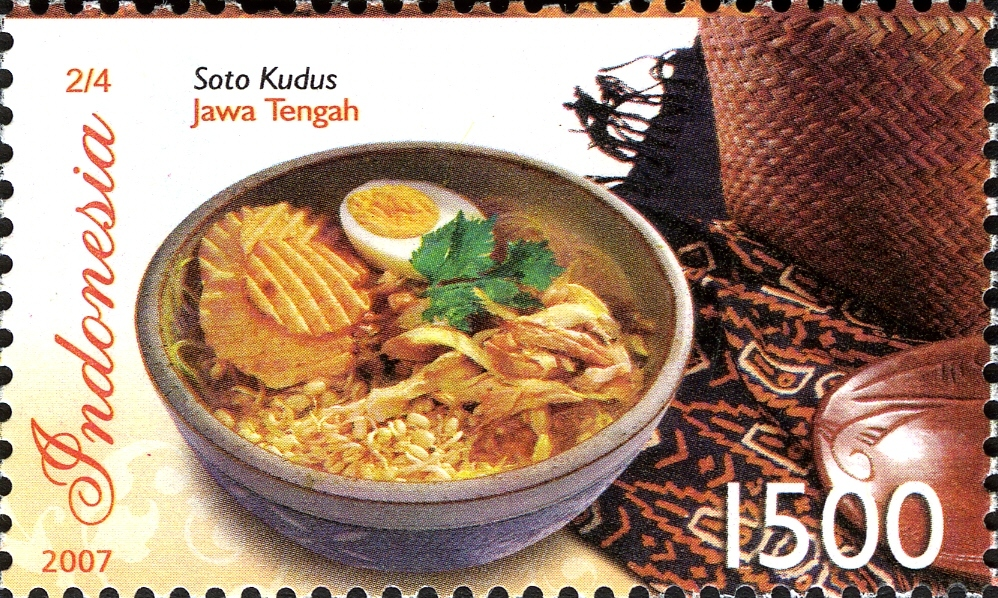
Indonesian stamp displaying soto Kudus.

- Jenang Kudus: A sweetmeat made from rice flour, palm sugar, and coconut milk.
- Opor bakar
- Soto Kudus: soto is a common Indonesian soup usually infused with turmeric, and can be made with chicken, beef, or mutton. The version from Kudus, a Central Javanese town, is made of chicken.

=== Pati ===
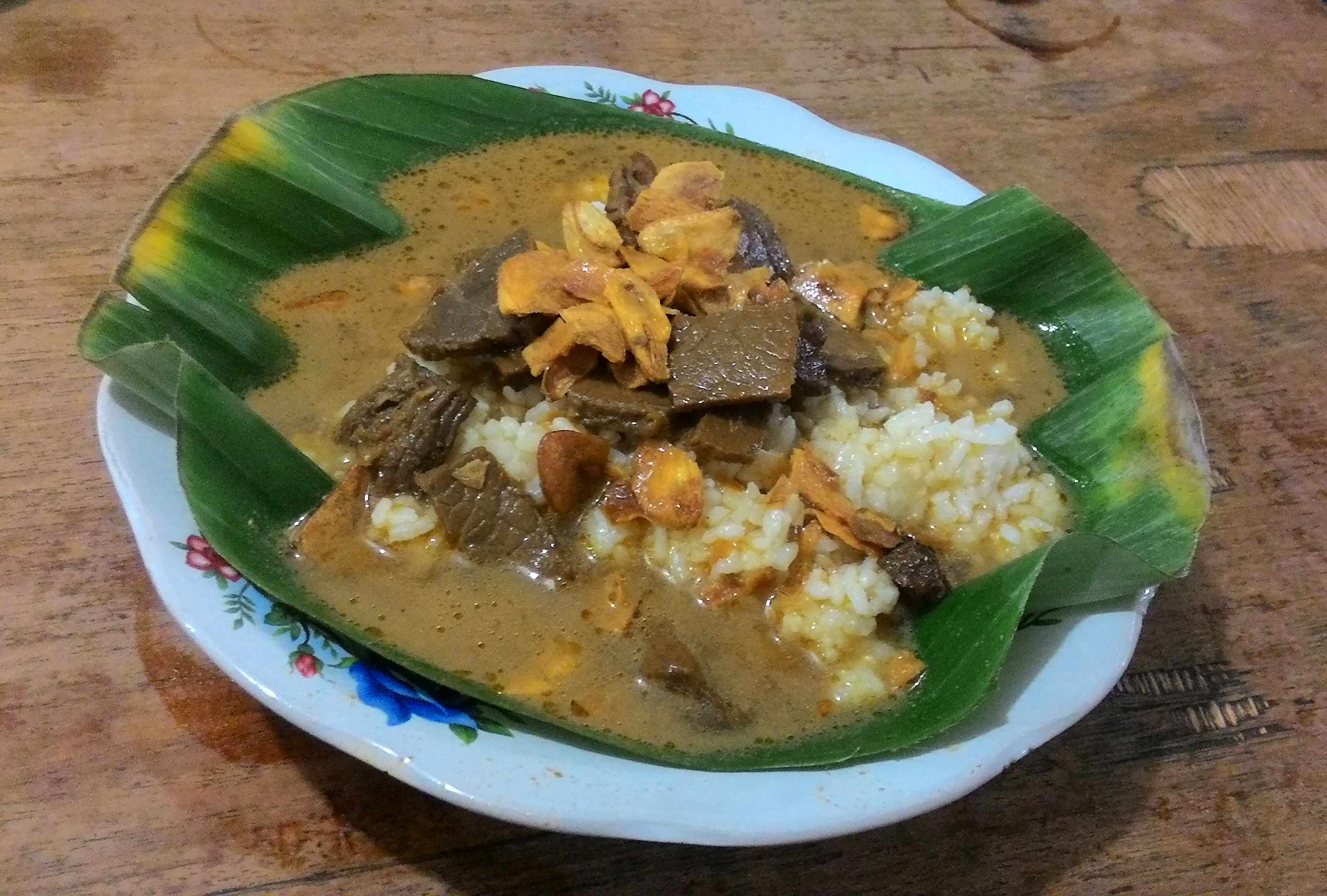
Nasi Gandul

- Bandeng presto: is a pressure cooked milkfish that soften the finer fish bones. The pressure cooking also help the spices to seep into the flesh of milkfish perfectly.
- Nasi gandul: is beef served on white steamed rice poured with spicy savoury soup, served on banana leaf.
- Petis runting: is a kind of gulai typical culinary of Pati. Soupy but somewhat viscous, made from a rather coarse rice flour roasted with goat meat and balungan or goat bones, including bone marrows, and usually enjoyed while it hot to avoid the fatty bone marrow coagulating.
- Sayur mangut: is a hot and spicy Ariid catfish head cooked in coconut milk.
- Sayur tempe bosok: is a kind of curry-soup made from stinky over-ripe (almost rotten) tempeh. Popularly consumed during the rainy season against the cold.
- Soto kemiri: is a common Javanese chicken soup spiced with candlenut.

=== Yogyakarta ===
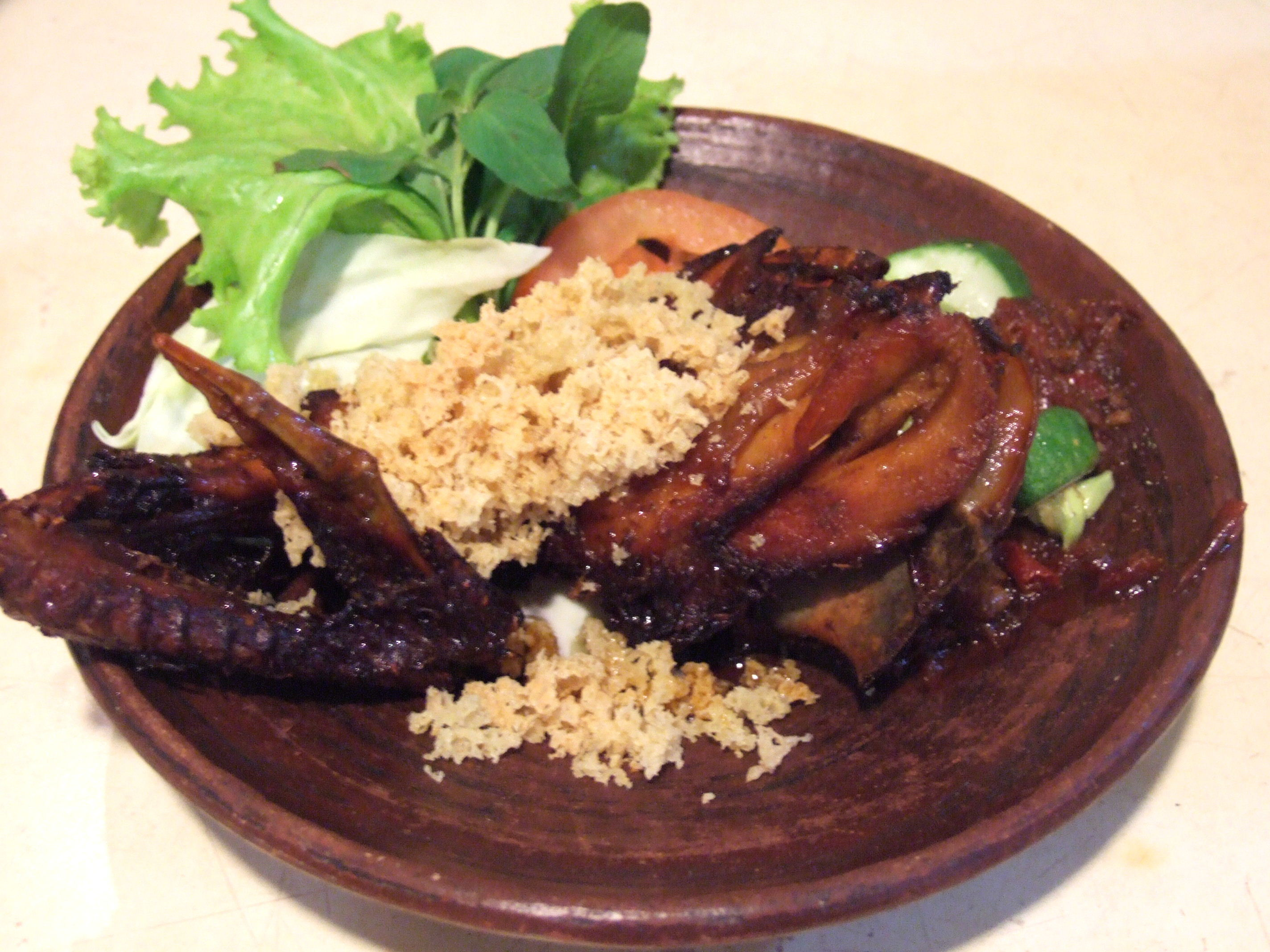
Ayam goreng Kalasan with kremes, seasoned fried chicken with crispy fried flour granules.

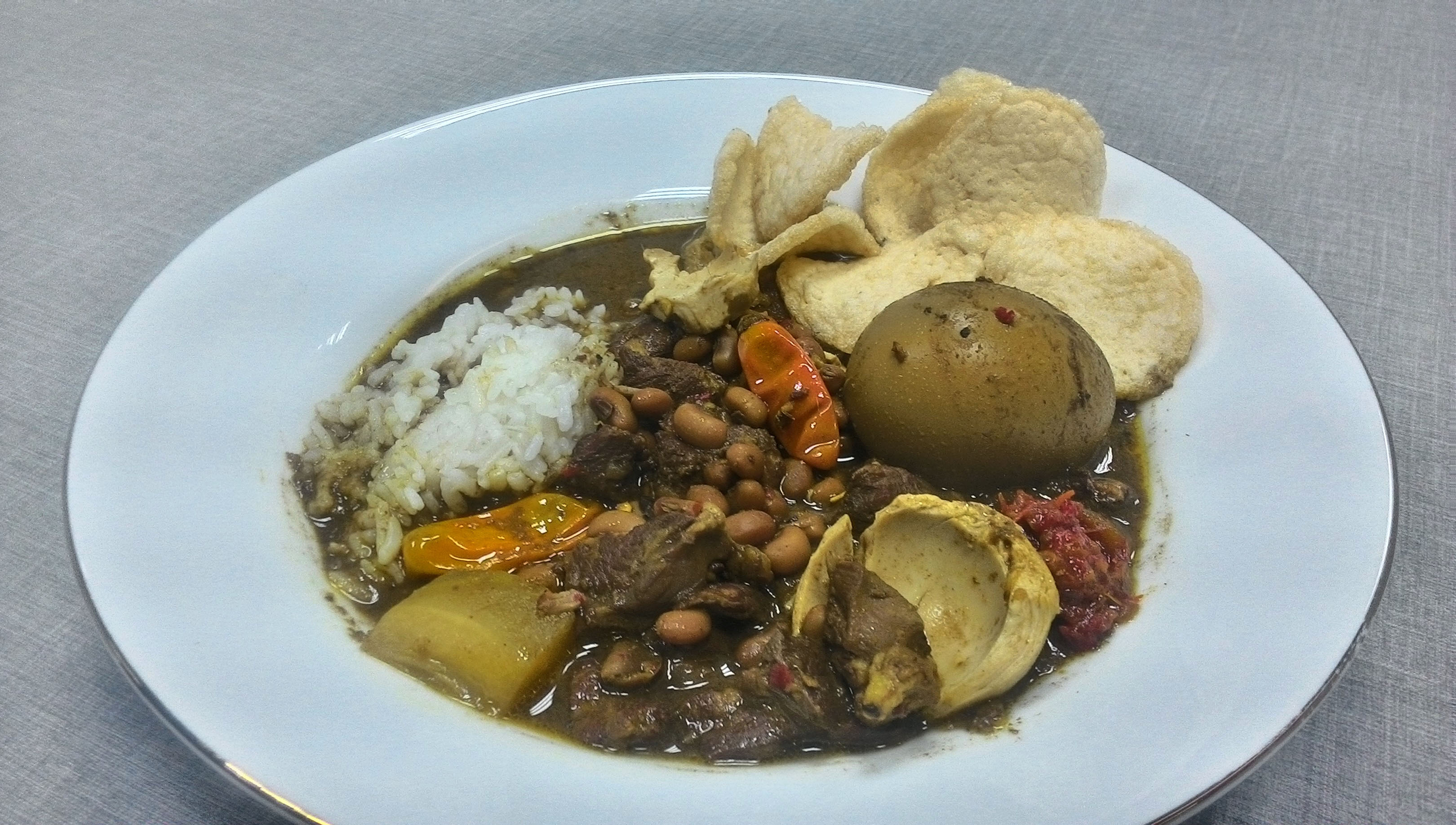
Nasi brongkos, spicy meat and beans stew.

- Ayam geprek: crispy battered fried chicken crushed and mixed with hot and spicy sambal.
- Ayam goreng Kalasan: chicken stewed in coriander, garlic, candlenut, and coconut water, then deep-fried until crispy. Served with sambal and raw vegetables.
- Bakpia and bakpia pathok: a sweet pastry filled with sugared mung bean paste, derived from the Chinese pastry. A well-known bakpia-producing area is Pathok near Jalan Malioboro, where bakpia Pathok is sold.
- Belalang goreng: fried grasshopper dish.
- Brongkos: spicy meat and tolo beans (black-eyed peas) stew in coconut milk and kluwek soup with other spices.
- Gudeg: a traditional food from Yogyakarta and Central Java made from young unripe nangka (jack fruit) boiled for several hours with palm sugar and coconut milk. This is usually accompanied by opor ayam (chicken in coconut milk), telur pindang (hard boiled egg stew), and krechek (spicy beef skin and tofu stew). Gudeg from Yogyakarta has a unique sweet and savory taste, and is drier and more reddish than other regional variants because of the addition of Javanese teak leaf.
- Kipo: derived from the Javanese question Iki opo? ("What is this?"), a small sweet snack from Kotagede made of glutinous rice flour and coconut milk dough filled with grated coconut and palm sugar.
- Krechek (also known as krecek or sambal goreng krechek): a traditional spicy beef skin dish made from seasoned krupuk kulit (beef skin crackers). Krechek is usually served as a side dish together with gudeg.
- Nasi kucing: rice with small side dishes.

=== Solo ===
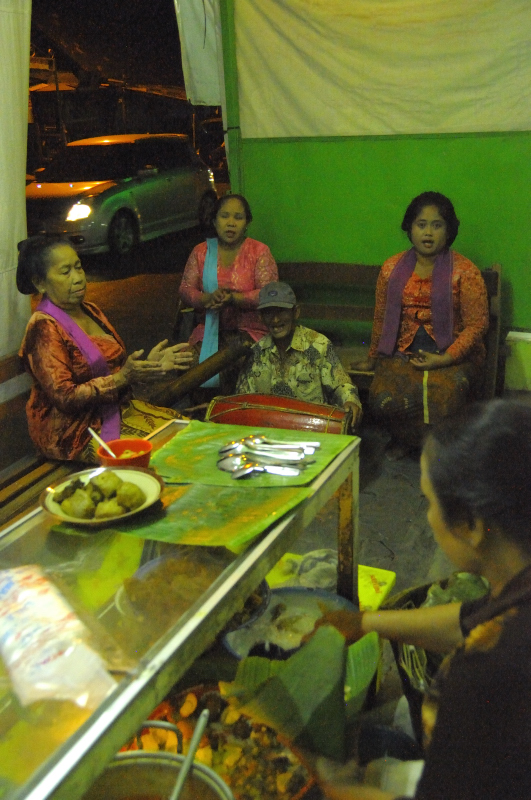
Nasi liwet warung in Solo.

- Bakso Solo: bakso literally means meatballs, made of beef, and served in boiling hot soup with mung bean-thread noodles, green vegetables, shredded cabbage, and various sauces (chili, tomato). This version from Solo has super-sized meatballs, the size of tennis balls. Also known as Bakso Tenis. Bakso is a Chinese-influenced dish, but has become a popular snack throughout Indonesia.
- Bistik Jawa: Javanese beef steak, a European-influenced dish from Solo.
- Nasi liwet: a rice dish cooked in coconut milk and chicken broth, served with meat and vegetable side dishes.
- Sate buntel (lit: wrapped satay): Minced fatty beef or goat meat, encased in caul fat and wrapped around a bamboo skewer then grilled. The size of this satay is quite large, very similar to a Middle Eastern kebab. After being grilled on charcoal, the meat is separated from the skewer, cut into bite-size chunks, then served in sweet soy sauce and merica (pepper).
- Selat Solo: a salad consisting of stewed beef, lettuce, carrot, green bean, and potato chips or French fries in sweet spiced dressing.
- Sosis solo, Javanese sausages made from beef or chicken and coated by egg.
- Srabi Solo: a pancake made of coconut milk, mixed with a little rice flour as thickener. Srabi can be served plain or with toppings, such as sliced banana, chopped jackfruit, chocolate sprinkle (muisjes), or cheese.
- Tongseng: a strongly spiced curry of bone-in mutton, which is quickly stir-fried at the point of sale with vegetables added.
- Tengkleng: goat ribs and offal in a curry-like soup, similar to gule kambing, but with a lighter and thinner soup.
- Timlo Solo: a beef and vegetable soup. Some versions also have noodles.

=== Banyumas ===
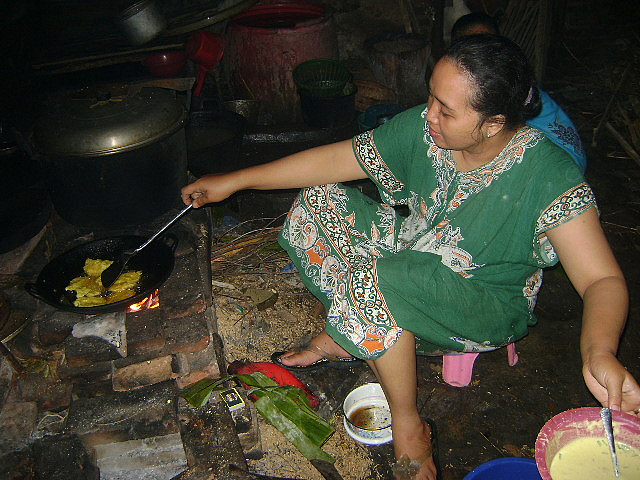
Frying tempeh mendoan.

Refers to Javanese cultural region of Western Central Java bordering West Java, including Banyumas, Tegal, Brebes, Cilacap, Kebumen, Purbalingga, and Banjarnegara.

- Nasi bogana Tegal: a steamed rice dish wrapped in banana leaves and served with a variety of side dishes.
- Sate Tegal or Sate Balibul: juvenile (five-month-old) goat satay from Tegal, noted for its tender meat.
- Sate Ambal: a satay variant from Ambal, Kebumen, Central Java. This satay uses ayam kampung (free-range chicken). The sauce is not made from peanuts, but rather ground tempeh, chili, and spices. The chicken is marinated for about two hours to make the meat tastier. This satay is served with ketupat.
- Sroto Sokaraja: a variant of soto from Sokaraja, Banyumas.
- Tempeh mendoan: fried battered tempeh from Banyumas.

=== Other Central Javanese cuisine ===
- Bakmoy: small cubes of fried tofu, chicken, and boiled egg served with chicken broth and relish made from sweet soy sauce.
- Kamir: round-shaped bread that almost similar to apem, consisting of flour, butter, and egg mixture.
- Krechek: spicy stew made from skin cracker, potato and soy beans.
- Mie kopyok (lit. shaked noodles): a noodle soup made of garlic broth, rice cake, fried tofu, and rice cracker.
- Mie ongklok: boiled noodles were made using cabbage, chunks of chopped leaves, and starchy thick soup called loh. Usually served with satay and tempeh.
- Nasi megono, rice dish with chopped young jackfruit mixed with coconut and other spices.
- Sate Blora: chicken satay from Blora area.
- Sop senerek, traditional soup from Magelang with beef, red bean, carrot, tomato, celery, and fried shallots.
- Swikee Purwodadi: frogs' legs cooked in fermented soybean (tauco) soup.

== East Javanese cuisine ==
The East Javanese cuisine is largely influenced by Madurese cuisine - Madura being a major producer of salt, hence the omission of sugar in many dishes. Many of the East Javanese dishes are also typically Madurese, such as soto Madura and sate Madura, usually sold by Madurese settlers. Notable Arabic and Indian cuisine influence also can be found such in the coastal cities of Tuban, Gresik, Surabaya, Lamongan, and Sidoarjo, due to the large number of Arabic descendants in these cities. Although there are many dishes with town names attached to them, local versions of these are available in every town. The most popular town-associated dishes are:

=== Madiun ===
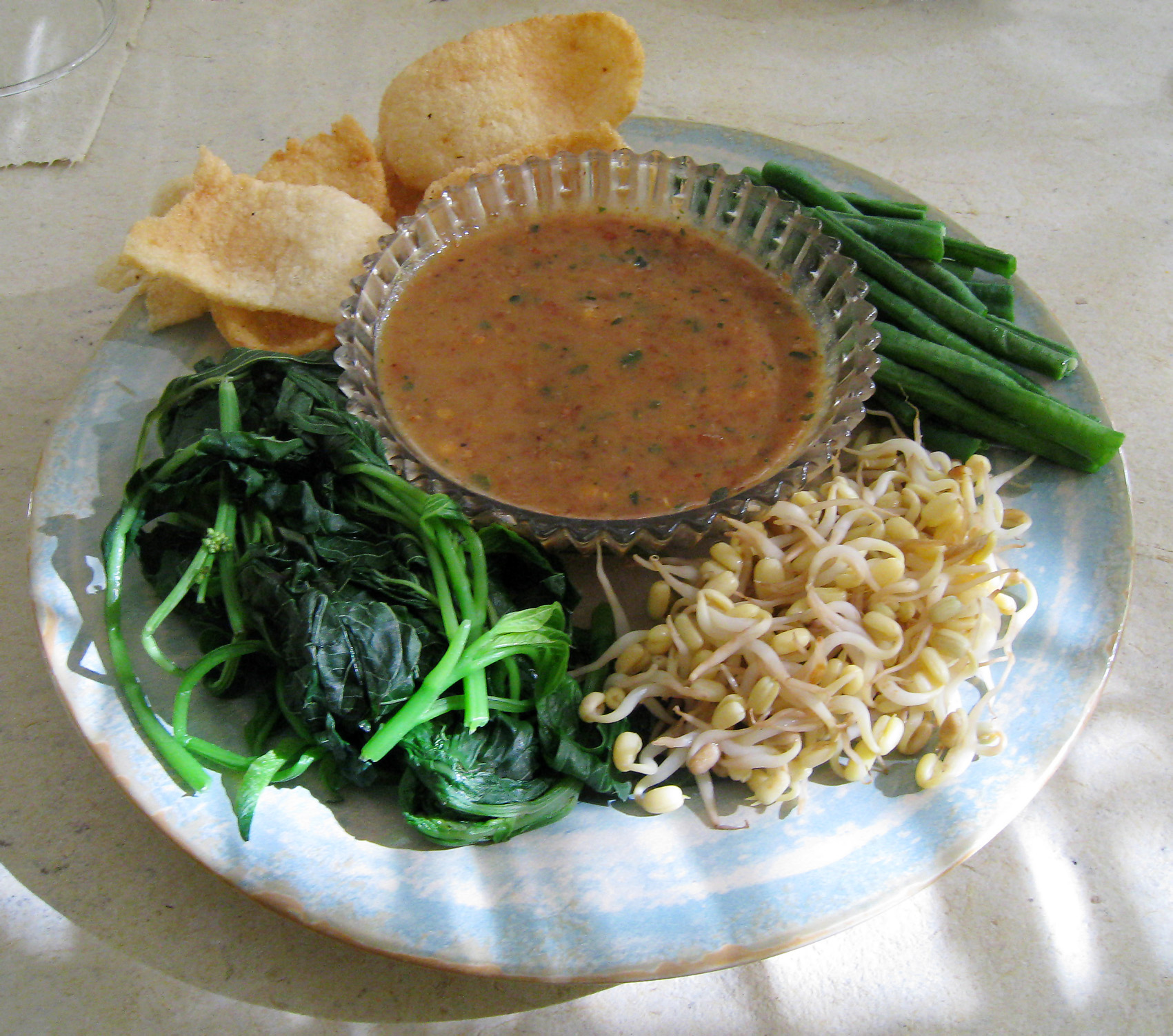
Pecel, boiled vegetables served with peanut sauce.

- Brem Madiun: fermented sugar and cassava cakes.
- Pecel Madiun: a salad of boiled vegetables, dressed in a peanut-based spicy sauce. It is usually served as an accompaniment to rice. A peanut or dried fish/shrimp cracker (rempeyek) is served on the side. Not to be confused with pecel lele, which is deep-fried local catfish served with sambal.

=== Lamongan ===
- Ayam penyet: fried chicken (see ayam goreng), lightly smashed using a pestle in a mortar laced with sambal.
- Bebek goreng: deep fried duck, similar to duck confit.
- Pecel lele: deep fried catfish with sambal, vegetables, and rice.
- Soto Lamongan: chicken soup originated from the town of Lamongan.
- Tahu campur: fried tofu, served in petis-based beef stew.

=== Surabaya ===
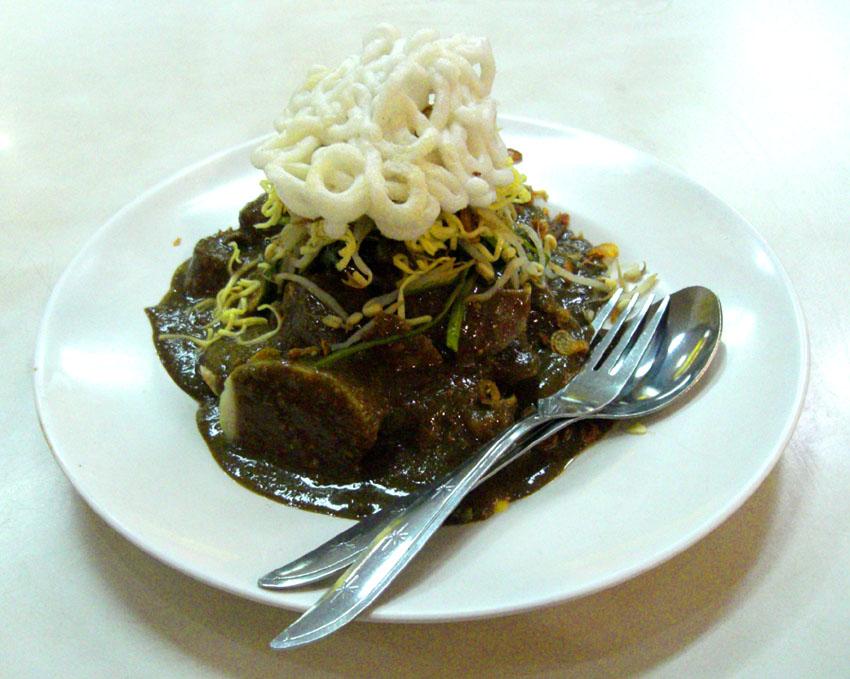
Rujak cingur, specialty of Surabaya.

- Ayam penyet: "smashed chicken", fried chicken that is smashed with the pestle against mortar to make it softer, served with sambal, slices of cucumbers, fried tofu and tempeh.
- Lontong kupang: lontong with small cockles in petis sauce.
- Rawon Surabaya: a dark beef soup, served with mung bean sprouts and the ubiquitous sambal. The dark (almost black) color comes from the kluwak (Pangium edule) nuts.
- Rujak cingur: a marinated cow snout or lips and noses (cingur), served with boiled vegetables and shrimp crackers. It is then dressed in a sauce made of caramelized fermented shrimp paste (petis), peanuts, chili, and spices. It is usually served with lontong, a boiled rice cake. Rujak cingur is considered traditional food of Surabaya in East Java.
- Semanggi: a salad made of boiled semanggi (M. crenata) leaves that grow in paddy fields. It is dressed in a spicy peanut sauce.

=== Madura ===
- Sate Madura: originating on the island of Madura, near Java, is a famous variant among Indonesians. Most often made from mutton or chicken, the recipe's main characteristic is the black sauce made from Indonesian sweet soy sauce (kecap manis) mixed with palm sugar (called gula jawa or "Javanese sugar" in Indonesia), garlic, deep fried shallots, peanut paste, petis (a kind of shrimp paste), candlenut, and salt. Chicken Madura satay is usually served in peanut sauce, while the mutton Madura satay is usually served in sweet soy sauce. Sate Madura uses smaller chunks of meat than other variants. It is eaten with rice or rice cakes wrapped in banana/coconut leaves (lontong/ketupat). Raw thinly sliced shallots and plain sambal are often served as condiments.
- Soto Madura: a turmeric-based beef and offal soup, served with boiled egg slices, and sambal.

=== Malang ===
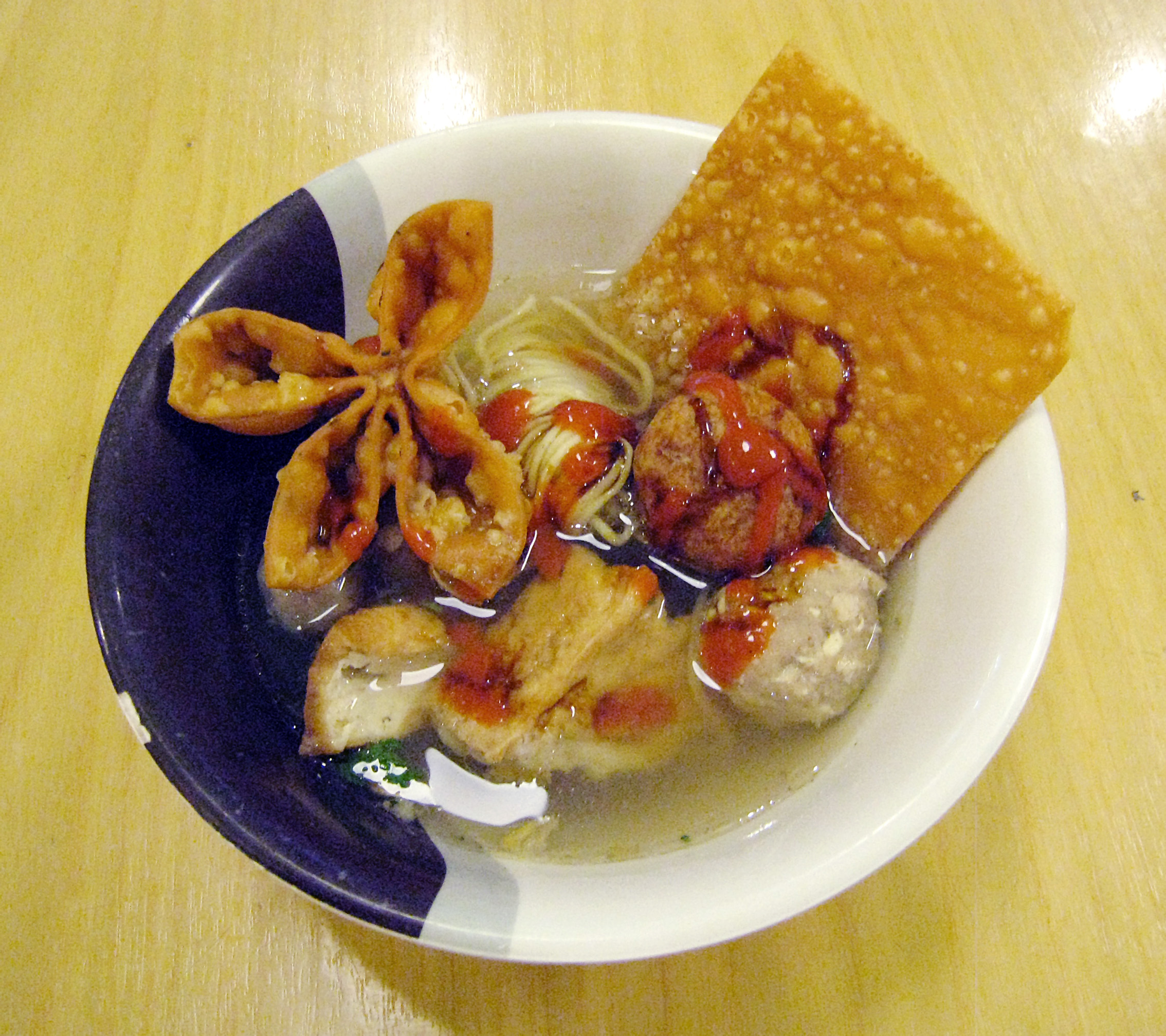
Bakso Malang, meatball and fried wonton soup from Malang, East Java. Sometimes also called bakwan Malang.

- Bakso Malang: bakso literally means meatball. Bakso Malang has more accompaniments, beside the meatball (mostly beef) itself. For example, offal, siomay dumplings (fried or steamed), tahu (tofu, fried or steamed, filled with meat), sound (mung bean threads), and yellow egg noodles. All of these are served in hot beef stock.
- Cwie mi: a Chinese-influenced noodle dish, containing boiled and seasoned noodles, topped with pre-cooked minced meat (usually pork or chicken) and boiled wonton. Similar to the Chinese zhajiang mian.

=== Banyuwangi ===
- Bolu klemben: cake with tortoise-like shape, made of mixture of flour, eggs, and sugar.
- Botok tawon: a type of botok that made from bee larvae.
- Pelasan, Osing-style of pepes food. The popular Osing pepes are pelasan teri, pelasan tahu and pelasan ayam.
- Pindang koyong: a fish cooked in yellow gravy-like soto with various spices.
- Rawon Banyuwangi: Banyuwangi-style of beef soup in dark gravy, served with mung bean sprouts and the ubiquitous sambal. The dark (almost black) color comes from the keluak nuts.
- Rujak soto: a unique blend of vegetable salad with soto, it can be soto daging (beef) or soto babat.
- Sale pisang: chips-like snack that made of bananas which are combed thin and then dried in the sun. After dried in the sun, it can be directly eaten or fried first.

=== Other East Javanese cuisine ===
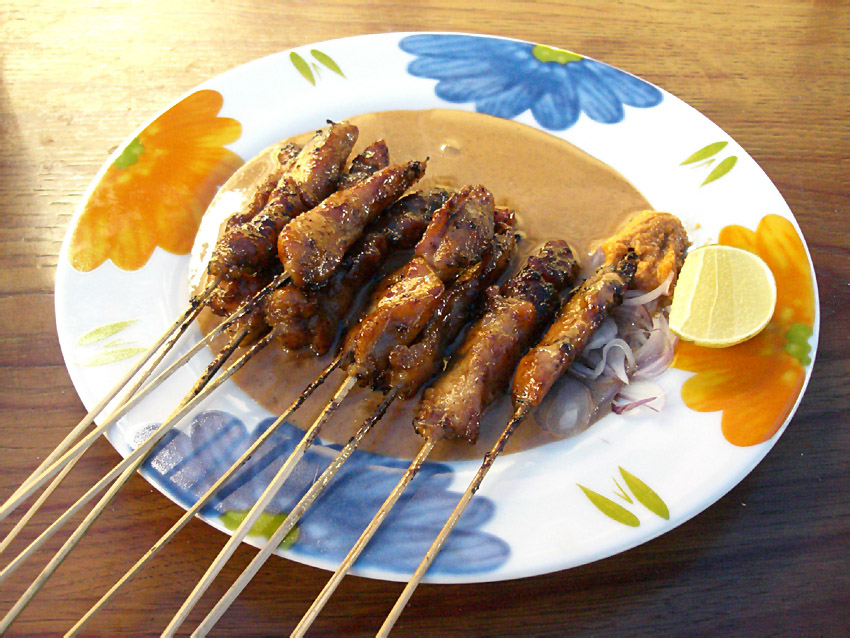
Sate Ponorogo

- Kare rajungan: curry dish cooked using portunidae.
- Lontong balap: literally means "racing rice cake", which is a dish of rice cakes, fried tofu, and beansprouts, doused in kecap manis and sambal sauce. In the past, lontong balap hawkers carried their wares in a large, heavy metal urn. The heaviness caused them to have to walk really quickly while carrying it, so they looked like they were "racing".
- Madumongso: a sweetmeat made from fermented black glutinous rice, cooked in coconut milk and sugar. It is sticky and very sweet, and comes wrapped in panties.
- Roti konde: a type of roti canai.
- Sate Ponorogo: a variant of satay originating in Ponorogo, a town in East Java. It is made from sliced marinated chicken, served with a sauce made of peanuts and chili, and garnished with shredded shallots, sambal, and lime juice. This variant is unique for the fact that each skewer contains one large piece of chicken, rather than several small cubes. The meat is marinated in spices and sweet soy sauce, in a process called "bacem" and is served with rice or lontong (rice cake). The grill is made from terracotta earthenware with a hole on one side to allow ventilation for the coals. After three months of use, the earthenware grill disintegrates and must be replaced.
- Tahu campur: a beef and offal soup, mixed with fresh vegetables, potatoes, rice cake, and tofu. The secret ingredient is the caramelized fermented shrimp paste (petis) which is mixed in just before serving.
- Tahu tek-tek: a dish containing cut-up fried tofu, boiled vegetables (mostly beansprouts), potatoes, drenched in a peanut-based sauce. The sauce has caramelized fermented shrimp paste (petis), chili, and garlic.

== Common Javanese dishes ==
Common Javanese dishes

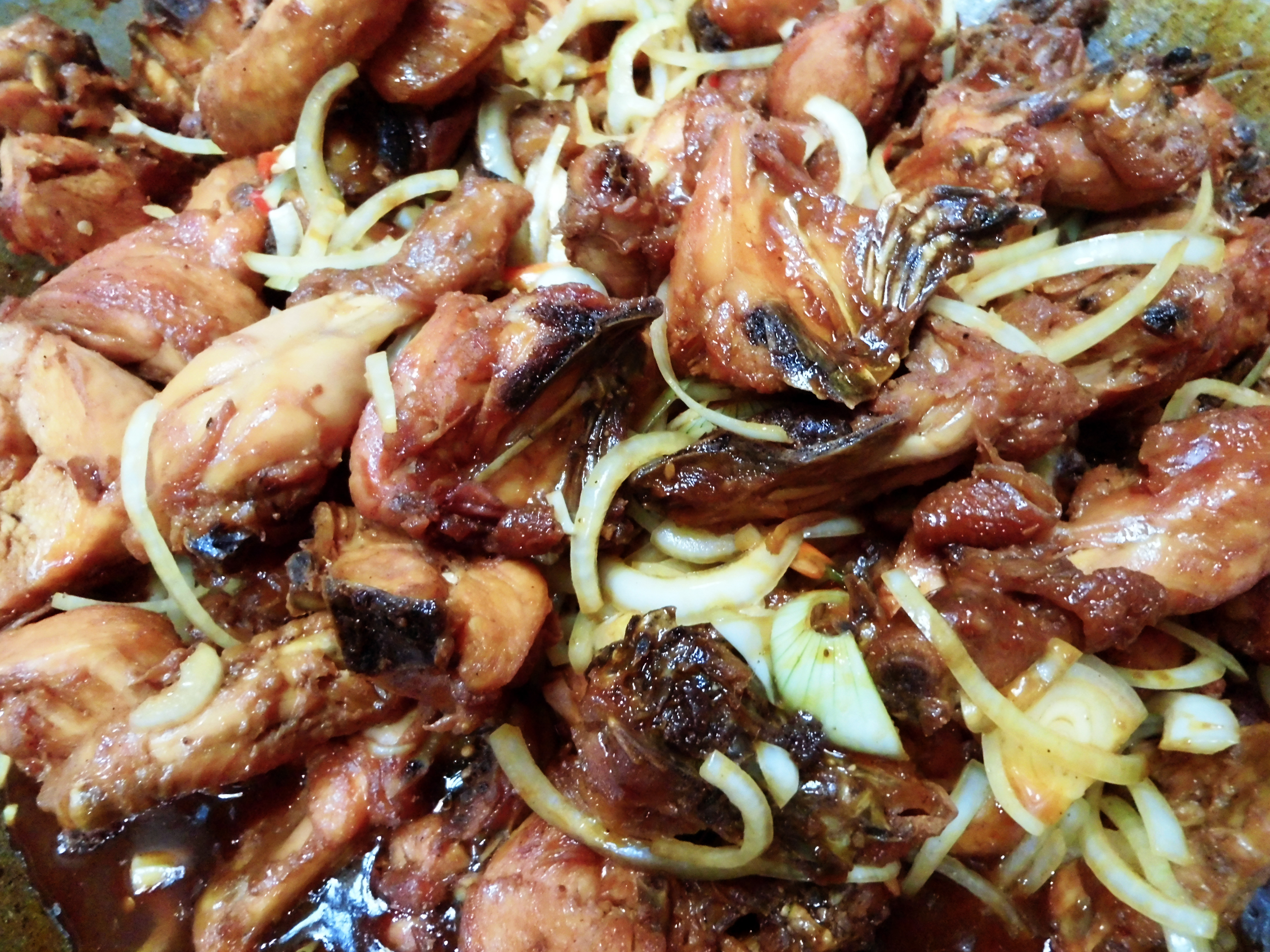
Ayam kecap

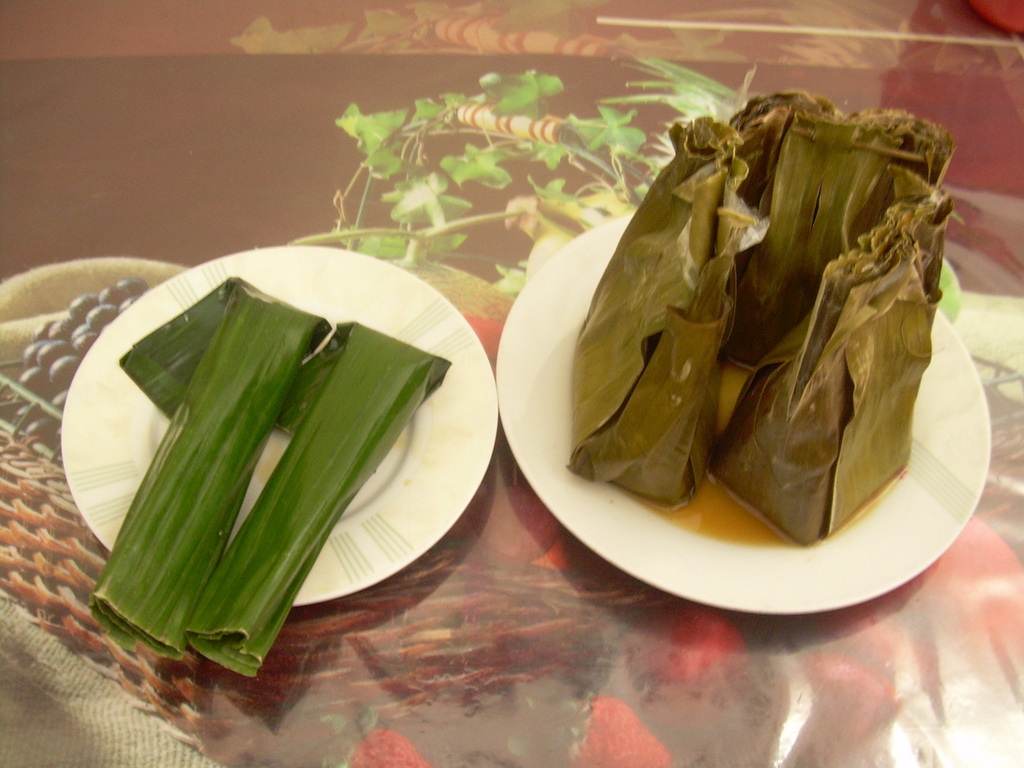
Botok

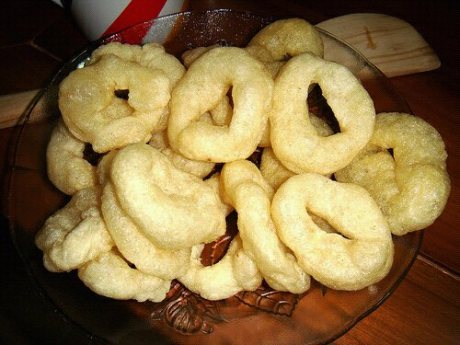
Donat jawa

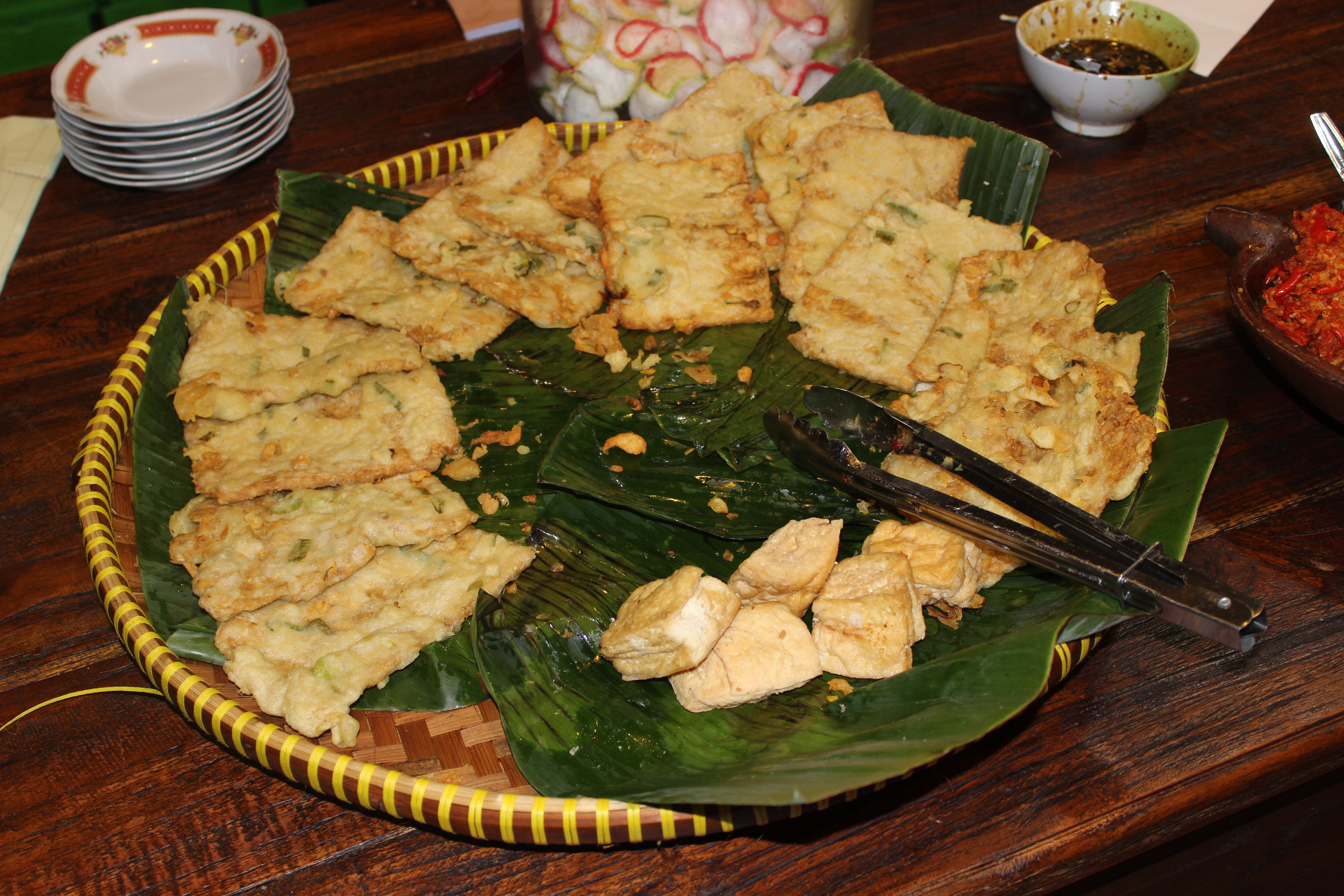
Gorengan

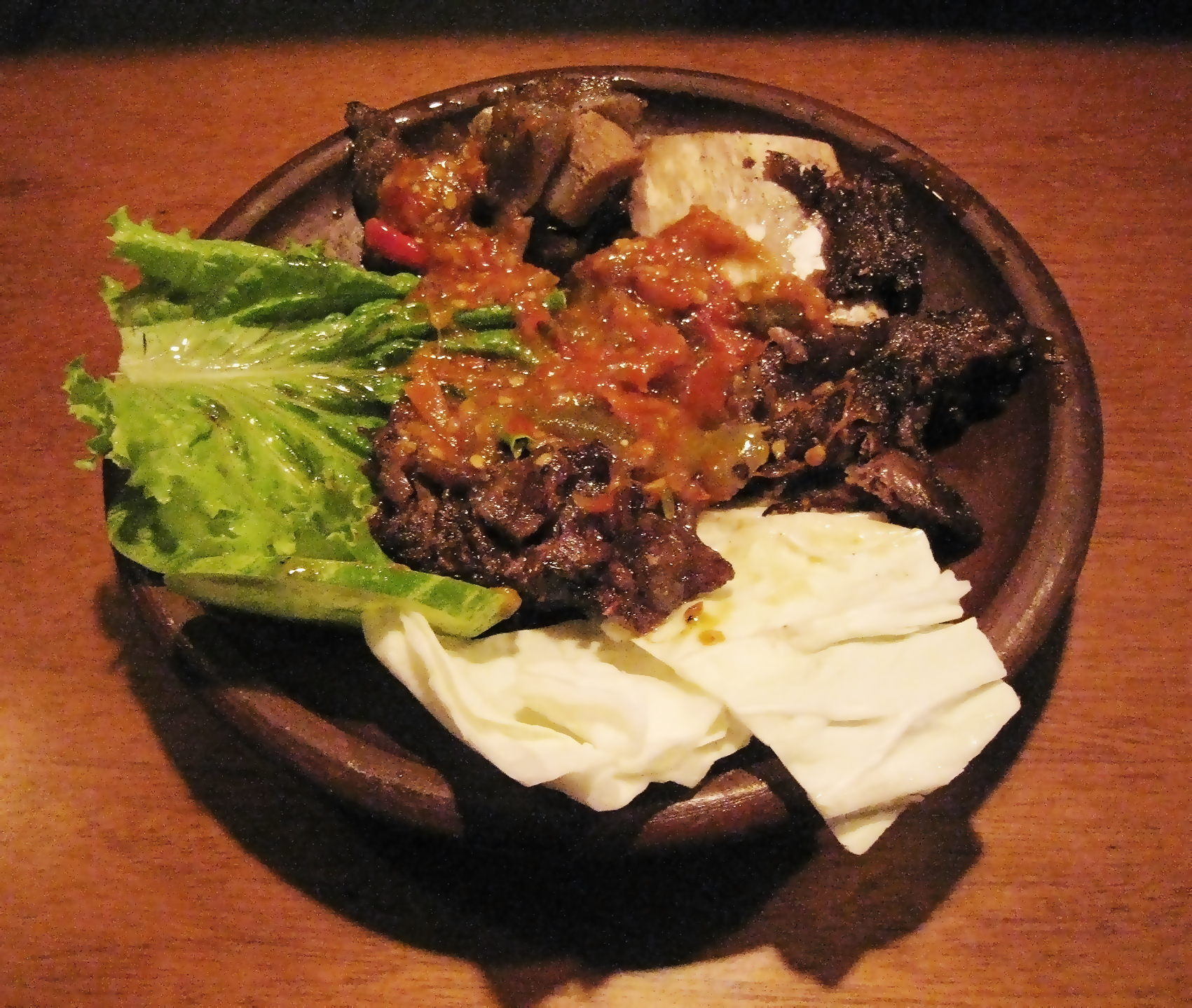
Iga penyet

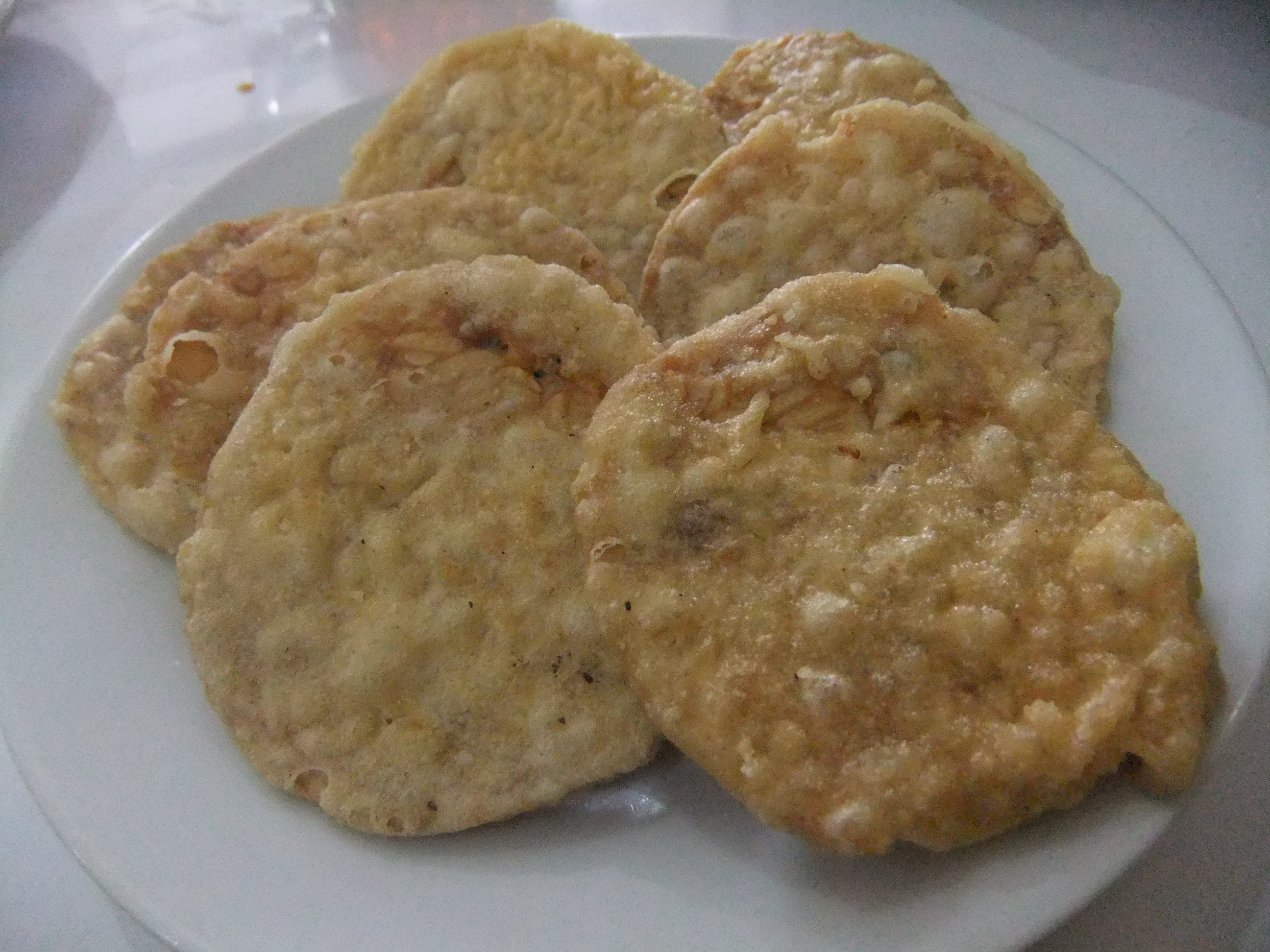
Keripik tempe

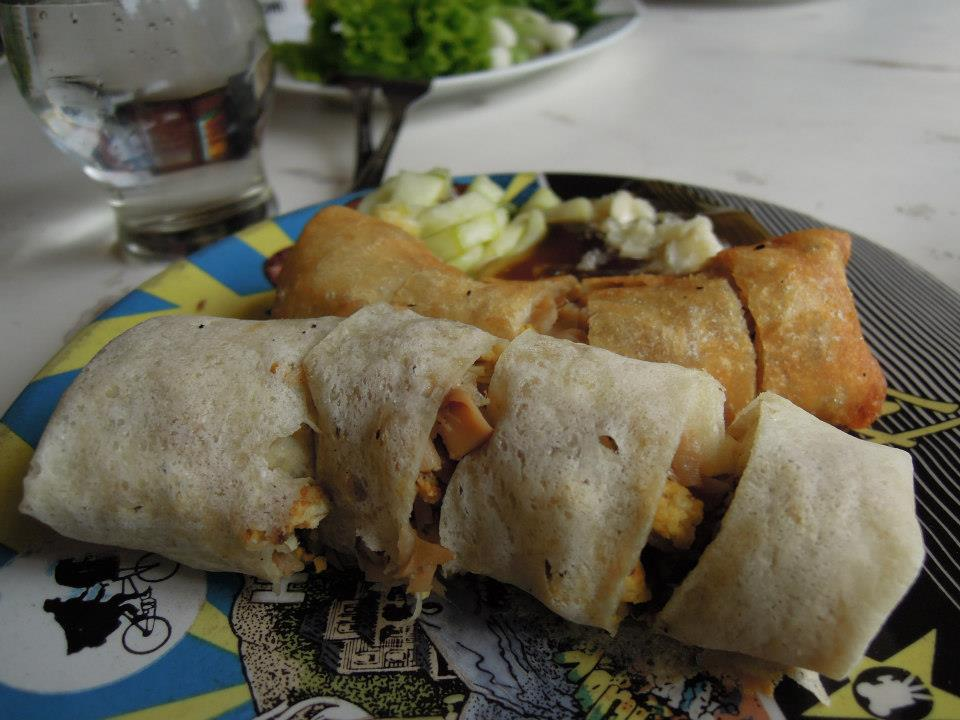
Lumpia

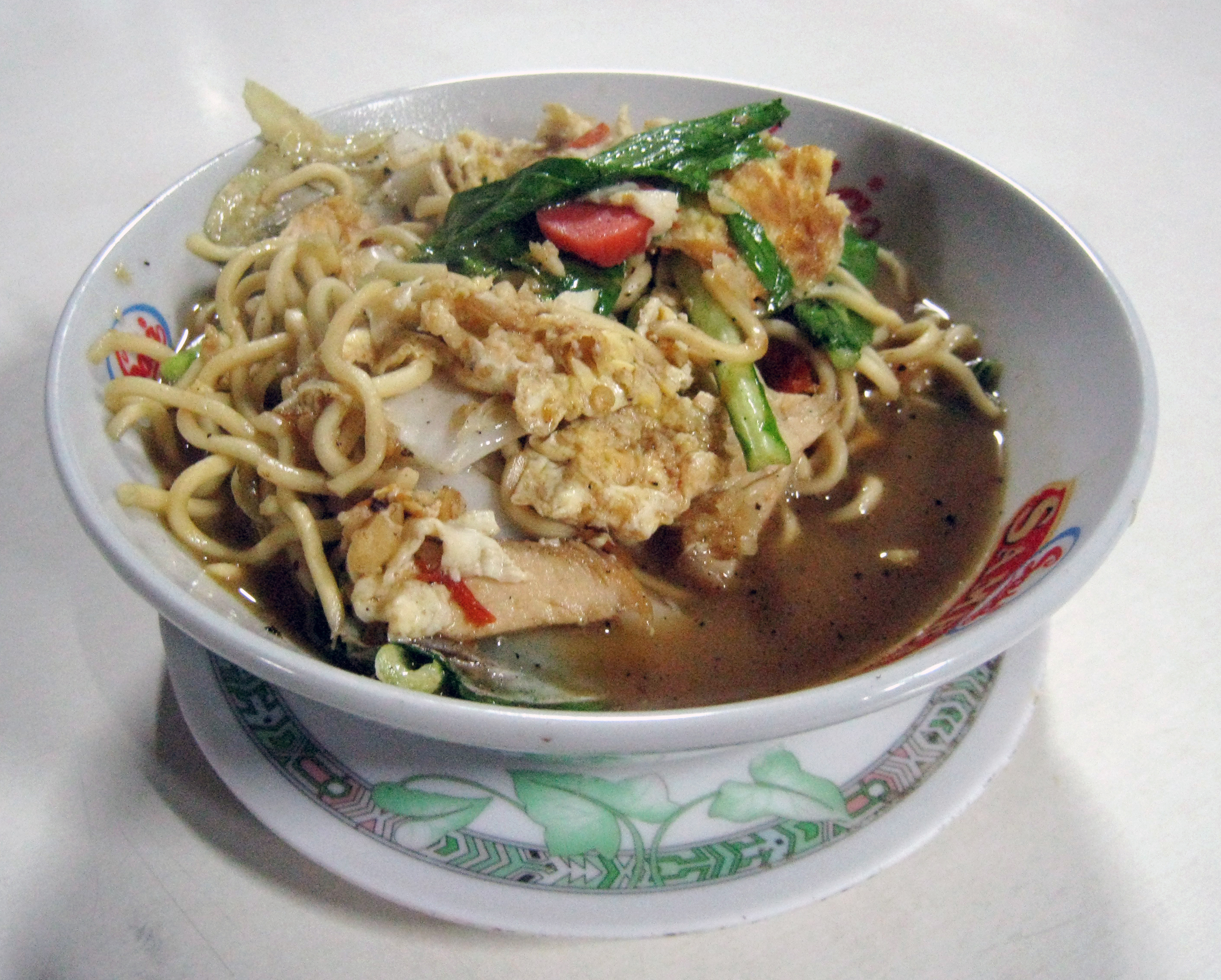
Mie rebus

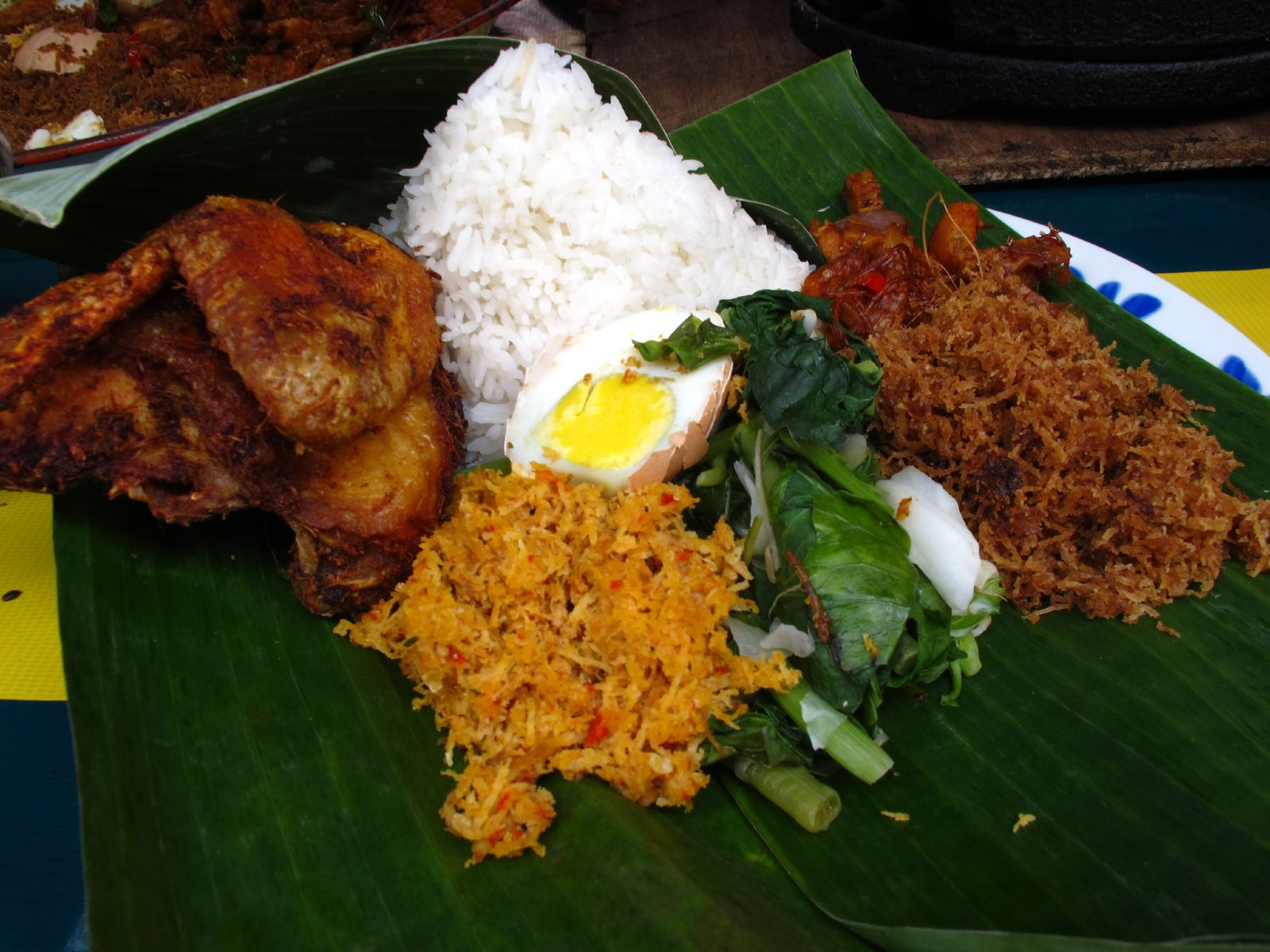
Nasi ambeng

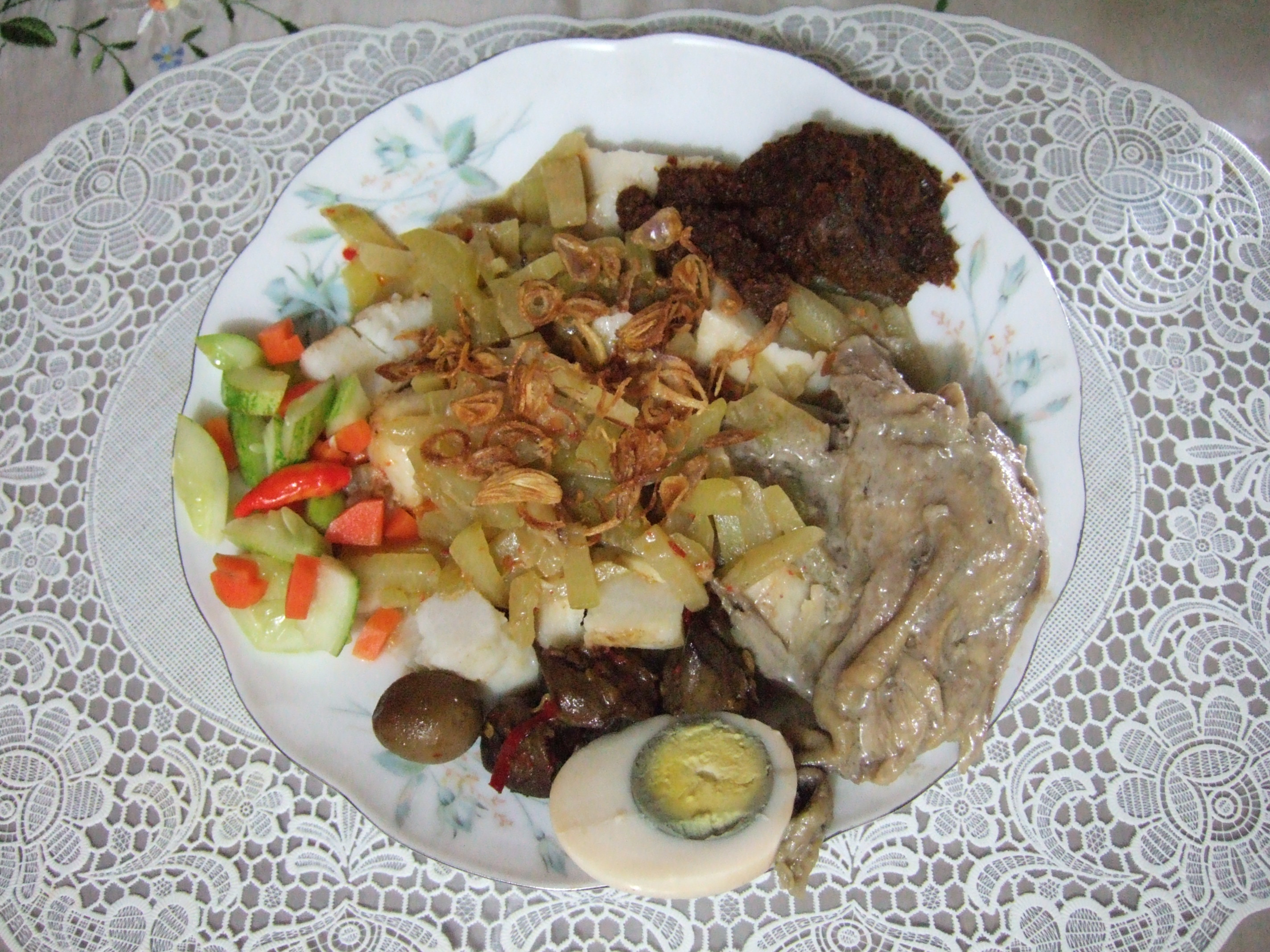
Nasi kari

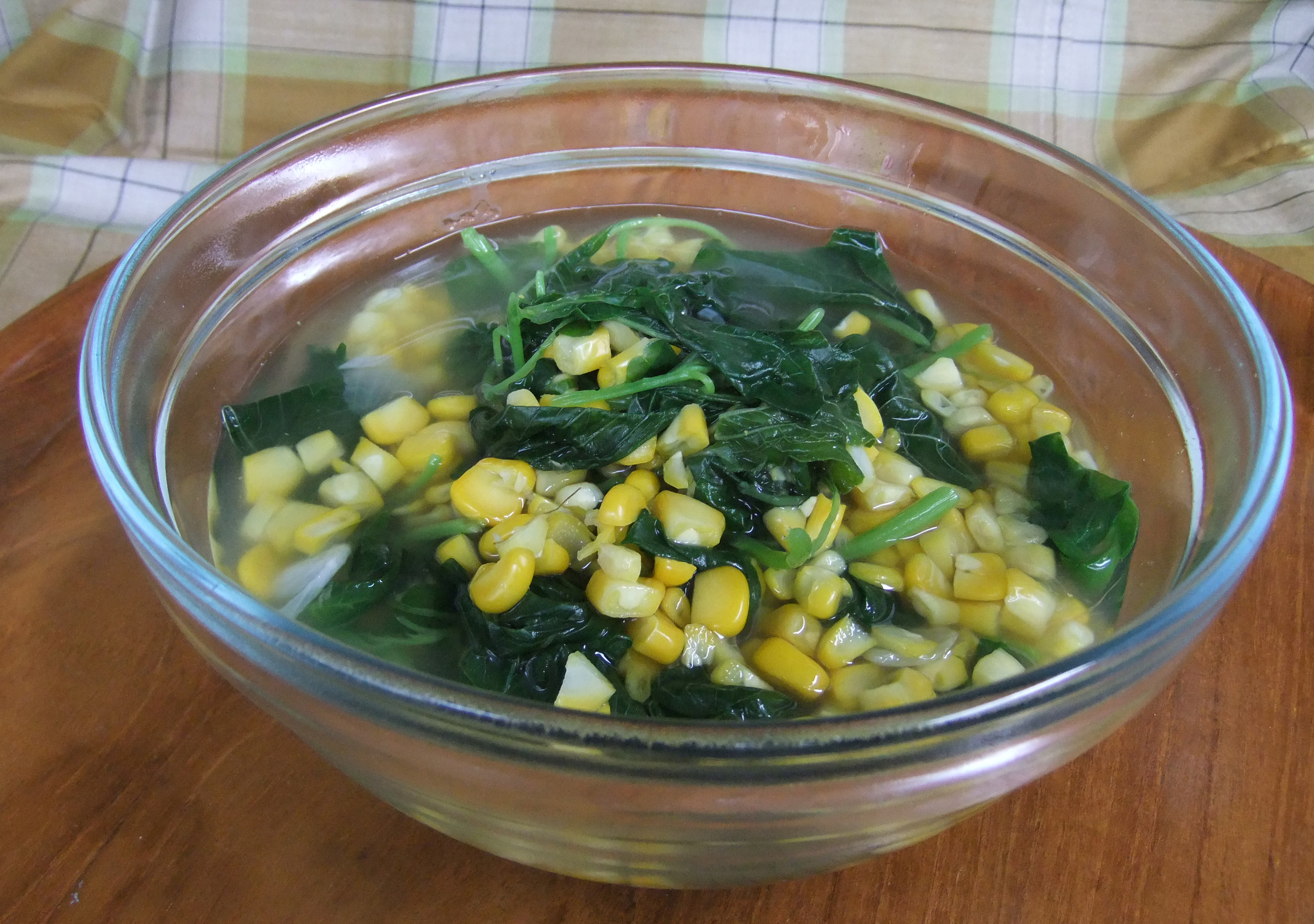
Sayur bening

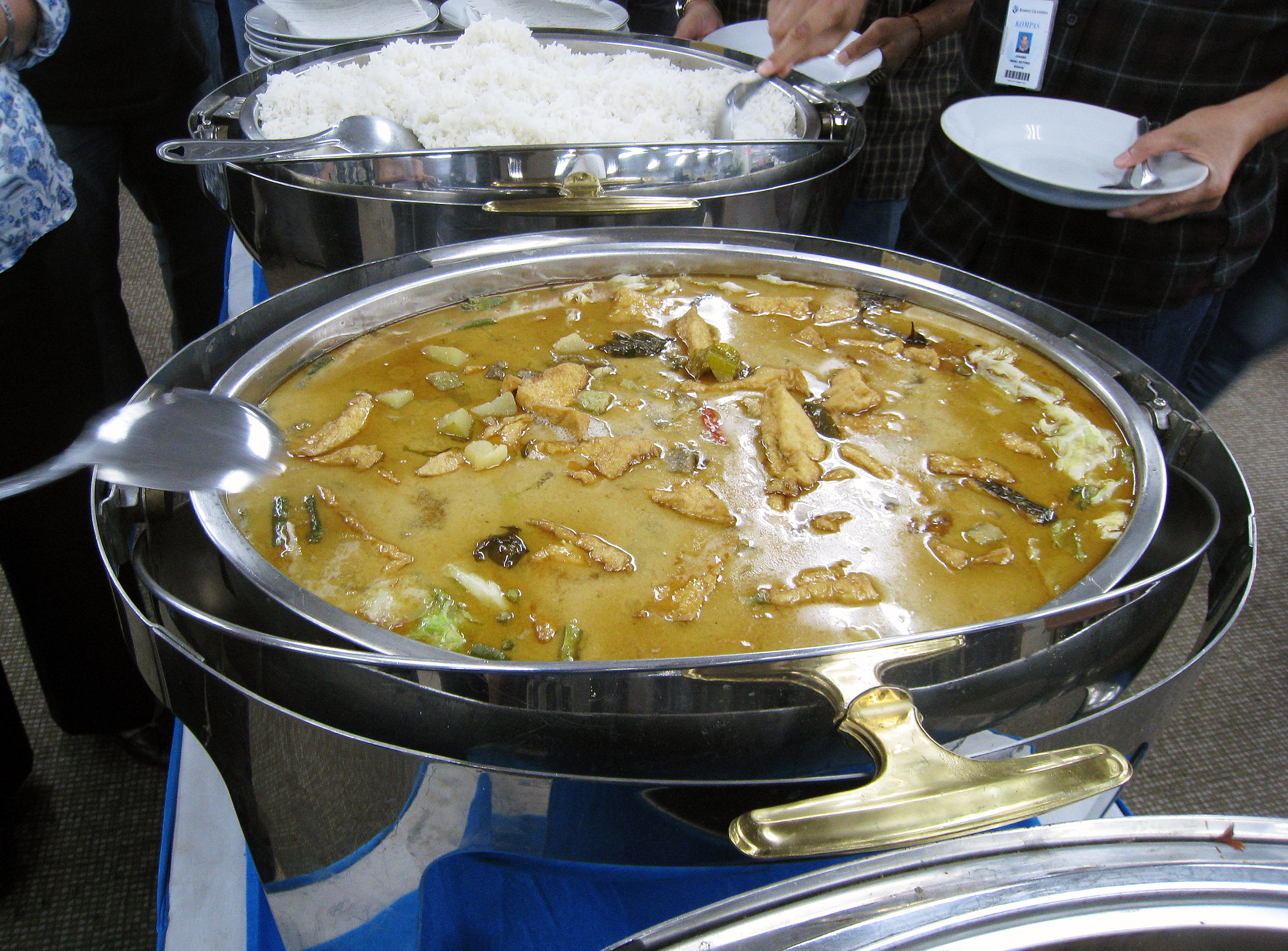
Sayur lodeh

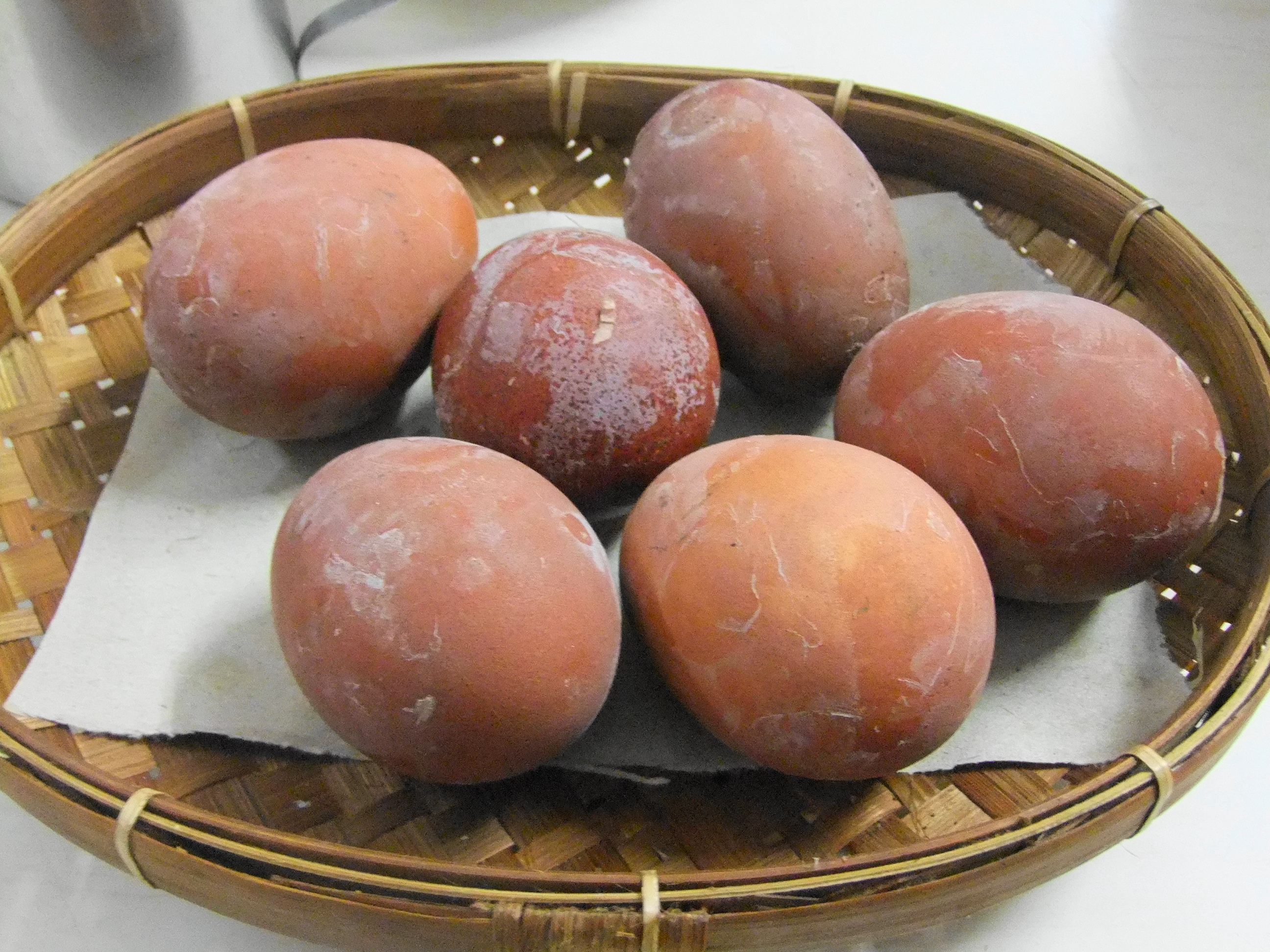
Telur pindang

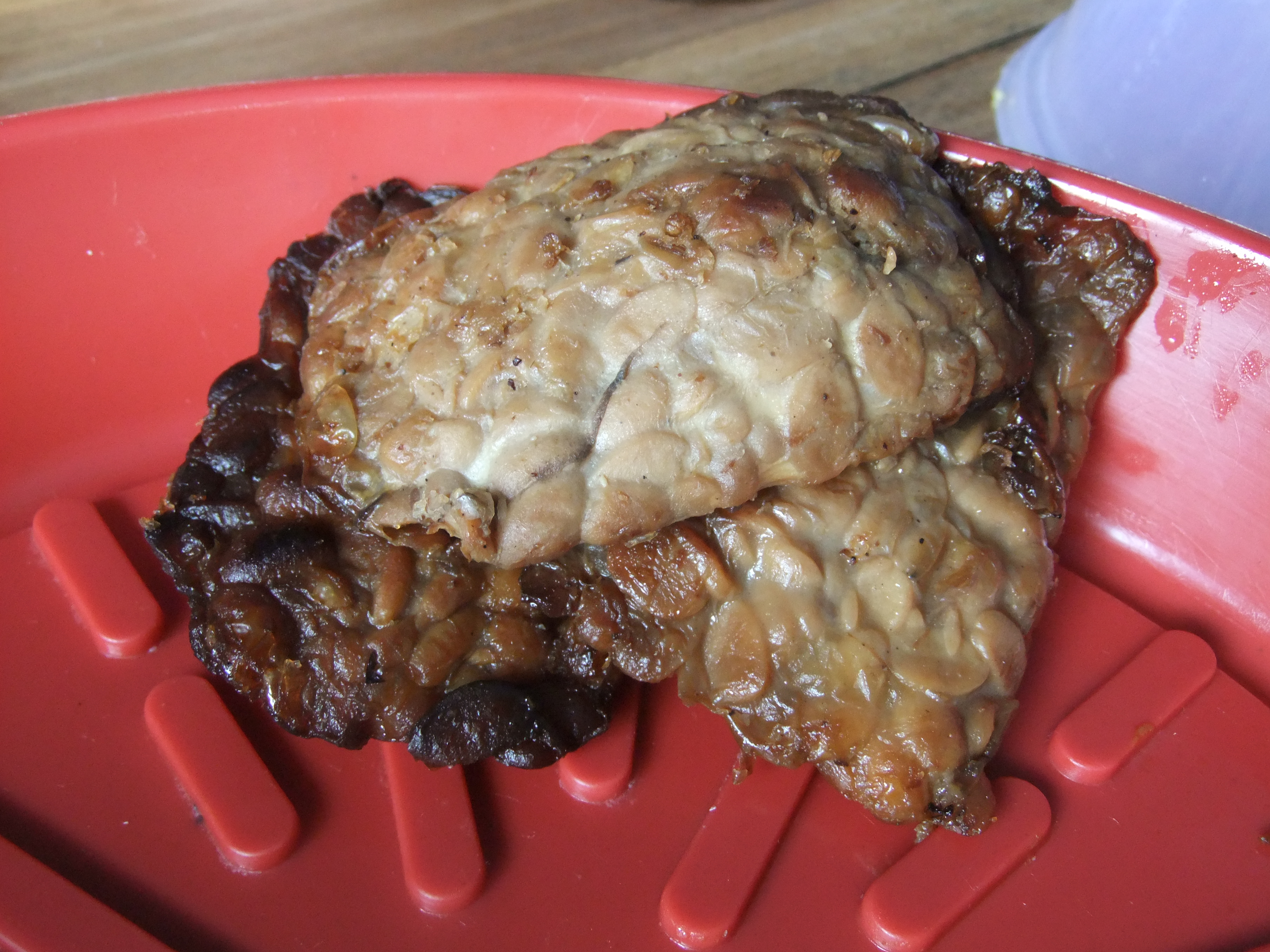
Tempeh bacem

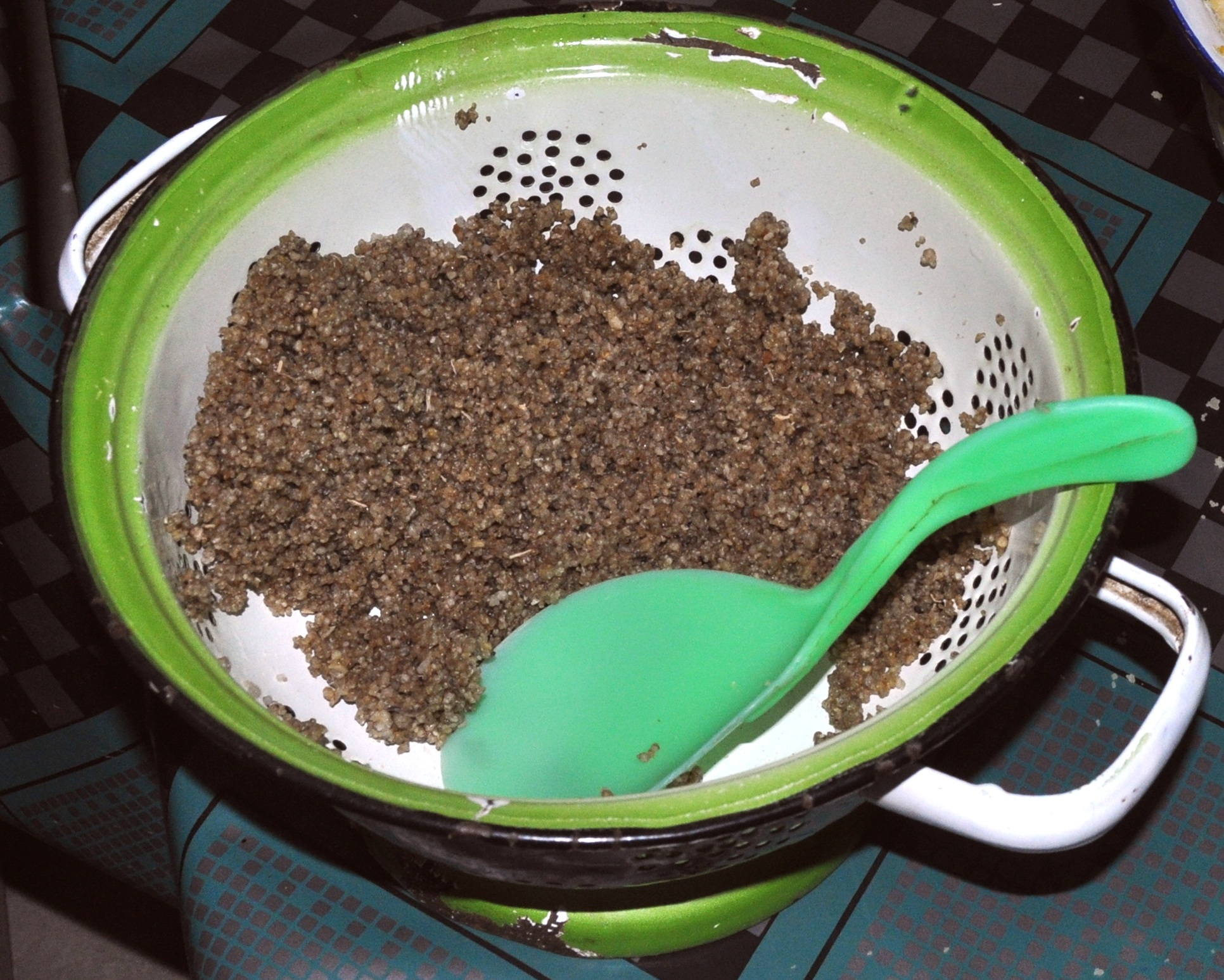
Tiwul

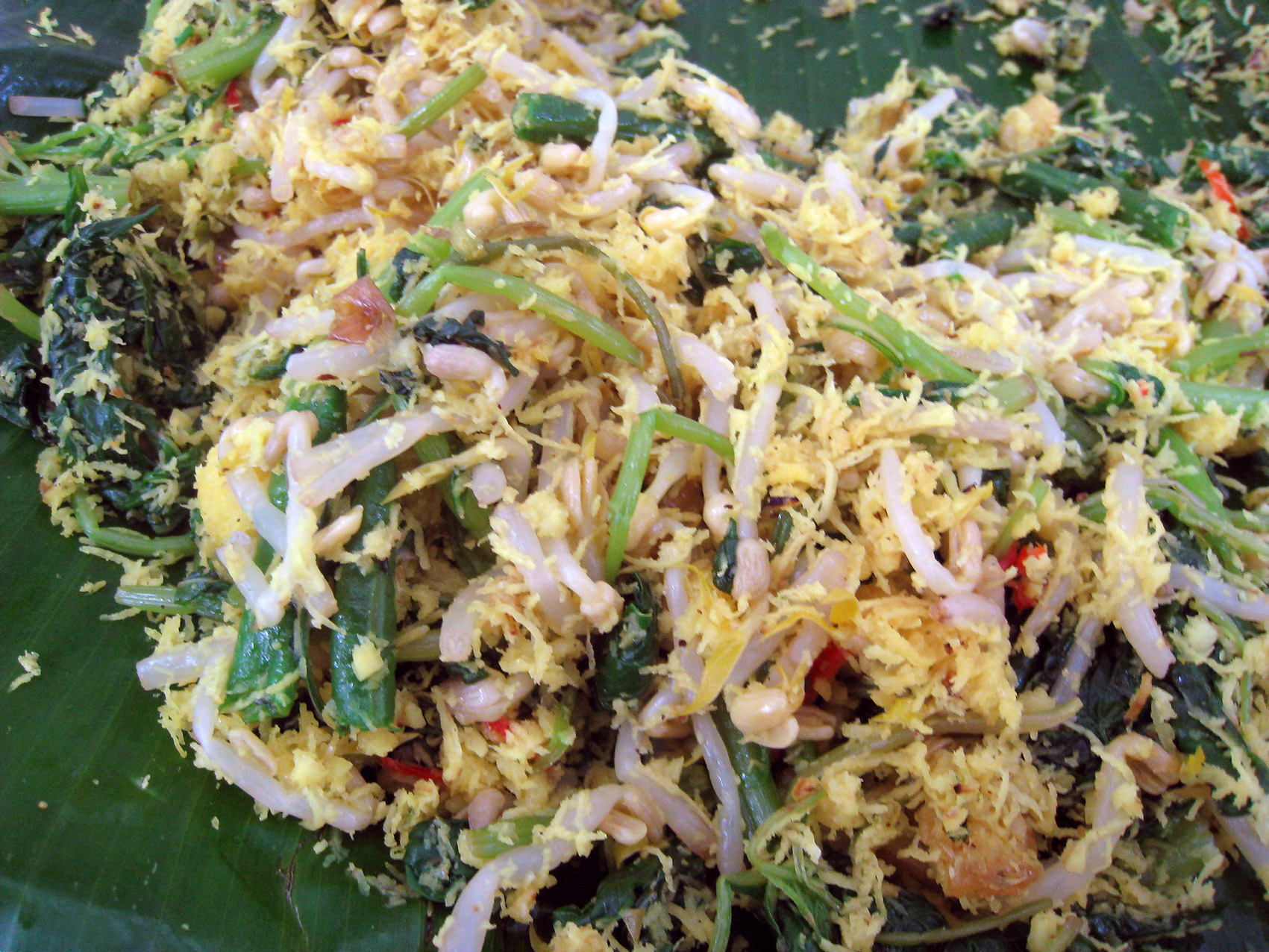
Urap sayur

These common Javanese dishes can be found throughout Java.

- Apem, traditional cake of steamed dough made of rice flour, coconut milk, yeast and palm sugar, usually served with grated coconut.
- Ayam bumbu rujak, chicken dish made from chicken meat which is still young and uses a red basic spice then grilled. A red base is a spice made from salt, garlic, onion, and red chili.
- Ayam goreng, fried chicken dish consisting of chicken deep fried in oil with various spices.
- Ayam kecap, chicken simmered or braised in sweet soy sauce.
- Bakmi jawa, wheat based noodle, generally prepared and topped with minced chicken seasoned in soy sauce, green vegetables and a bowl of broth.
- Bakso, bakso literally means meatball. Beef or chicken meatballs, usually served in a bowl of broth with yellow noodles, rice vermicelli, vegetables, tofu, green cabbage, bean sprout, sprinkled with fried shallots and celery.
- Bakwan, fried meal consisting of vegetables and batter. Bakwan usually refers to a vegetable fritter snack, commonly sold with gorengan.
- Bergedel, fried patties, made of ground potatoes, minced meat, peeled and ground corn or tofu, or minced fish.
- Bergedel jagung, corn fritters.
- Botok, a dish made from shredded coconut flesh which has been squeezed of its coconut milk, often mixed with other ingredients such as vegetable or fish, and wrapped in banana leaf and steamed.
- Brengkesan, fish, meat, tofu, anchovy or mushroom ingredients cooked inside a banana-leaf package.
- Bubur ayam, rice congee with shredded chicken meat served with some condiments and cake.
- Bubur kacang hijau, sweet dessert made from mung beans porridge with coconut milk and palm sugar or cane sugar. The beans are boiled till soft, and sugar and coconut milk are added.
- Bubur ketan hitam, sweet dessert made from black glutinous rice porridge with coconut milk and palm sugar or cane sugar. The black glutinous rice are boiled until soft, and sugar and coconut milk are added.
- Bubur sumsum, white congee made from rice flour and eaten with brown sugar sauce.
- Buntil, a traditional Javanese dish of scraped coconut meat mixed with anchovies and spices, wrapped in a papaya leaf, then boiled in coconut milk.
- Cah kangkung, stir fried water spinach.
- Dawet, an iced sweet dessert that contains droplets of green rice flour jelly, coconut milk and palm sugar syrup.
- Donat jawa, Javanese-style of ring-shaped fritter made from cassava with savoury taste.
- Garang asem, chicken dish cooked using banana leaves and dominated by sour and spicy flavor.
- Gorengan, assorted fritters such as tempeh, tofu, yam, sweet potato, cassava, and chopped vegetables.
- Gule, a type of soupy curry-like dishes that could be made from various ingredients; meats, fish or vegetables. The gule that popular in Javanese cuisine both are gule kambing (made of goat or mutton) and gule ayam (made of chicken).
  - Gule ayam, chicken cooked in a curry-like coconut milk soup.
  - Gule kambing, mutton cooked in a curry-like coconut milk soup.
- Iga penyet (lit. squeeze ribs), fried beef spare ribs served with spicy sambal terasi. The fried beef ribs is squeezed against a mortar filled with sambal, and usually served with lalab vegetables and steamed rice.
- Ikan asin, salted and sun-dried fishes of various species.
- Jenang, sweet toffee-like sugar palm-based confection, made from coconut milk, jaggery, and rice flour, and is sticky, thick, and sweet.
- Kare, the Javanese adaptation of curry dishes. Just like gulai, it could be made from various ingredients; meats or vegetables.
- Klepon, glutinous rice balls stuffed with palm sugar, colored green using pandanus leaf, and rolled in fresh grated coconut.
- Keripik tempe, tempeh chips, made from thinly sliced, lightly battered, then deep fried tempeh (soybean cake).
- Kupat, rice dumpling made from rice packed inside a diamond-shaped container of woven palm leaf pouch.
- Kwetiau ayam, boiled flat noodle with diced chicken.
- Kwetiau goreng, stir fried flat noodle dish.
- Lepet, sticky rice dumpling mixed with peanuts cooked with coconut milk and packed inside a janur (young coconut leaf) or palm leaf.
- Lontong, pressed rice cake inside banana wrapping.
- Lumpia, spring roll made of thin paper-like or crepe-like pastry skin called "lumpia wrapper" enveloping savory or sweet fillings.
- Lotek, almost identical to gado-gado, but sweeter. It is similar to pecel, but includes different vegetables as well as boiled egg slices and a garnish of fish or shrimp crackers and emping (Gnetum gnemon L. nut, flattened, dried, and fried into small thin crackers).
- Martabak, stuffed pancake or pan-fried bread, sometimes filled with beef and scallions. Usually served with sambals and acar.
- Mie ayam, chicken bakmi dish of seasoned yellow wheat noodles topped with diced chicken meat.
- Mie bakso, bakso served with yellow noodles and rice vermicelli
- Mie goreng, spicy fried noodle dish seasoned in sweet soy sauce. The popular one is mie goreng jawa.
- Mie pangsit, noodle soup dish served with soft-boiled wonton.
- Mie rebus, famous noodle dish which consists of noodles, salt and egg, served with a tangy, spicy and sweet potato-based sauce.
- Nasi ambeng, fragrant Javanese rice dish that consists of steamed white rice, chicken curry or chicken stewed in soy sauce, beef or chicken rendang, fried sambal, urap, bergedel, and serundeng.
- Nasi goreng (lit. fried rice), Javanese-style of Indonesian fried rice.
  - Nasi goreng jawa, fried rice dish uses sambal ulek as seasoning and has a spicy taste.
- Nasi kare (lit. curry rice), curry rice dish consists of steamed white rice, lontong or ketupat, curry, acar, fried shallots and sambals.
- Nasi kuning, similar to nasi rames or nasi campur, but the rice is cooked in coconut milk and colored bright yellow using turmeric and scented with lemongrass and kaffir lime leaves.
- Nasi rames, rice with accompaniments, usually some curried vegetable stew (sayur lodeh), a selection of cooked fish or chicken or meat and offal pieces, and a dollop of spicy sambal.
- Pangsit, wonton filled with vegetables, chicken or shrimp. It can be dry or wet.
- Pecel, a type of peanut sauce with chili is a common ingredients in Javanese cuisine. It is used in various type of rujak and gado-gado. It can also be used as stand alone sauce with rice and prawn, egg and vegetables as nasi pecel (pecel rice).
- Petis, black-colored shrimp paste.
- Putu, traditional cylindrical-shaped and green-colored steamed cake, made of rice flour called suji and colored green with extract acquired from pandan leaf, filled with palm sugar, and steamed in bamboo tubes, hence its name, and served with grated coconut.
- Puyonghai, omelette dish made from the mixture of vegetables such as carrots, bean sprouts, and cabbages, mixed with meats such as crab meat, shrimp, or minced chicken.
- Rempeyek, deep-fried savoury Javanese cracker made from flour (usually rice flour) with other ingredients, bound or coated by crispy flour batter. The most common type of rempeyek is peanut peyek.
- Rengginang, thick rice cracker, made from cooked glutinous sticky rice and seasoned with spices, made into a flat and rounded shape, and then sun-dried. The sun-dried rengginang is deep fried with ample cooking oil to produce a crispy rice cracker.
- Roti bakar (lit. grilled bread), Javanese-style of toast sandwich consisting of two slice of breads and the filling, usually hagelslag or jam.
- Rujak, traditional fruit and vegetable salad dish. There are many kinds of rujak.
- Sambal, chili sauce or paste typically made from a mixture of a variety of chili peppers with secondary ingredients such as shrimp paste, garlic, ginger, shallot, scallion, palm sugar, and lime juice. Sambal has many various types.
- Satay, skewered grilled meat is a common dish in Java. The Javanese variants are sate Tegal, sate Ambal, sate Solo, sate buntel, sate Madura, sate Ponorogo, etc.
- Sayur bening, spinach and maize in clear soup flavoured with temu kunci.
- Sayur lodeh, assorted vegetables, stewed in coconut milk.
- Semur jawa, meat (mainly beef or chicken) or vegetable (mainly potato or eggplant) stew, that is braised in thick brown gravy. The main ingredient used in semur gravy is sweet soy sauce, shallots, onions, garlic, ginger, candlenut, nutmeg and cloves, sometimes pepper, coriander, cumin and cinnamon might be added.
- Serabi, rice pancake that is made from rice flour with coconut milk or shredded coconut as an emulsifier.
- Sop buntut, oxtail soup.
- Soto, this Indonesian soup dish is also a common dish in Java. The Javanese variants are common soto ayam and soto babat (tripe), soto Kudus, soto Madura, soto Lamongan, etc.
- Tahu, fermented soy food basically a soy milk cheese. It can be fried, stir fried, stewed, as soup ingredient, even also for sweets.
- Tahu goreng, deep fried tofu prepared with some condiments, such as shrimp paste, sambal, fried shallots, mayonnaise or soy sauce.
- Tapai, traditional fermented preparation of rice or other starchy foods.
- Telur pindang, marbled eggs boiled with herbs and spices.
- Tempeh, a meat substitute made from soy bean fermented with mold. It is a staple source of protein in Java and popular in the world as an excellent meat substitute for vegetarians.
  - Tempe bacem, tempeh that stewed in coconut sugar and spices, then deep-fried. It has sweet and savoury flavour.
  - Tempeh burger, hamburger with tempeh as main ingredient, a Javanese fusion dish.
  - Tempe penyet, fried tempeh mixed with sambal chili paste in a mortar and pestle. Usually served in addition to other penyet dishes, such as ayam penyet (chicken) or iga penyet (ribs).
- Terang bulan, bread like puff with sugar, corn, and coarse nut in the middle.
- Tiwul, boiled rice substitution made from dried cassava.
- Tumis sayuran, stir-fried vegetables, usually mixed with chili and a spice paste.
- Tumpeng, a rice served in the shape of a conical volcano, usually with rice colored yellow using turmeric. It is an important part of ceremony in Java. Tumpeng served in important events such as birthday, moving house, or other ceremonies. Traditionally, tumpeng is served alongside fried chicken, boiled egg, vegetables, and goat meat on a round plate made from bamboo called besek.
- Untir-untir, dough twist that is fried in peanut oil. It has a shiny and golden look with crispy taste.
- Urap sayur, vegetables in spiced grated coconut dressing.
- Jajan pasar, several types of shaped and colored flour, rice flour, and glutinous rice flour cakes, sprinkled with desiccated coconut and drizzled with melted palm sugar. Jajan literally means snack, and pasar means market, as this snack is usually found in traditional markets.

== Javanese beverages ==
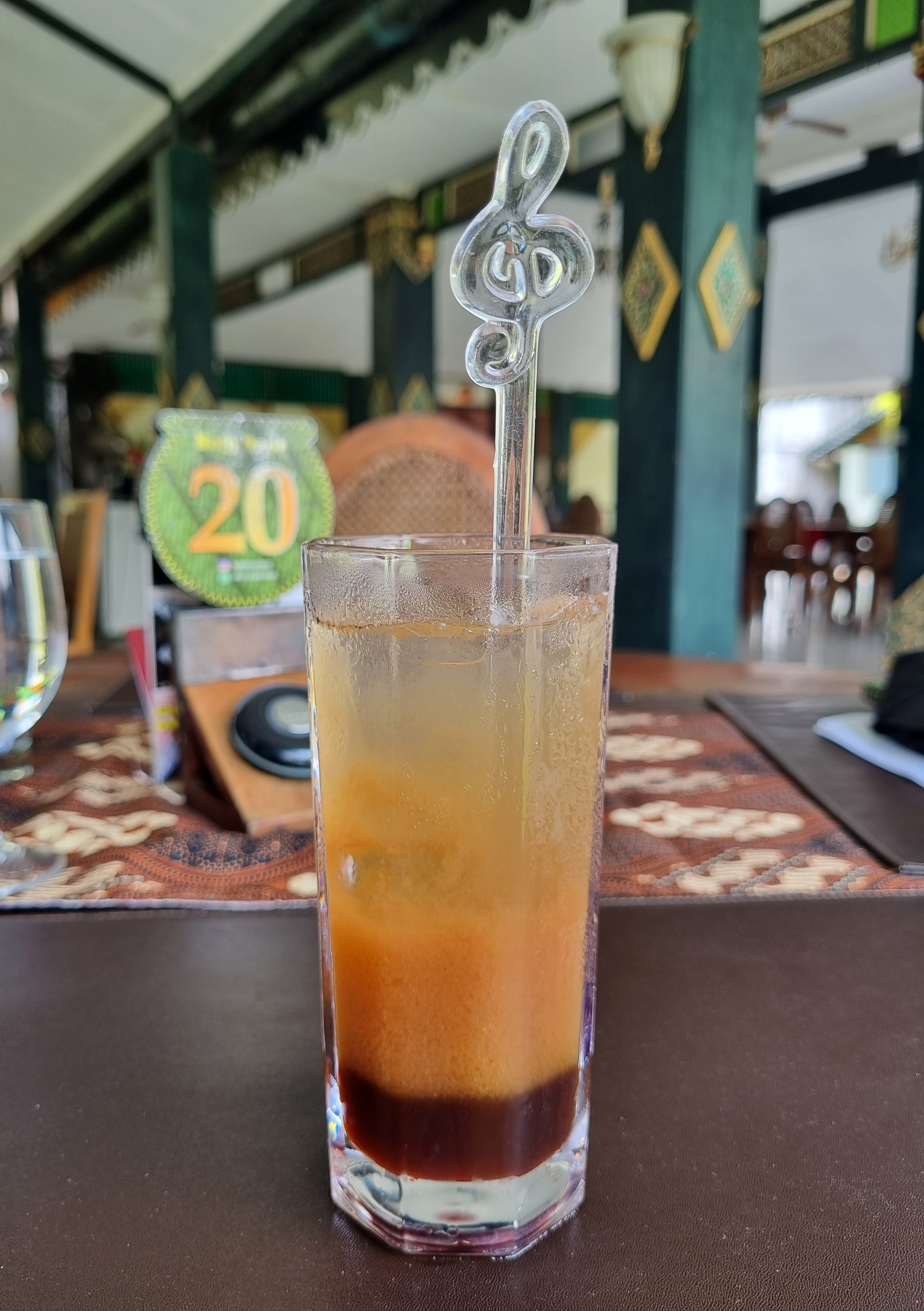
Es asem jawa, Javanese tamarind juice

- Dawet, green rice flour jellies served with gula jawa (palm sugar), santen (coconut milk) and ice.
- Es asem or gula asem, tamarind juice with gula jawa (palm sugar) and ice.
- Teh poci Tegal: tea brewed in a clay teapot, served with rock sugar. Tegal, a Central Java town, is a major producer of high-quality tea.
- Wedhang ronde (ronde): a hot Javanese dessert of glutinous rice balls stuffed with peanut paste, floating in a hot and sweet ginger and lemongrass tea.
- Wedhang angsle (angsle): a hot soupy dessert of sago pearls, pre-cooked glutinous rice and mung beans, putu mayang (brightly colored, noodle-shaped flour cakes), and fried peanuts, covered in hot and sweet coconut milk.
- Wedhang uwuh (uwuh) (id): a hot Javanese clove drink.

== See also ==
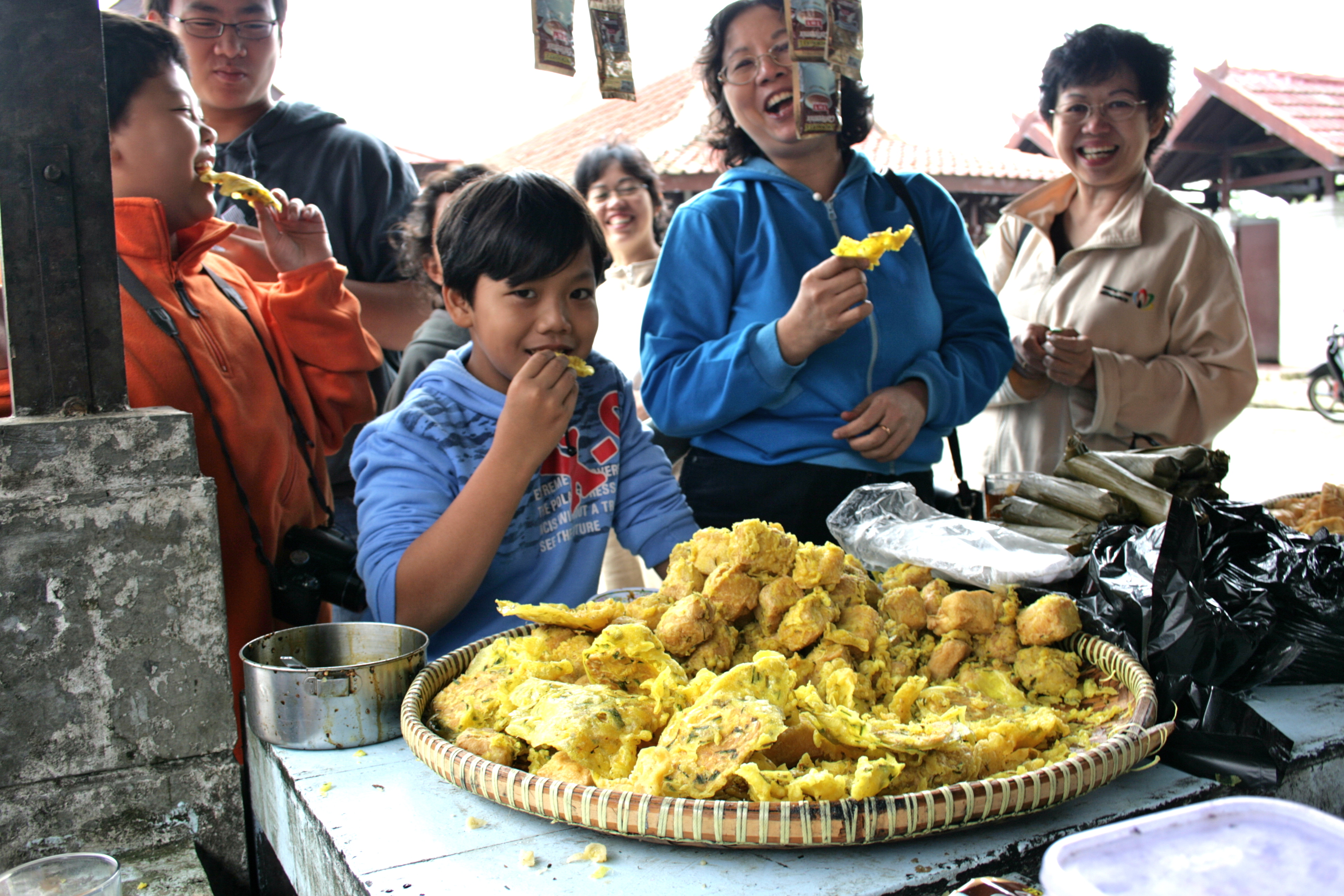
Gorengan ('fried snacks') in a market at Dieng Plateau, Central Java.

- Indonesian cuisine
- Sundanese cuisine
- Madurese cuisine
- List of Indonesian dishes
