= Indonesian noodles =

Indonesian dish

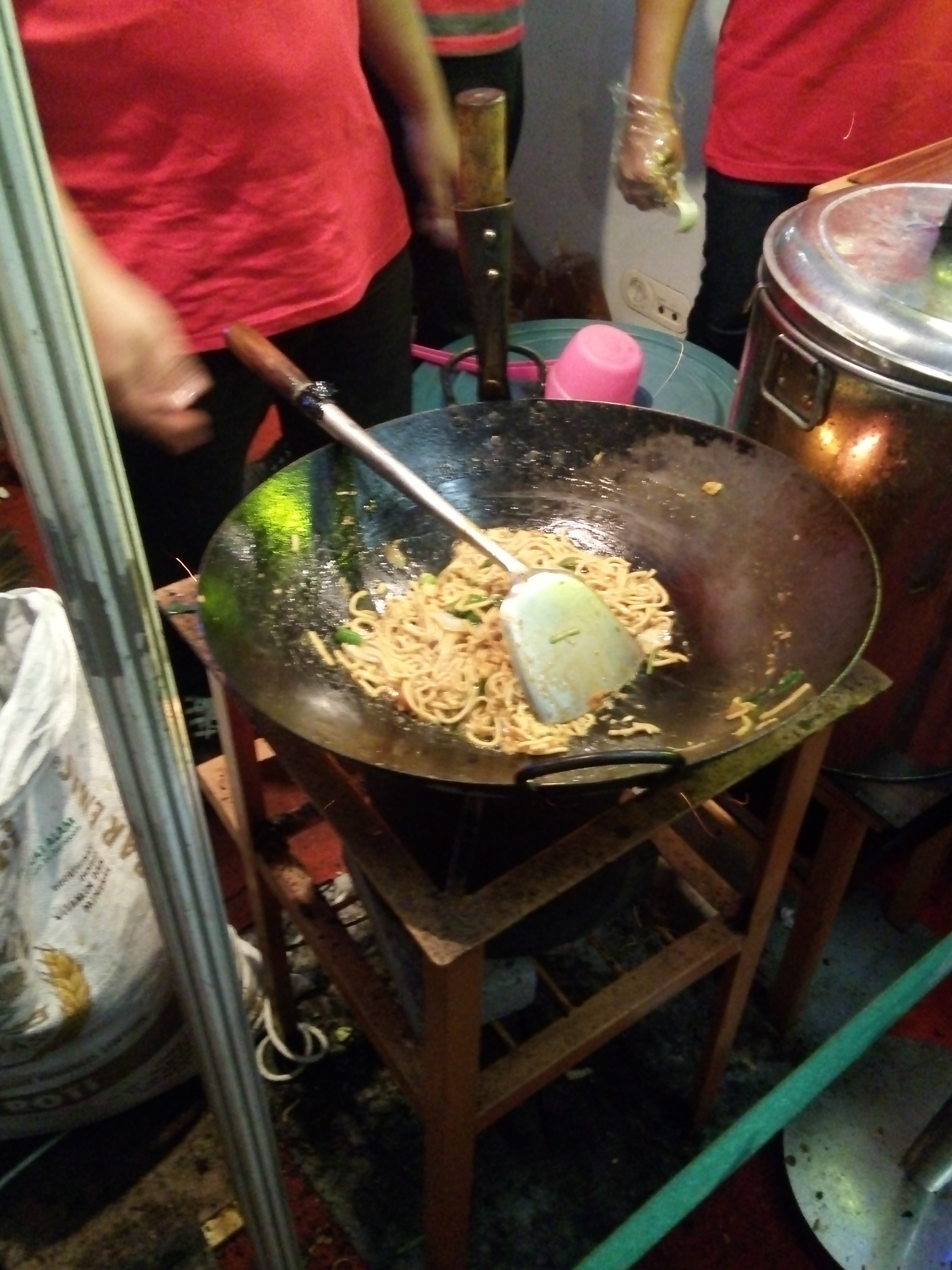
- Stir-frying mie goreng jawa in a wok
- Type: Noodle
- Place of origin: Indonesia
- Region or state: Indonesia and the Netherlands
- Variations: Various

Indonesian noodles are a significant aspect of Indonesian cuisine which is itself very diverse. Indonesian cuisine recognizes many types of noodles, with each region of the country often developing its own distinct recipes.

== History ==
Chinese influences are evident in Indonesian food, with the adoption of various Chinese noodles that developed within Chinese Indonesian cuisine such as bakmi, mie ayam and kwetiau goreng. Indonesian noodles originated from Chinese influence that resulted from the immigration of Chinese settlers to the Indonesian archipelago.

According to Denys Lombard in the book Le carrefour Javanais. Essai d'histoire globale II (The Javanese Crossroads: Towards a Global History, 2005), the consumption of noodles on the island of Java is thought to have existed since the Majapahit era. Starting from the word hanglaksa which was found in the Biluluk inscription dated from 1391. Hanglaksa in Kawi means "vermicelli maker". In Sanskrit, laksa means "one hundred thousand", referring to numerous strands of the vermicelli. The term laksa or lakhshah is also believed to have come from Persian or Hindi which refer to a kind of vermicelli.

Nevertheless, some of these noodles such as mie goreng, have been completely assimilated into mainstream Indonesian cuisine. Due to the great diversity in Indonesian cuisine, noodles too have undergone diversification and changed according to local tastes, influences, and available ingredients – from mie Aceh, Palembang mie celor, to Javanese mie Jawa. Some types of noodles, such as bihun or rice vermicelli had become integrated as ingredients into Indonesian soto ayam.

Consumption of noodles in Indonesia reached a new height after the advent of the Indonesian instant noodle industry back in the 1970s. Since then, Indonesia has become one of the world's major producers and consumers of instant noodles. Indonesia is the world's second largest instant noodle market coming only after China, with demand reaching 12.52 billion servings in 2019. Today, instant noodles have become a staple in Indonesian households. Certain brands such as Indomie have become household names, and have risen to become a global instant noodle brands.

== Noodle types ==
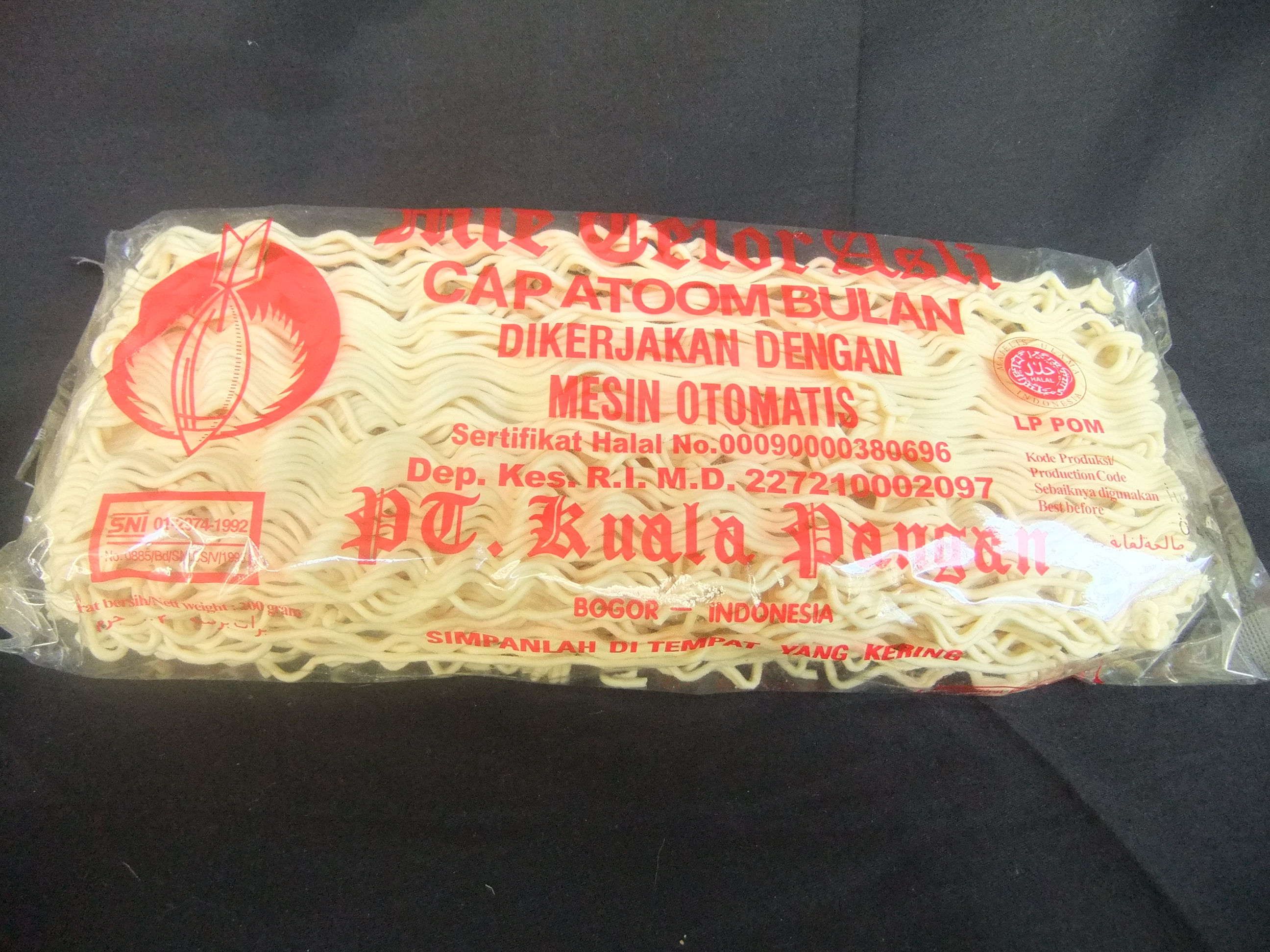
Indonesian mie telur or yellow wheat and egg noodles, main ingredient for various Indonesian noodle dishes

- Bakmi – yellow wheat noodles with egg and meat.
- Bihun – rice vermicelli, thin form of rice noodles.
- Cirambay – Sundanese flat noodle made of tapioca.
- Kwetiau – flat or thick rice noodles made of rice.
- Locupan – white semi-transparent noodles made of rice flour.
- Makaroni – dry pasta shaped like narrow tubes.
- Mie instan – instant noodle.
- Mie golosor – noodle made of tapioca and turmeric.
- Mie jagung – noodles made of corn starch.
- Mie kenyol – Javanese dried noodle made of tapioca.
- Mie lethek – thin noodle made of gaplek.
- Mie sagu – noodles made of sagu.
- Mie singkong/mocaf – noodles made of cassava.
- Misoa – very thin variety of salted noodles made from wheat flour.
- Mie tarik – (lit. pulled noodles) soft wheat flour noodles.
- Mie telur – egg noodles.
- Sohun – transparent noodle made from starch—it can be mung bean starch, potato starch, sweet potato starch, tapioca, arrowroot or canna starch—and water. In Klaten, sound made from aren starch.

== Notable noodle dishes ==
Indonesian noodle dishes

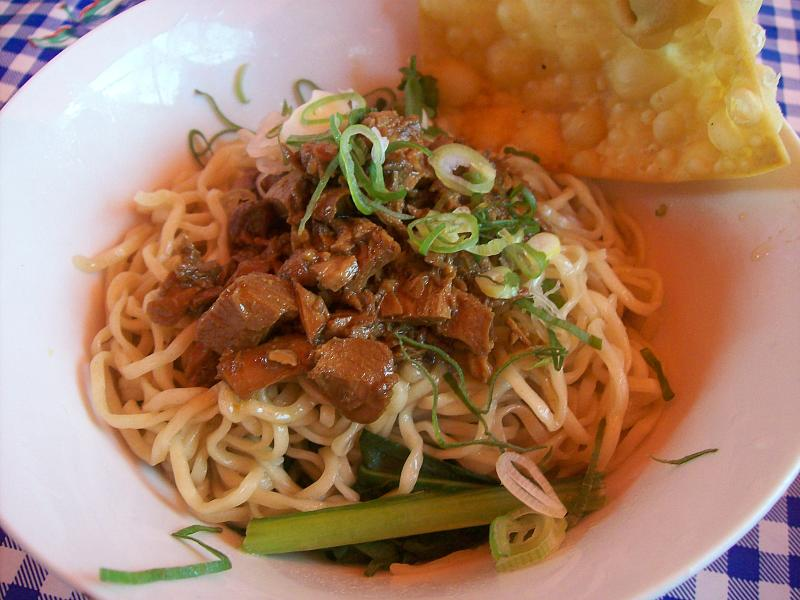
Mie ayam

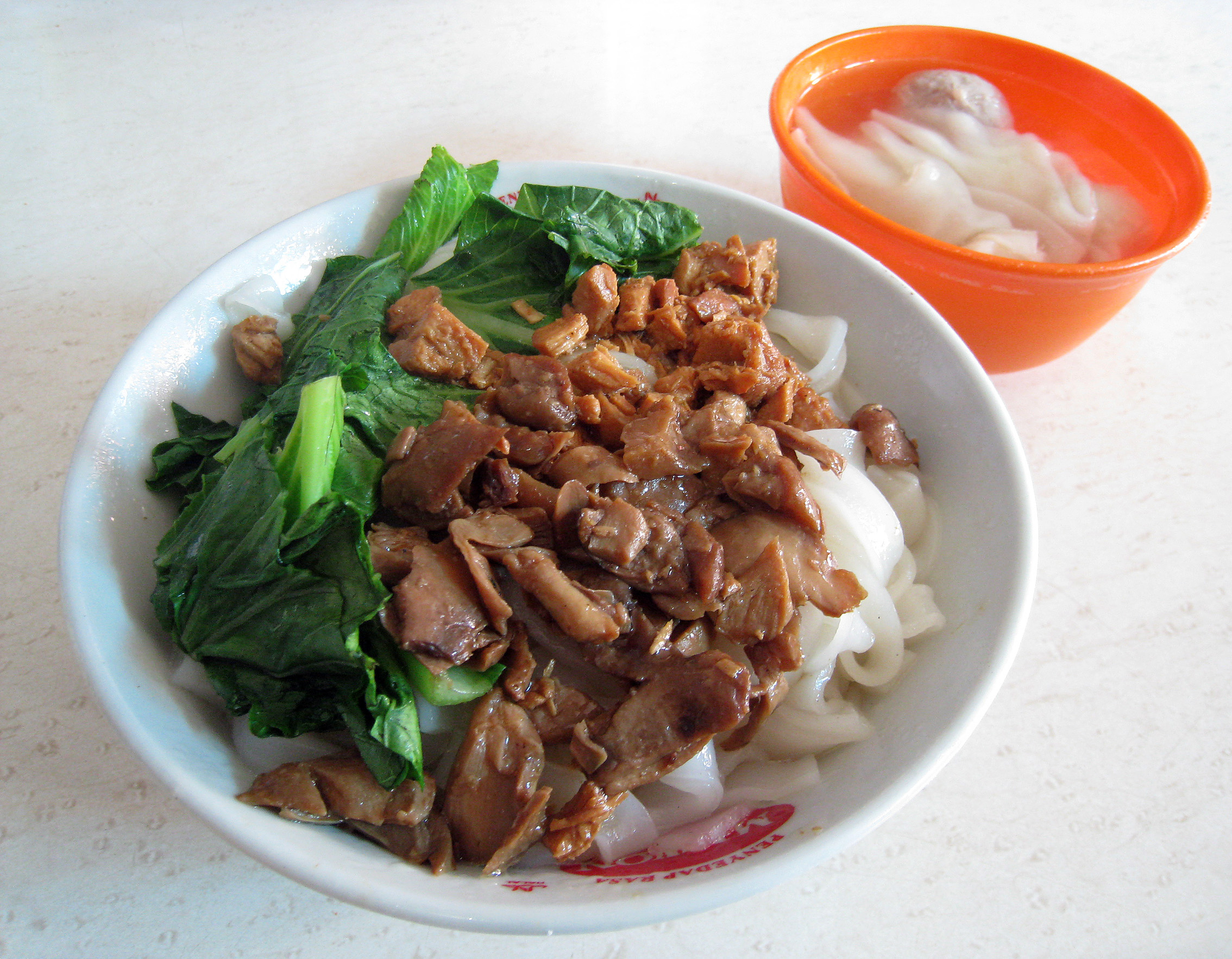
Kwetiau ayam

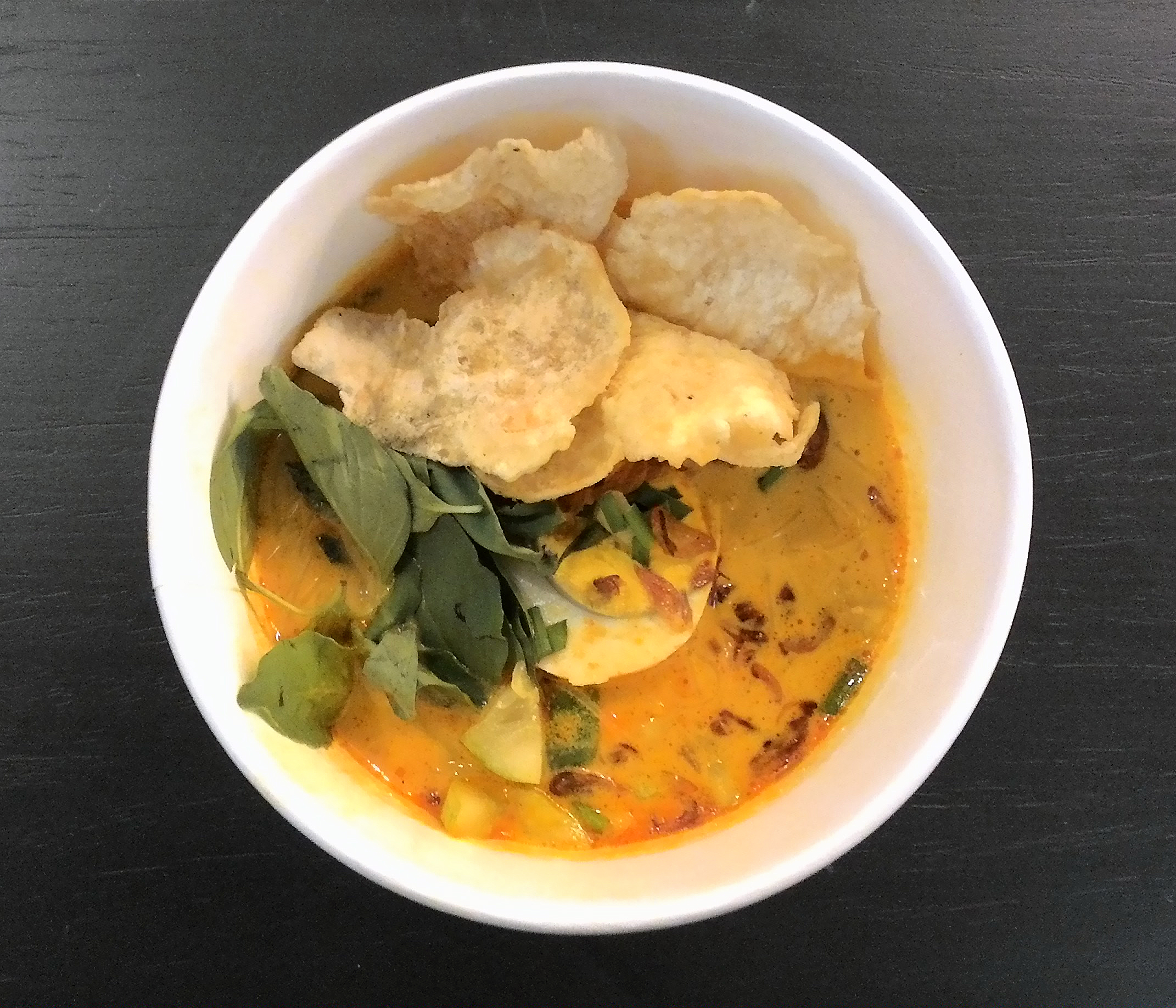
Laksa betawi

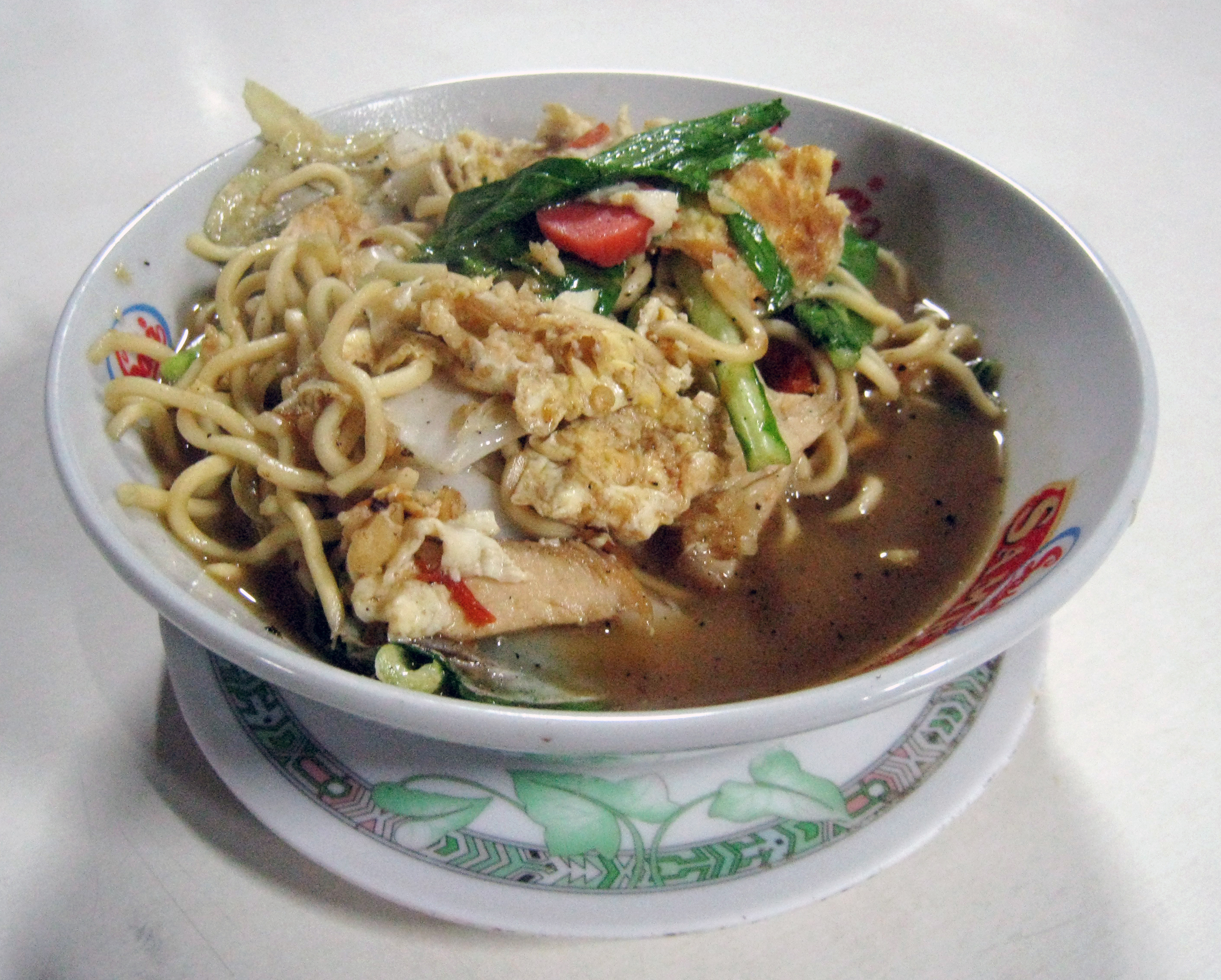
Mie kuah

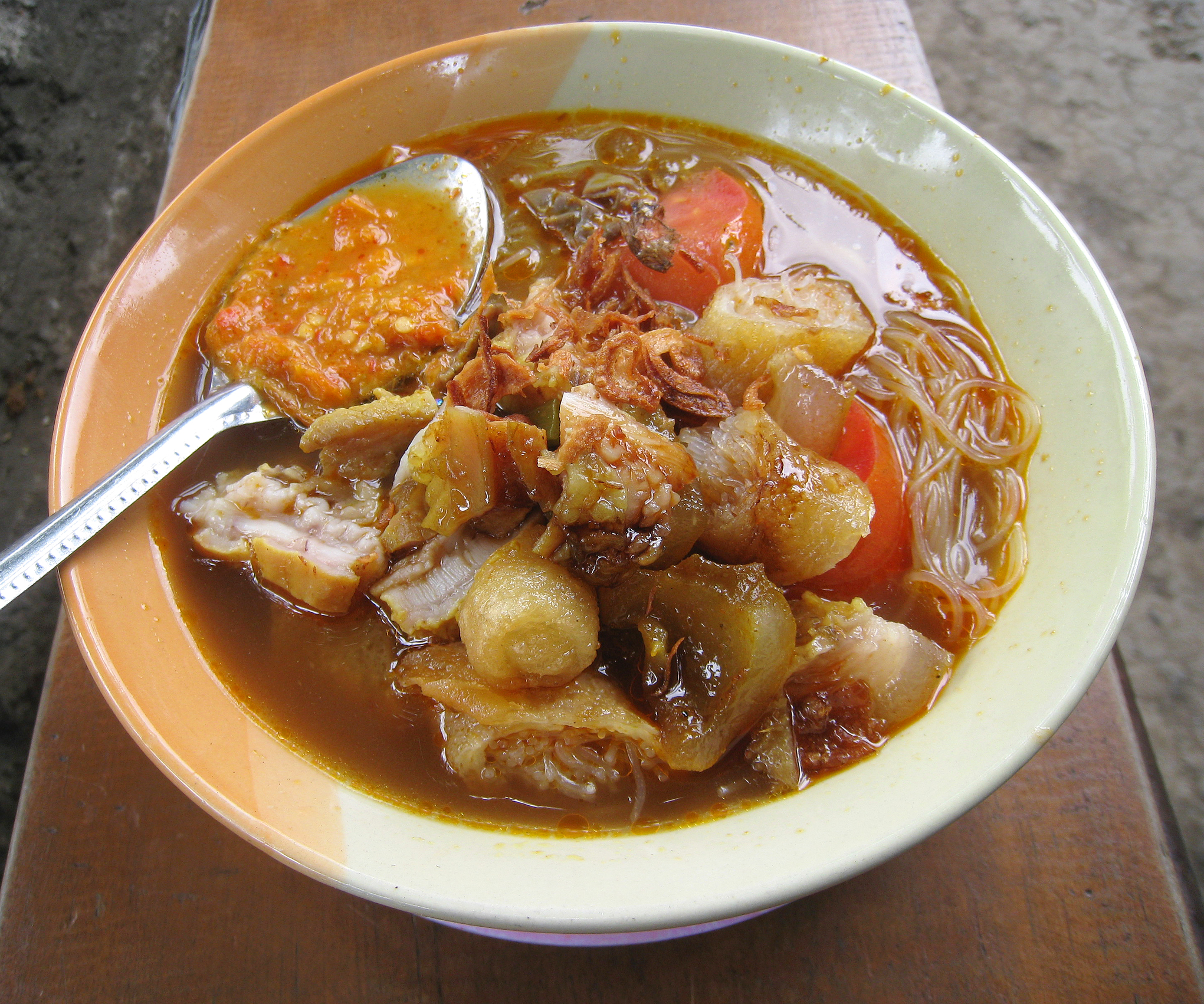
Soto mie

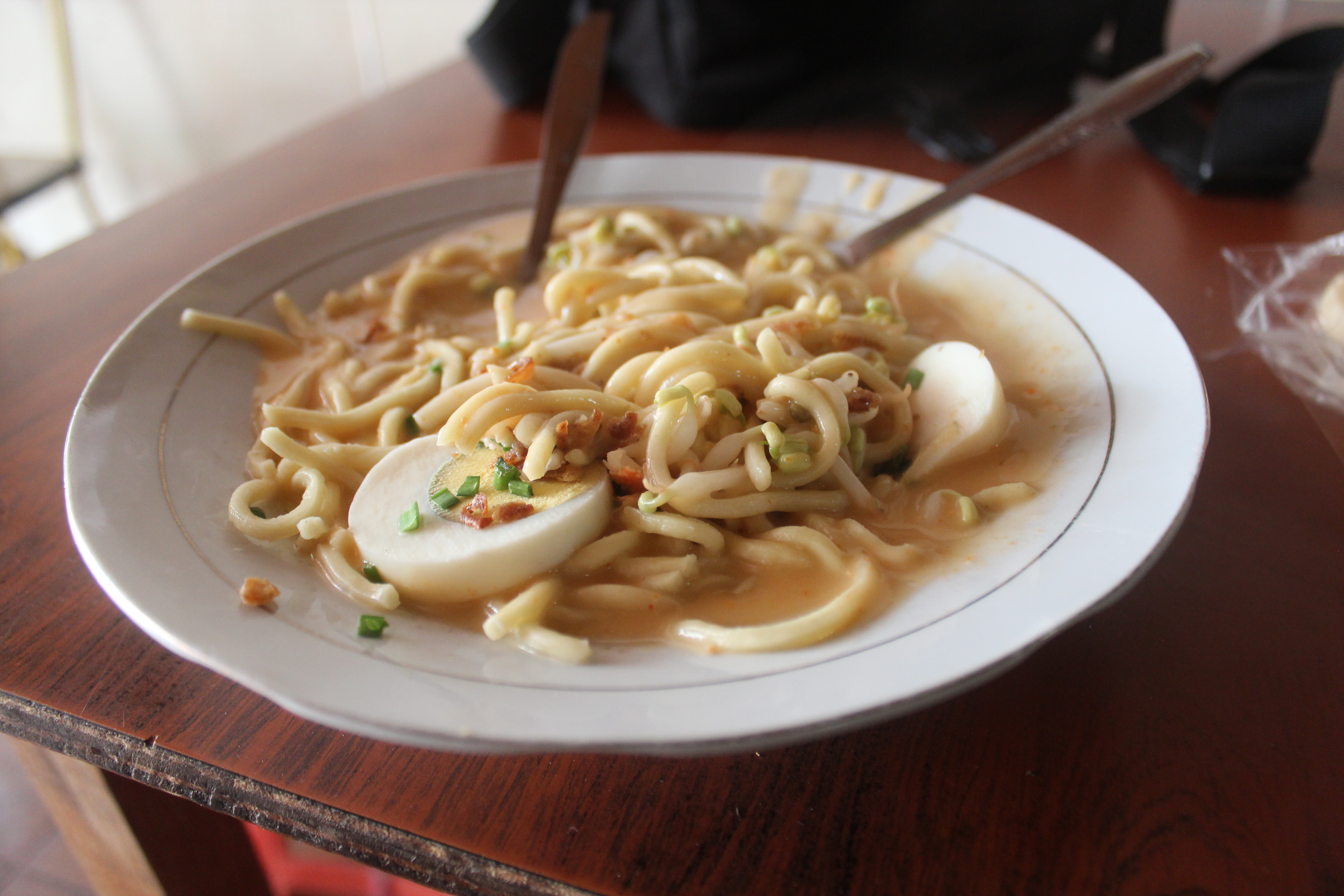
Mie celor

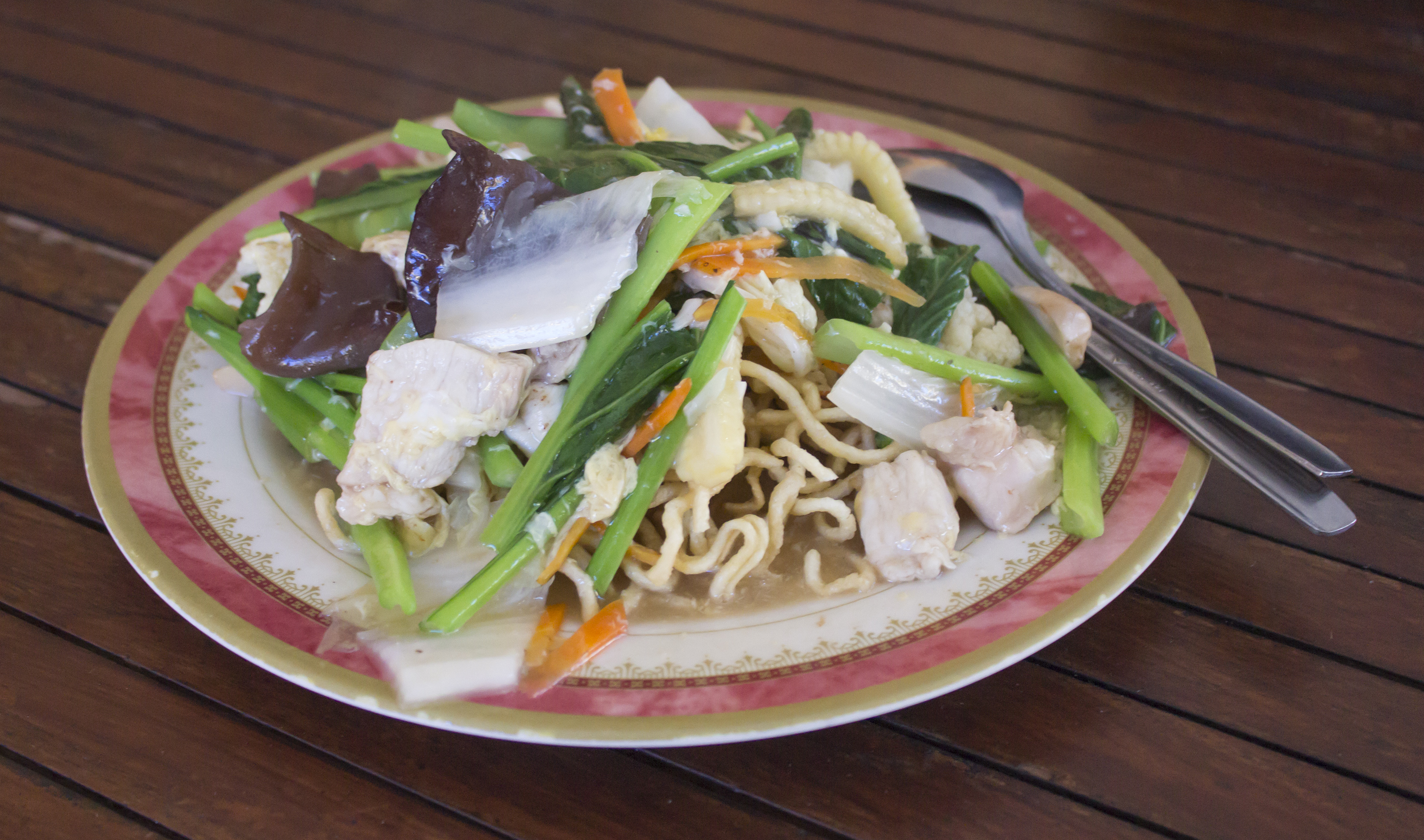
I fu mie

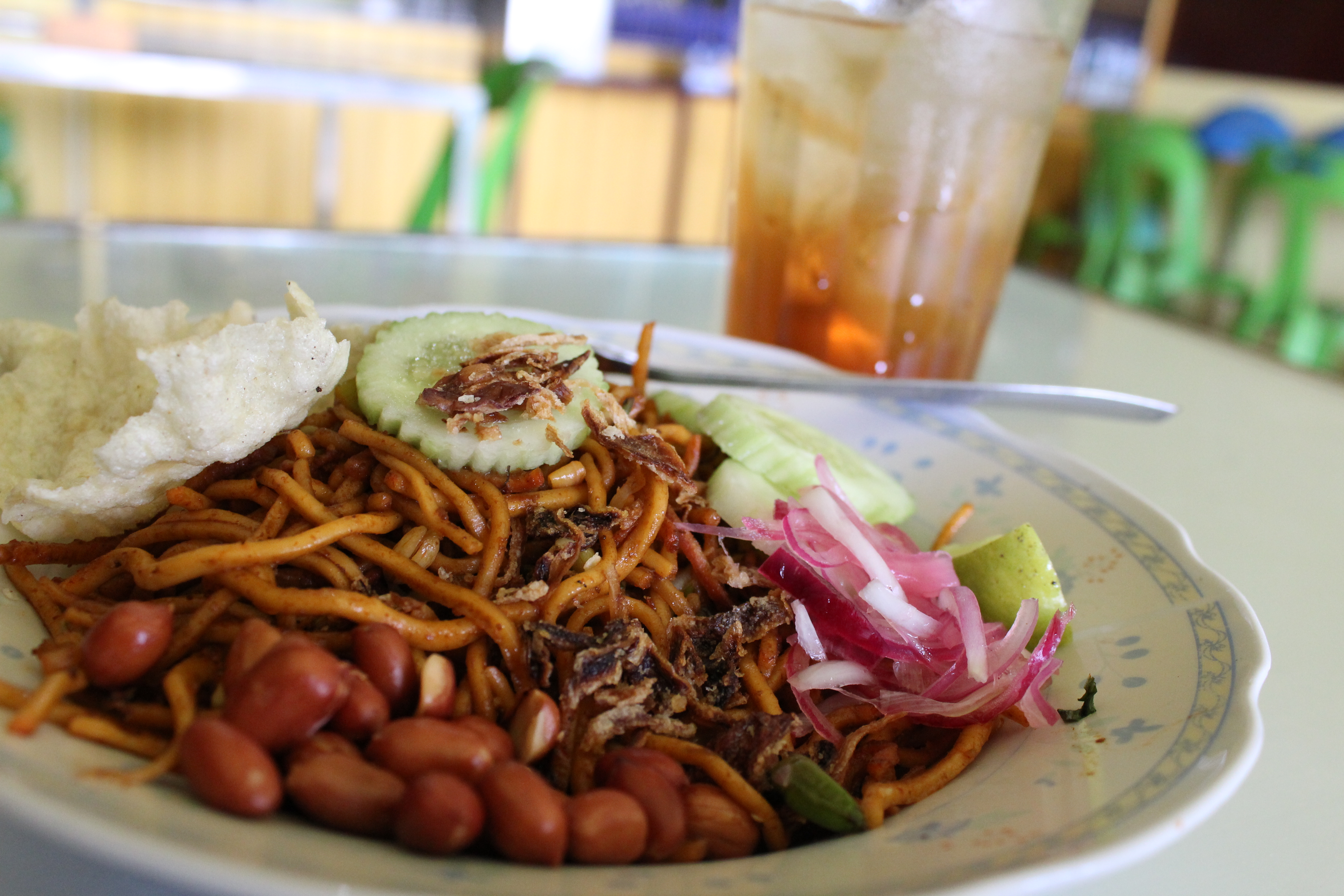
Mie aceh

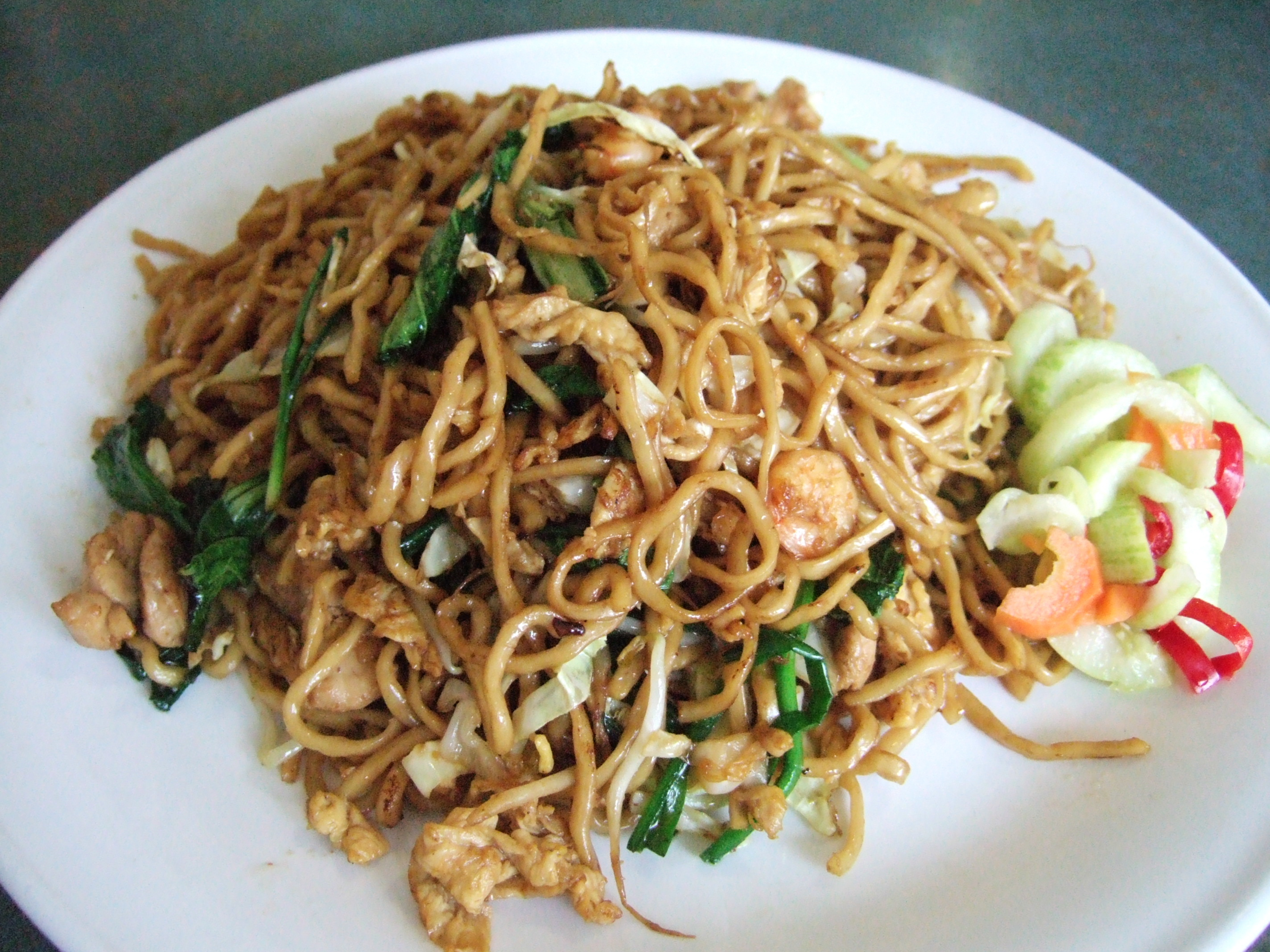
Mie goreng

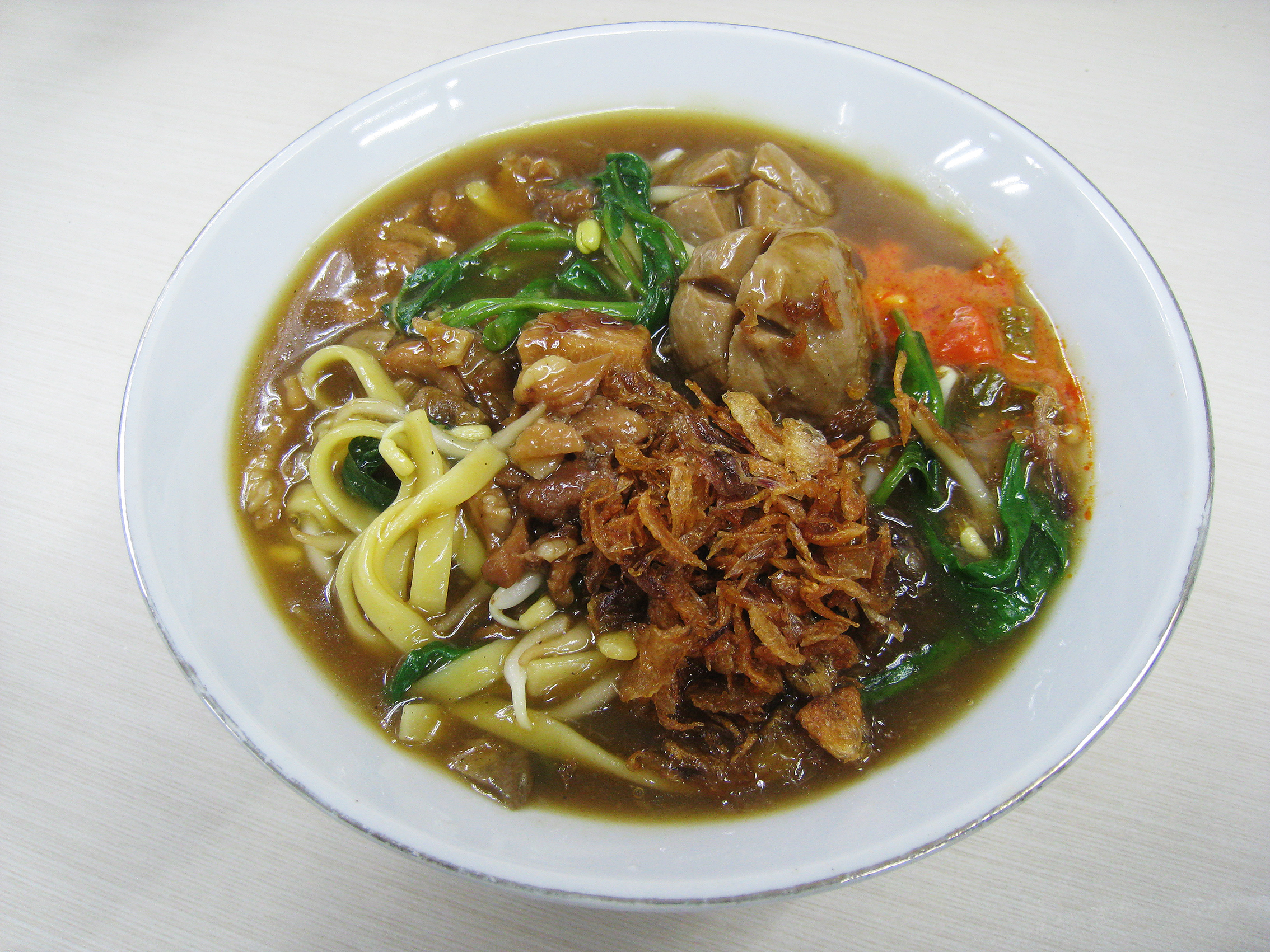
Mie kangkung

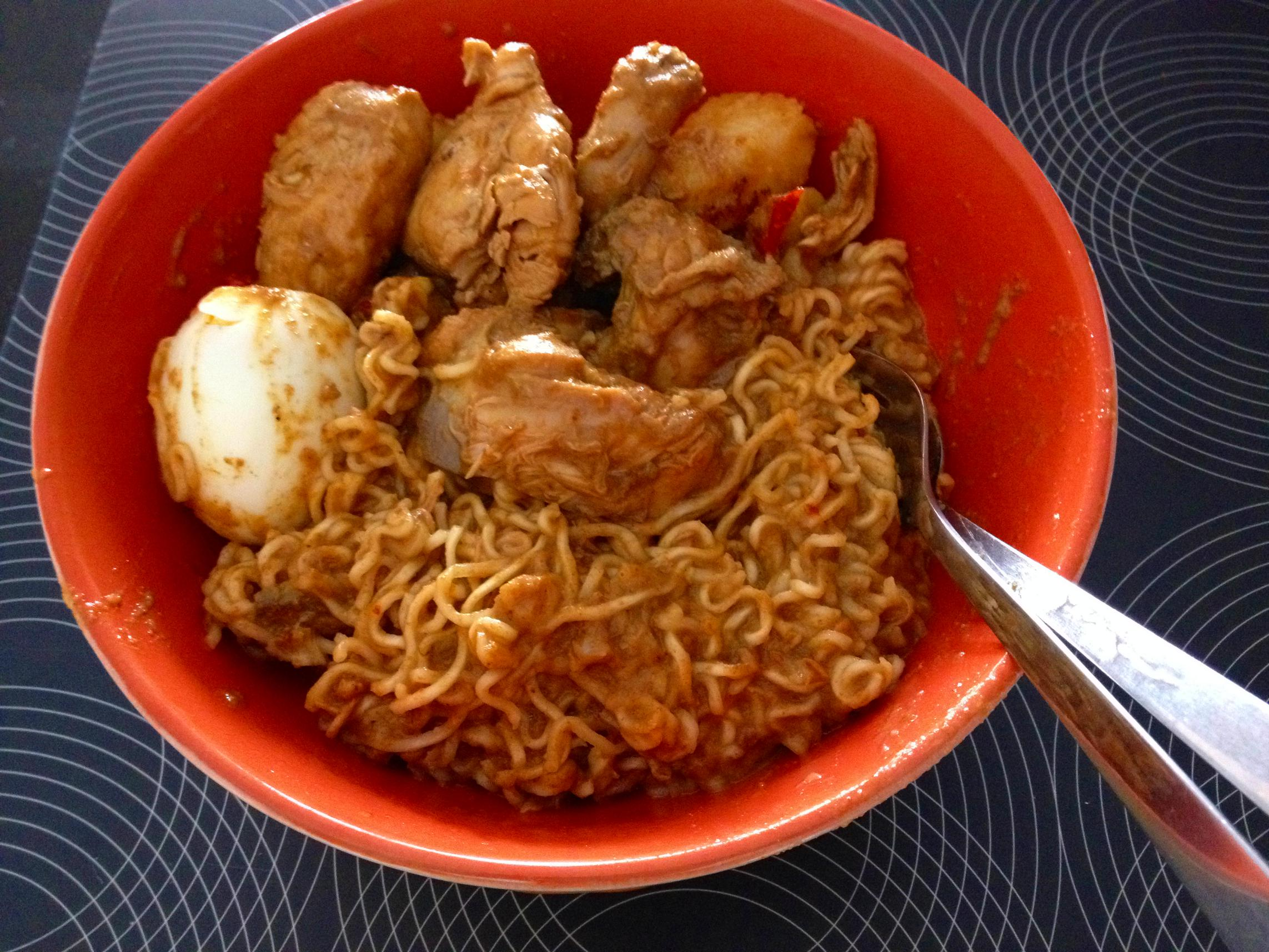
Mie kari

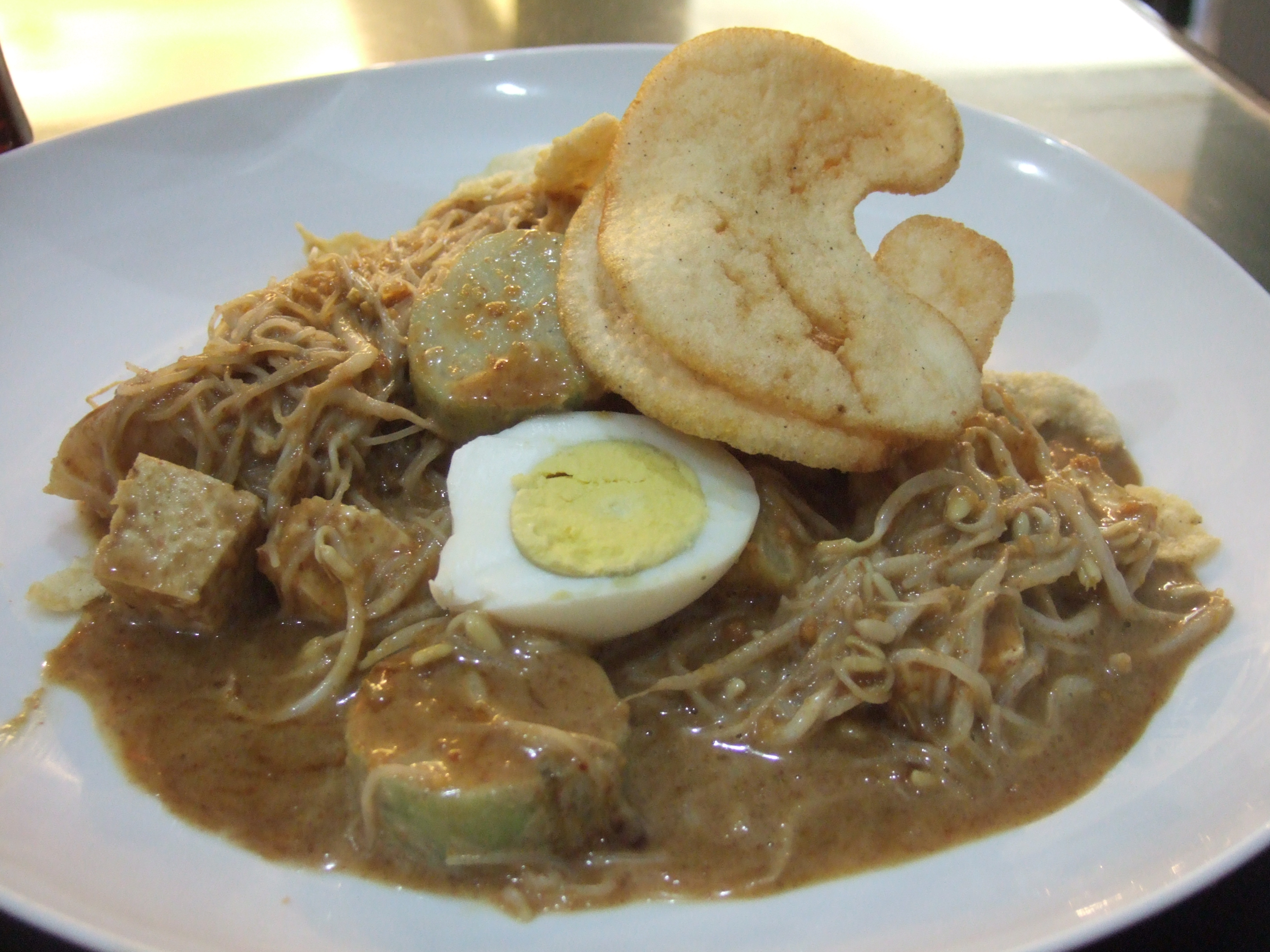
Ketoprak

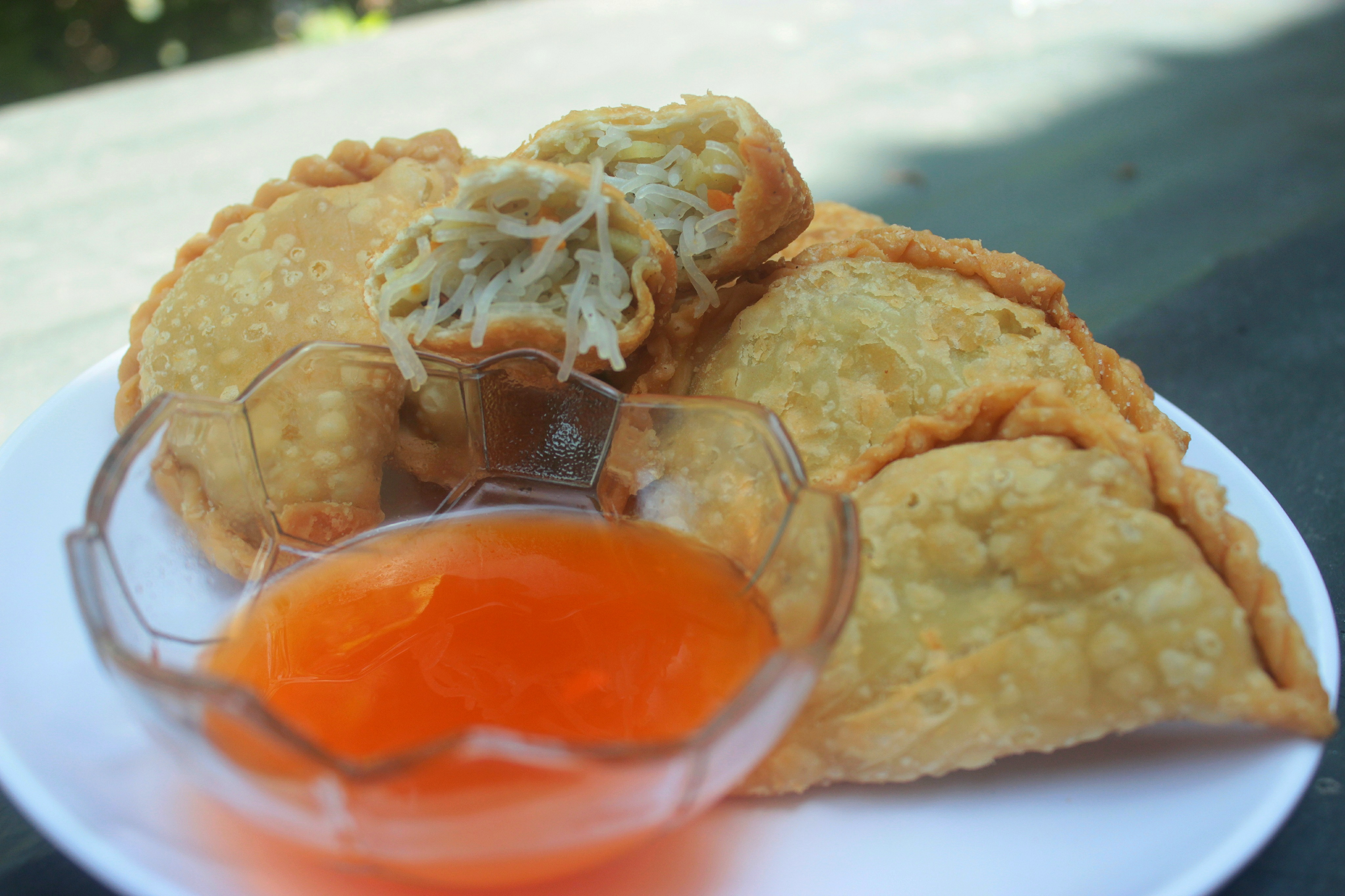
Jalangkote

=== Hot noodle soups ===
- Bakmi kuah, bakmi noodles contains chicken broth and pork fat, chicken fat or beef fat.
- Kwetiau ayam, flat noodle soup with chicken, sometimes served with pangsit (wonton) and bakso (meatball) soup.
- Kwetiau siram sapi, flat noodle soup with slices of beef or sometimes beef offal.
- Laksa banjar, steamed noodle-like balls, made from rice flour paste, served in thick yellowish soup made from coconut milk, ground spices and snakehead fish broth.
- Laksa betawi, laksa contains rice vermicelli, beansprouts, and dried shrimp broth soup.
- Laksa bogor, laksa contains rice vermicelli, beansprouts, and oncom.
- Laksa cibinong, yellowish laksa made of coconut milk, spices, bean sprout, rice vermicelli, hard-boiled eggs, cooked shredded chicken, fried shallots, and many lemon-basil leaves.
- Laksa medan, asam laksa contains flaked mackerel, wild ginger flower, lemongrass, and chili pepper.
- Laksa tambelan, laksa made of flaked sauteed smoked mackerel tuna or skipjack tuna, spices and lump of sagoo noodles, served in spicy kerisik.
- Laksa tangerang, laksa made of rice noodles shaped like spaghetti, chicken stock, mung beans, potatoes and chives.
- Lakse kuah, fish curry laksa, made of sagoo noodles with mashed tongkol or mackerel tuna flesh, served in spicy coconut milk curry made of spice mixture.
- Lakso, spicy noodle soup served in savoury yellowish coconut milk-based soup, flavoured with fish, and sprinkled with fried shallots.
- Mie aceh kuah, soup noodle dish that made with goat meat or seafood and served with emping, slices of shallots, cucumber, and lime.
- Mie ayam, chicken noodle soup comprising a bowl of chicken stock, boiled choy sim, celery leaves, diced chicken cooked with sweet soy sauce, and fried shallots. Some variants add mushrooms and fried/boiled pangsit (wonton). Normally it is eaten with chili sauce and pickles.
- Mie bakso, bakso meatballs served with yellow noodles and rice vermicelli in beef broth.
- Mie Bangladesh, a dish popular in Medan
- Mie cakalang, skipjack tuna noodle soup.
- Mie celor, a noodle dish served in coconut milk soup and shrimp-based broth, specialty of Palembang city, South Sumatra.
- Mie godhog jawa, soupy variant which uses local spices and served in rich chicken broth.
- Mie gomak, thick spicy noodle soup dish served in a coconut milk and andaliman-based broth.
- Mie kangkung, vegetable noodle soup with kangkung (water spinach), served with bakso meatball, chicken and mushroom.
- Mie kari kuah, soupy curry noodle dish.
- Mie koclok, chicken noodle soup from Cirebon. It is served with cabbage, bean sprout, boiled egg, fried onion and spring onion.
- Mie kocok, (lit: "shaken noodle"), is an Indonesian beef noodle soup from Bandung, consists of noodles served in rich beef consommé soup, kikil (beef tendon), bean sprouts and bakso (beef meatball), kaffir lime juice, and sprinkled with sliced fresh celery, scallion and fried shallot. Some recipes might add beef tripe.
- Mie kopyok, a noodle dish from Semarang. It is made of noodles with garlic broth, lontong, slices of fried tofu, bean sprouts, celery leaves and, crushed of kerupuk gendar.
- Mie kuah, literally "boiled noodles" in English, made of yellow egg noodles with a spicy soup gravy.
- Mie lor, noodle dish served in a thick starchy gravy—made of corn starch, spices and eggs—and thick flat yellow noodles with ngo hiang, fishcake, fish, round and flat meat dumpling, and half a boiled egg.
- Soto ayam, spicy chicken soup with rice vermicelli. Served with hard-boiled eggs, slices of fried potatoes, celery leaves, and fried shallots.
- Soto mie, noodle soup in spicy soto broth.
- Sup makaroni, Indonesian-style macaroni soup.
- Tekwan, bihun rice noodle with surimi fishcake akin to pempek, jicama and mushroom soup.

=== Dry noodle dishes ===
- Bakmi goreng, fried bakmi noodles.
- Bihun goreng, fried thin rice noodle with spices, fried shallots and chili darkened with sweet soy sauce.
- Char kway teow, stir-fried noodle with egg, slices of sausages, fishcake, beansprouts, and less commonly with other ingredients. This noodle dish almost similar to kwetiau goreng.
- I fu mie, crispy deep fried thick noodle dish served in a thick savoury sauce with pieces of meat or seafood and vegetables.
- Kwetiau goreng, stir fried flat noodle. This noodle dish almost similar to char kway teow.
- Mie aceh goreng, stir-fried and dry noodle dish that made with goat meat or seafood and served with emping, slices of shallots, cucumber, and lime.
- Mie balap, noodle dish from Medan.
- Mie caluk, noodle dish served with a splash of thick spicy sauce made from a mixture of tomato, chili pepper or chili sauce, coconut milk, ground peanuts, spiced with shallot, garlic, lemongrass and citrus leaf, and served with pieces of vegetables, sliced cucumber and krupuk.
- Mie goreng, spicy fried noodle dish made of thin yellow noodles stir fried in cooking oil with garlic, onion or shallots, fried prawn, chicken, beef, or sliced of meatballs, chili, Chinese cabbage, cabbages, tomatoes, egg, and other vegetables.
- Mie goreng Indomie, the instant version of mie goreng.
- Mie goreng jawa, Javanese-style of mie goreng (also known as mie goreng tek-tek by local) with drier and sweeter version due to addition of sweet soy sauce.
- Mie hokkien, fried noodle dish, consists of egg noodles and rice noodles stir-fried with egg, slices of pork, prawns and squid, and served and garnished with vegetables, small pieces of lard, sambal and lime.
- Mie kari, fried curry noodle dish.
- Mie kering, dried noodle served with thick gravy and sliced chicken, shrimp, mushrooms, liver, and squid.

=== Hot noodle rolls ===
- Lumpia, spring roll made of thin paper-like or crepe-like pastry skin called "lumpia wrapper" with noodle, chicken, shrimp, egg and vegetables as filling.
- Tee long pan, rice noodle roll served with red chilli sauce, crushed roasted-peanuts, fried onions, and dried shrimp.

=== Other type noodle dishes ===
- Jalangkote, fried pastry with an empanada-shape and stuffed with rice vermicelli, vegetables, potatoes and eggs. Spicy, sweet and sour sauce will be dipped into prior to be eaten.
- Ketoprak, a vegetarian dish consisting of rice vermicelli, tofu, vegetables and rice cake served in peanut sauce.
- Macaroni schotel, macaroni casserole that made of macaroni with cheese, potato and meat (smoked beef, sausage or tuna).
- Pastel, thin pastry dumpling filled with rice vermicelli and meat (usually chicken) mixed with vegetables (chopped carrot and beans).
- Putu mayang, rice noodles with a mixture of coconut milk and served with liquid palm sugar.

== Notable instant noodle brands ==
- Indomie
- Mie Sedaap
- Pop Mie
- Sarimi

== See also ==
- Cuisine of Indonesia
- Instant noodles
- List of Indonesian dishes
- List of Indonesian condiments
- List of noodles
- List of noodle dishes
