= Mie caluk =

Indonesian noodle dish

Mi Caluk
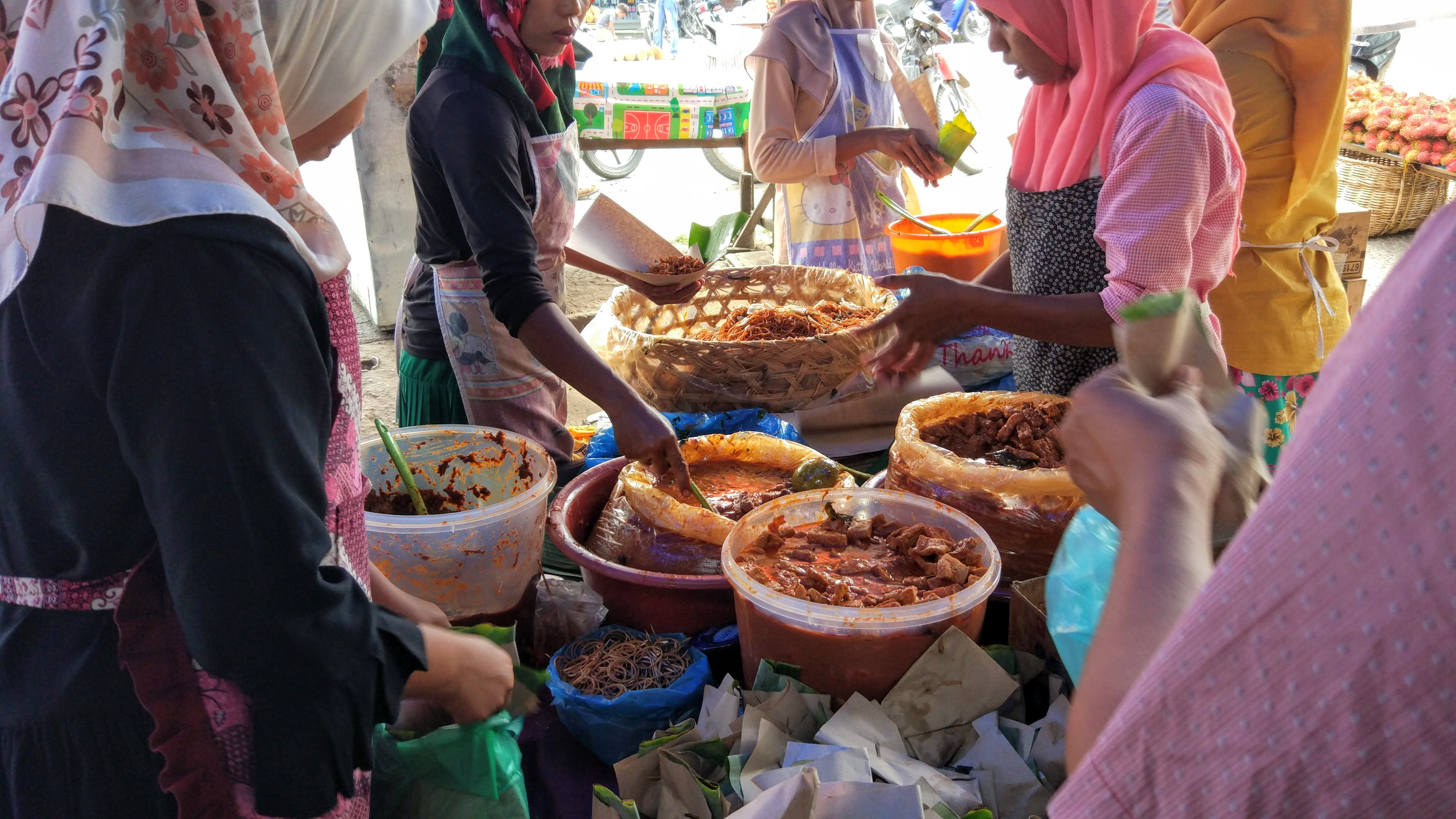
- Mi Caluk
- Alternative names: Mie Caluek
- Course: Main course
- Place of origin: Indonesia
- Region or state: Aceh
- Main ingredients: Noodle, soy sauce, chicken meat

Mi caluk is a traditional Indonesian-Aceh noodle dish, which is commonly found in traditional markets and food courts in Pidie Regency and Pidie Jaya Regency.

It is a noodle dish served with a splash of thick spicy sauce made from a mixture of tomato, chili pepper or chili sauce, coconut milk, ground peanuts, spiced with shallot, garlic, lemongrass and citrus leaf, and served with pieces of vegetables, sliced cucumber and krupuk. The presentation of mi caluk is slightly similar to spaghetti. Each serving of mi caluk is not large, so it is more precisely categorised as a snack. Thus, sellers of mi caluk are often found in makeshift stalls, and do not have stalls in a food court as is usual for food and drink stalls in Aceh.

== See also ==
- Mie aceh
- Mie jawa
- Mie goreng
- Mie rebus
- Mie celor
