= Mee rebus =

Noodle soup

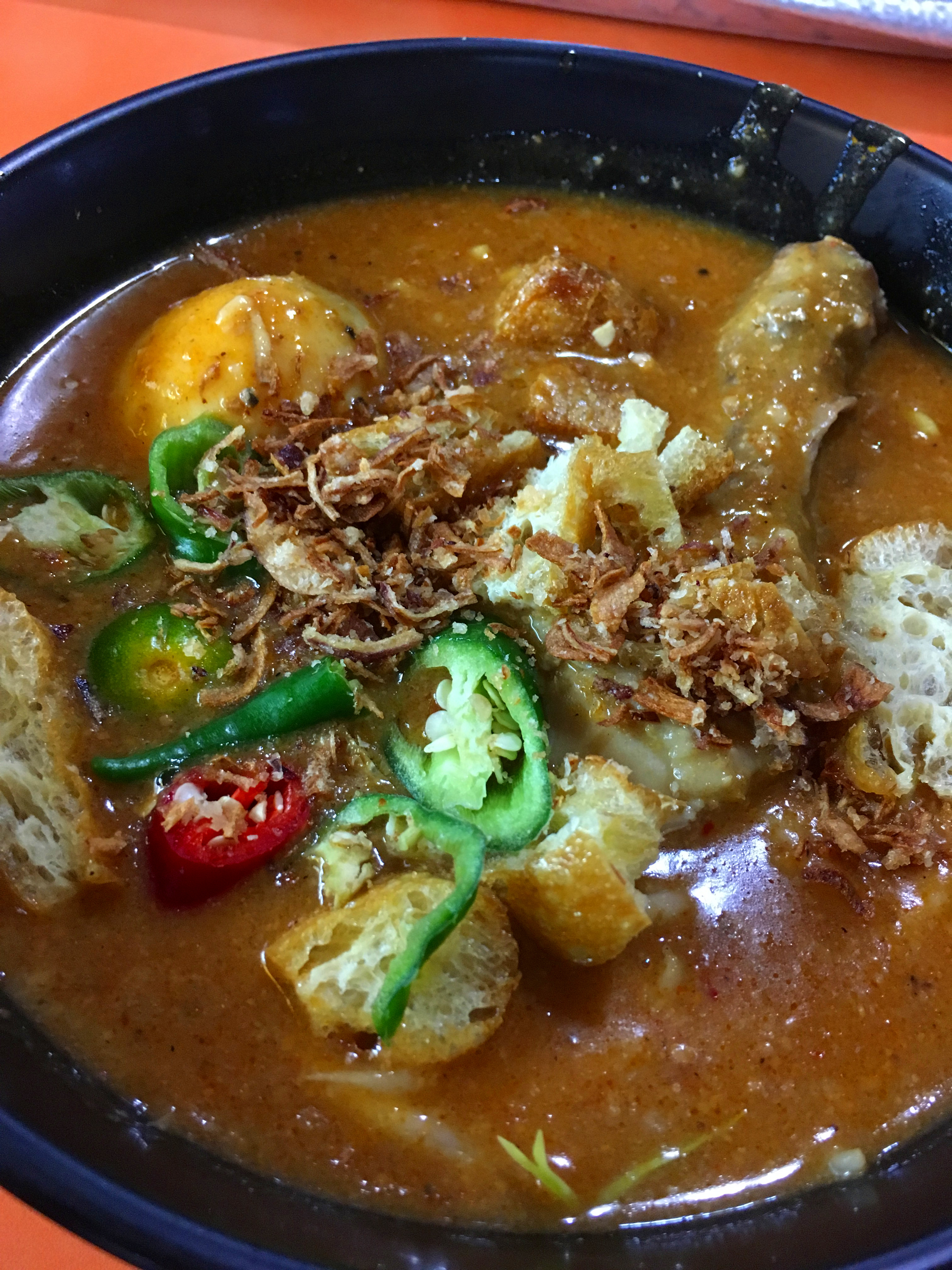
- A typical mee rebus served in a hawker centre
- Alternative names: Mie rebus, mie kuah
- Type: Noodle
- Course: Main course
- Region or state: Indonesia, Malaysia, Singapore
- Main ingredients: Noodles (eggs), gravy (either dried shrimp-based or tauchu-based)

Mee rebus (IPA: /ˌmiː rəˈboʊs, -ʊs/ mee rə-BOHSS or rə-BUUSS, Malay pronunciation: [mi rəbos], also known as mie rebus/mi rebus and mie kuah (the latter literally means "noodle soup" in Indonesian) is a Maritime Southeast Asian noodle soup dish. Literally translated as "boiled noodles", it is popular in Maritime Southeast Asian countries such as Indonesia, Malaysia, and Singapore.

== Variations ==
=== Indonesia ===
1. Mie rebus Bengkalis (Bengkalis-style mie rebus), clear soup noodle with anchovy or chicken, added with chopped bird's-eye chili, peanut and fried egg.
2. Mie rebus Jawa (Javanese-style mie rebus), also known as mie rebus tek-tek or mie tek-tek kuah. The name of "tek-tek" comes from the sound made by vendors when they hit their woks or bamboo gongs to attract customers at night.
3. Mie rebus Medan (Medan-style mie rebus), sometimes called emie. The dish is also influenced by Indian descendants in the city of Medan.
4. Mie rebus Padang (Padang-style mie rebus), the main ingredients are yellow noodles and spicy soup made from ground chilies also sprinkled with kerupuk merah.

=== Malaysia ===
1. Mee rebus Kuala Terengganu (Kuala Terengganu-style mee rebus)

== Similar dishes ==
In certain areas, a similar variety of mee rebus is called mie Jawa, mee Jawa, mi Jawa, bakmi Jawa or bakmi godhog, although this is a popular misnomer, since mie Jawa is slightly different from mie rebus. Despite sharing similar spices, mie Jawa contains chicken instead of shrimp. A dish similar to mie rebus in Indonesia is called mie celor, and it is popular in Palembang. Furthermore, Batam has a noodle dish called mie lendir.

== Gallery ==
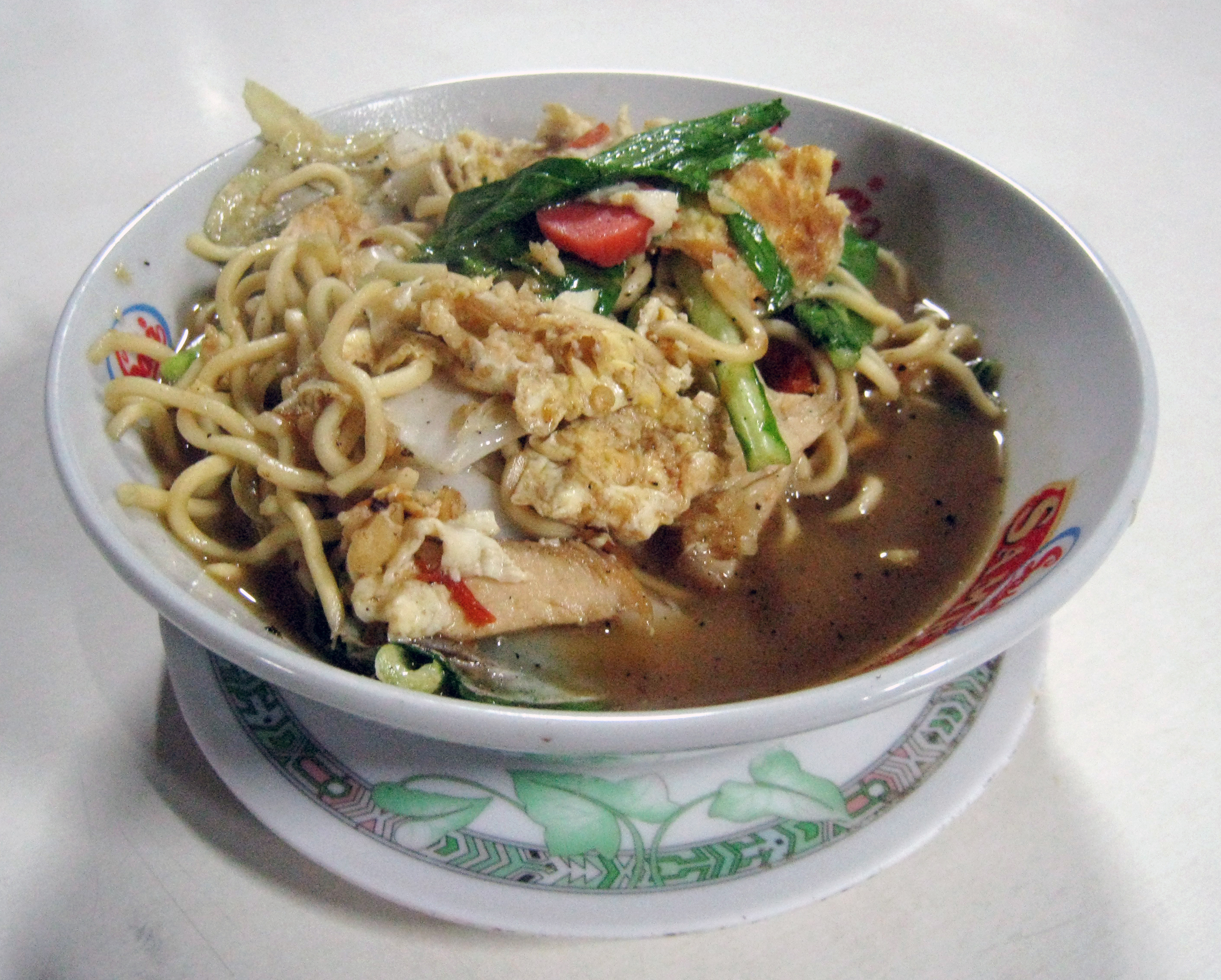
Javanese-style mie rebus served in a warung in Java, Indonesia

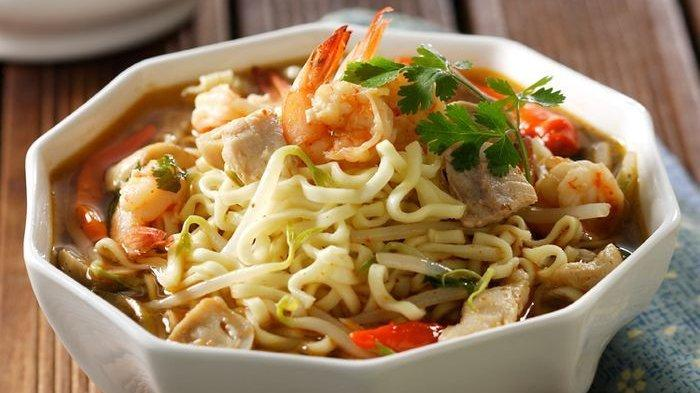
Medan-style mie rebus

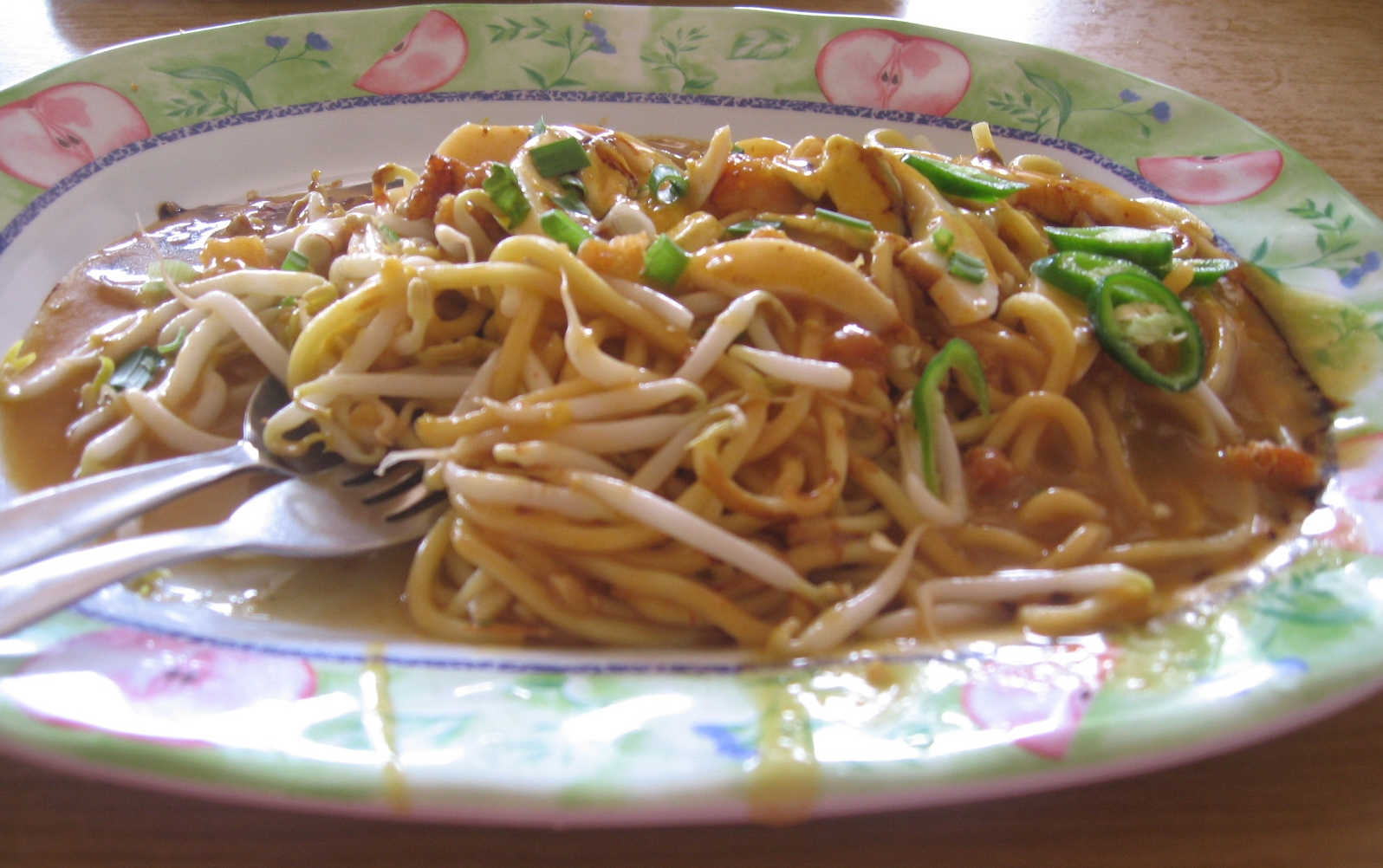
Mee rebus served in a coffee shop in Malaysia

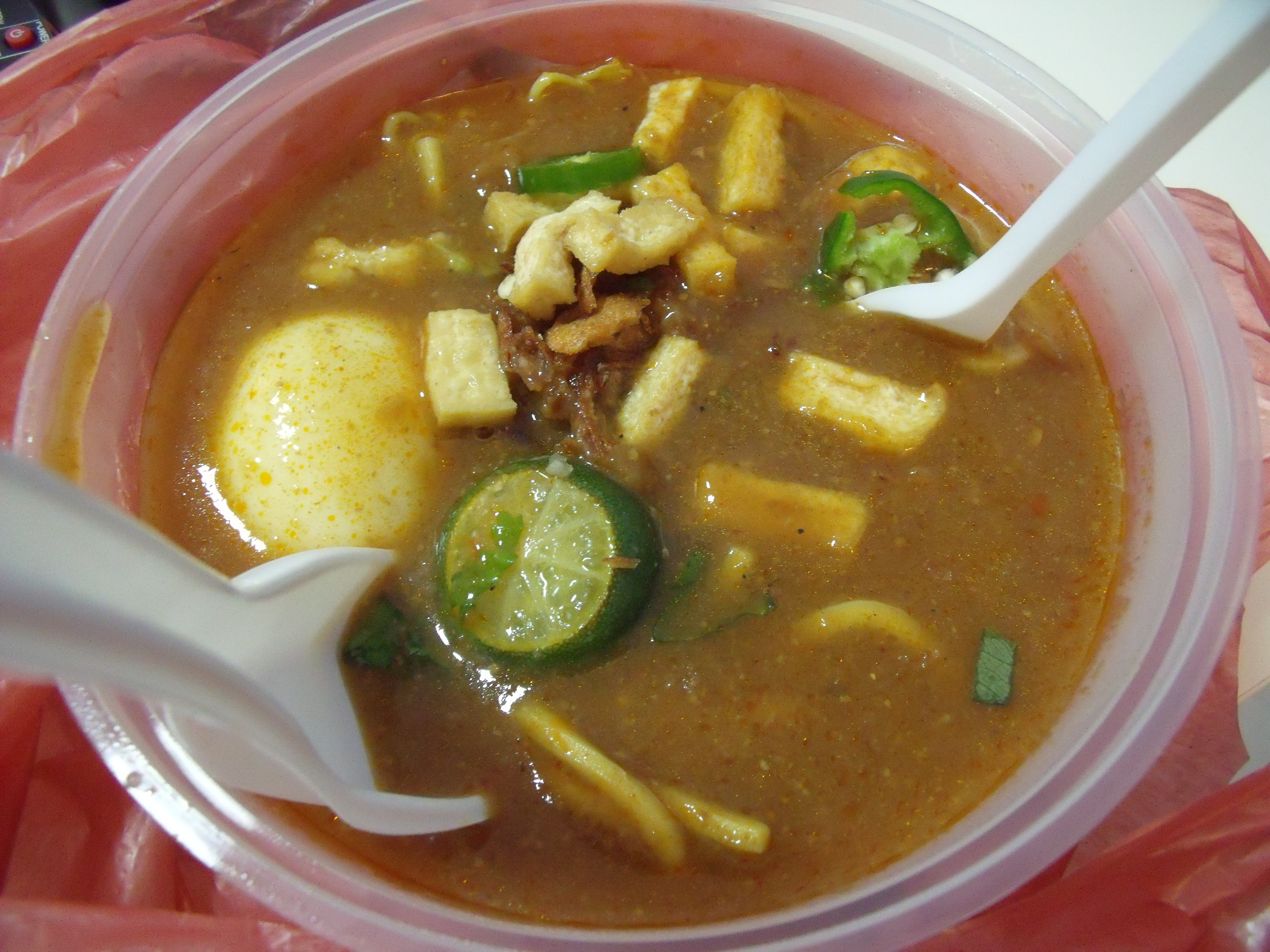
Mee rebus takeaway in Bukit Batok, Singapore

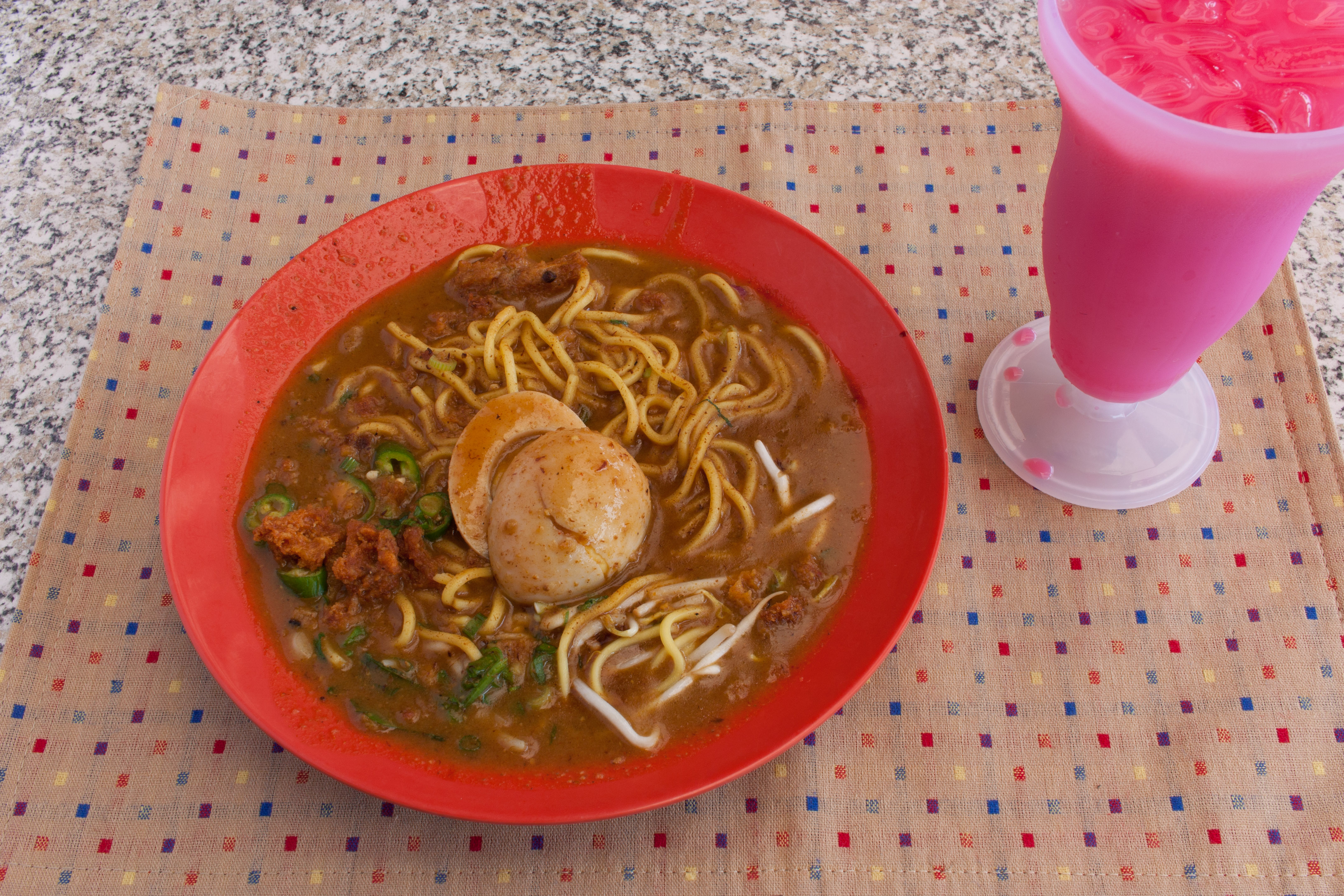
Mee rebus and Bandung drink

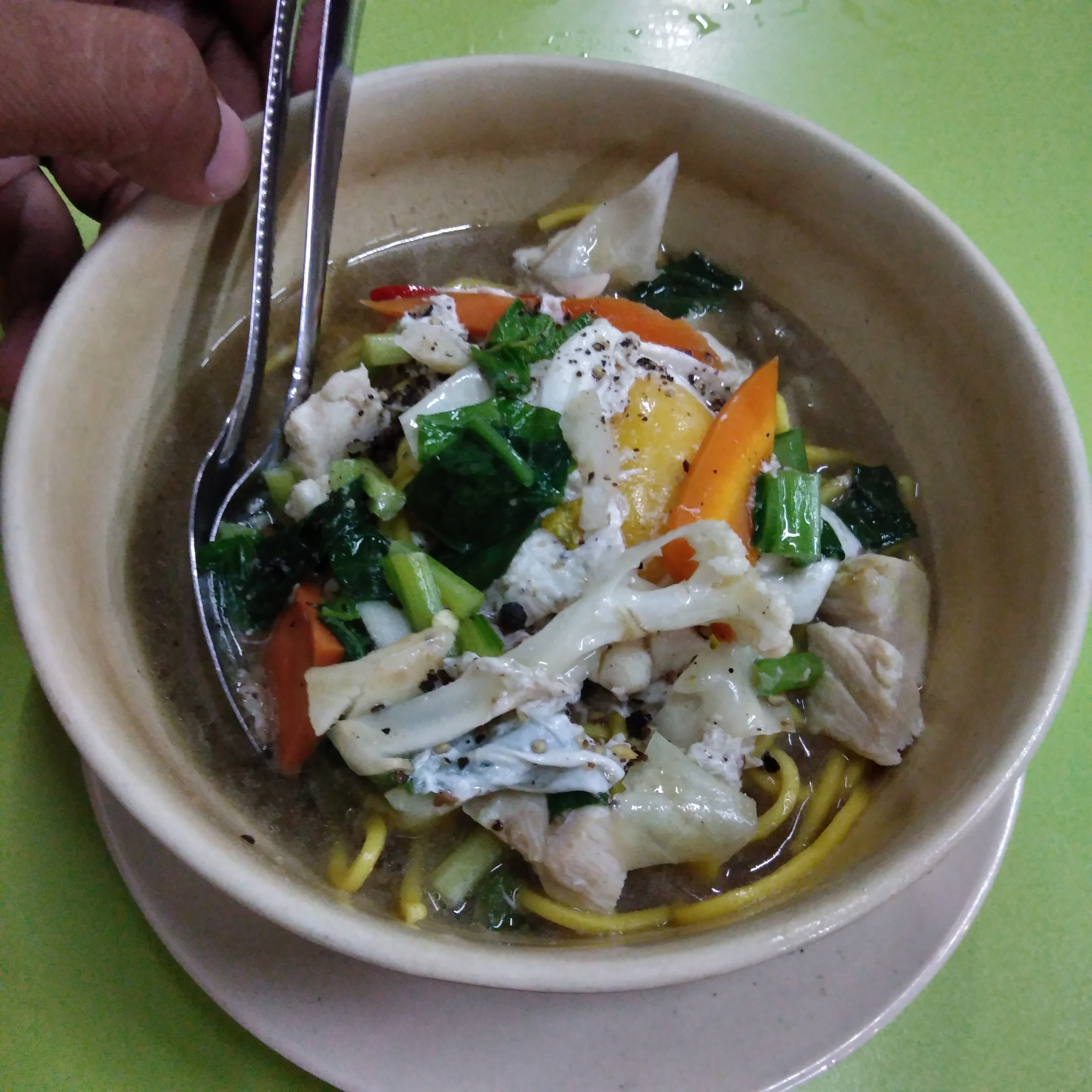
Kuala Terengganu-style mee rebus

== See also ==
- Mee bandung
- Mie goreng
- Mie ayam
- Mie Aceh
- Mie celor
- Kwetiau goreng
