= Mie Bangladesh =

Indonesian noodle dish

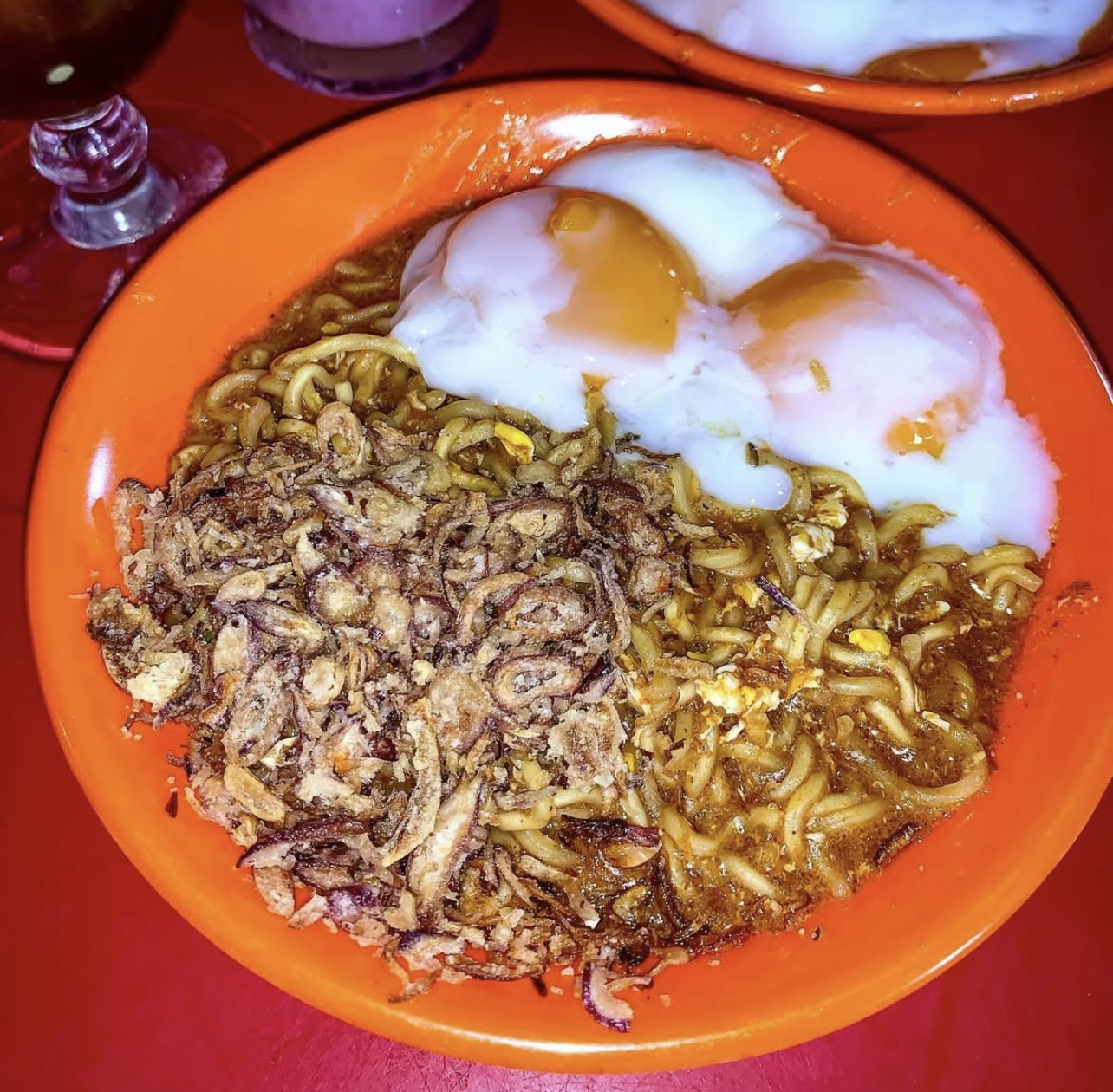
- Alternative names: Mie goreng banglades, mie goreng bangladesh, mie nyemek
- Type: Noodle
- Course: Main course
- Place of origin: Indonesia
- Region or state: Nationwide
- Serving temperature: Hot
- Main ingredients: Fried noodles with half-cooked egg, chicken, fried onions

Mie Bangladesh (transl. Bangladeshi noodles; also called mie nyemek) is a dish of Indonesian cuisine. It is a variation on mie goreng and originated in the Acehnese city of Lhokseumawe.

== Ingredients, preparation, and serving ==
The dish is typically created using packaged commercial instant noodles such as Indomie stir-fried in a sauce of herbs and spices, using a bumbu spice mix such as medok, along with the commercial seasoning packet typically included with the noodles. The additional spices thicken the sauce and give the dish a richer color and flavor than a typical bowl of instant noodles or ramen.

It is served nyemek, or slightly soupy, and is sometimes served with other ingredients such a half-cooked egg, which gives the dish a creamy texture and flavor, and fried onions or mustard greens.

It is often served at warkop (a portmanteau of Warung Kopi, meaning "coffee stall"), a food served in roadside stalls.

== Origin and popularity ==
While the name is sometimes taken to mean it is a dish of or inspired by Bangladeshi cuisine, it originated in Medan, North Sumatra. There are anecdotal explanations of the etymology of the name.

The dish became well known in the 2020s after Indonesian food critics on Instagram and TikTok posted about it.

== See also ==
- Mie aceh, traditional Indonesian noodle dish that incorporates a bumbu spice mix
- Indonesian noodles
