= Bakmi jawa =

Indonesian noodle dish

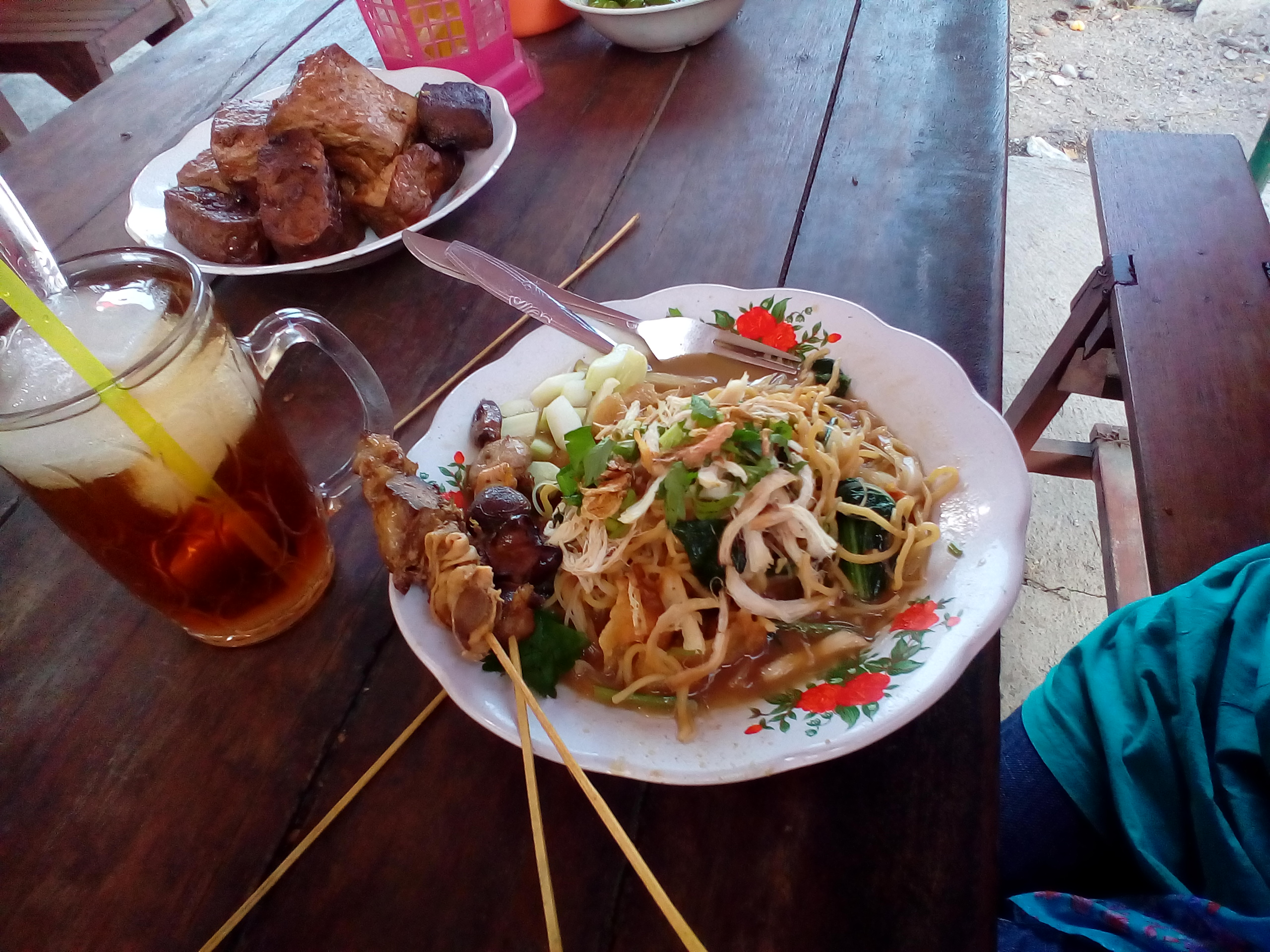
- Bakmi jawa served in a warung in Java
- Alternative names: Bakmi jawa, mi jawa, mee Jawa
- Type: Noodle
- Course: Main
- Place of origin: Indonesia
- Region or state: Yogyakarta; Central Java
- Serving temperature: Hot
- Main ingredients: Noodles, chicken, eggs, garlic, shallot, candlenut, coriander, cabbage, leek, choy sum, tomato, salt and pepper

Bakmi jawa (lit. 'Javanese noodles'), also called mi jawa or mie jawa in Indonesia, or mee Jawa in Malaysia, is a traditional Javanese-style noodle, commonly found in Indonesia and Malaysia. The dish is made of yellow noodles, chicken, vegetables, egg and spices. The recipe however, is slightly different between mie jawa in Indonesia and mee Jawa in Malaysia.

Because of its similarity, mie jawa is often confused with mie rebus (boiled noodles), but only mie godhog jawa is identical to mie rebus.

== Origin ==
Just like many Asian noodle recipes, it is thought that this noodle was influenced by Chinese noodle soup. The spice however, is more suited to Javanese taste, which is more spicy and slightly sweet. The name suggests that this dish originated from Java, Indonesia, or created by Javanese people. In Indonesia, mie jawa thought was originated from Central Java area, and often associated with the royal city of Yogyakarta. Mie jawa vendors are commonly found in Javanese cities and towns, with major concentration in Yogyakarta, Klaten, Wonosobo, Semarang and Solo. The dish also can be found sold by street vendors using cart, either mobile/travelling or stationed in busy street, in other Indonesian major cities including Jakarta, Bandung and Surabaya.

In Malaysia, it is believed that the dish was brought by the Javanese Malaysian community during the early 19th-century in Malaysia. The recipe of mee Jawa in Malaysia is also differ by the addition of sweet potato-base sauce into the dish. mee Jawa mobile hawkers sold it by carrying two baskets with long wooden sticks on their shoulder and cycling by bicycle from one place to another. Not to mention Malaysia has tropical weather which sometimes has drastic heatwaves from time to time. Despite that, this dish was still sold anyhow.

== Bakmi jawa in Indonesia ==
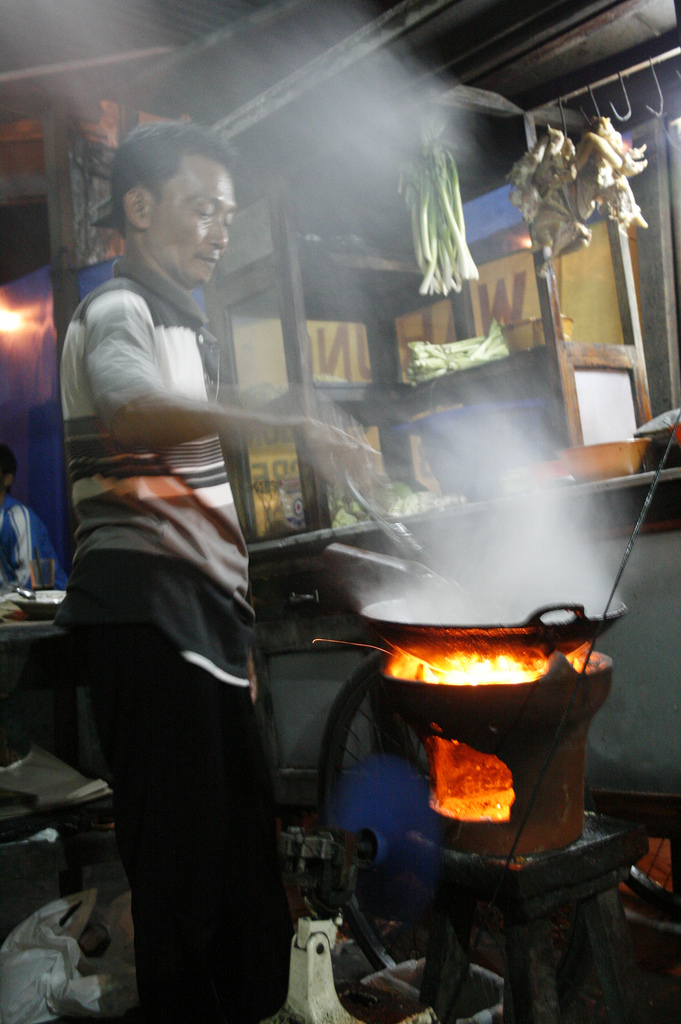
Bakmi jawa vendor, cooking the noodles using charcoal-fuelled earthenware stove

In Indonesia the term bakmi jawa or mie jawa is simply means "Javanese noodles", and there are multiple variants exist in the country. In Indonesia there are three major variants of Javanese noodles, which differ according to its moist content.

Mie godhog jawa
The most common mie jawa variant is mie godhog jawa (Javanese boiled noodle), a soupy variant which uses local spices and served in rich chicken broth.

Mie goreng jawa
Another variant is mie goreng jawa (Javanese fried noodle) which is the Javanese variant of Indonesia's favourite mie goreng. It is the drier and sweeter version due to addition of sweet soy sauce.

Mie nyemek jawa
The third variant is the mie lethek jawa or mie nyemek jawa, both names in Javanese language denotes "moist" and "soft", which means the noodle is soft and moist, but not as soupy as Mie Godhog Jawa. Its moist degree approximately between boiled noodle and fried noodle.

Traditional authentic bakmi jawa uses ayam kampung (local breed free-range chicken), uses local spice including shallot, garlic, coriander, candlenut, pepper, leek, cabbage, green tomato and cooked on hot charcoal-fuelled earthenware stove to acquire better heat and gave an earthy smoky aroma.

== Mee Jawa in Malaysia ==
The dish is made up of yellow egg noodles drenched in blended sweet potato base with tomato sauce and prawn stock. The famous stalls are located within the states of Malaysia called Penang and Sarawak.

The gravy is made of beef stock to give it a slightly meaty flavor on top of the sweetness of the sweet potato and tart flavor of the tomato paste. The resulting gravy is a thick concoction with the natural sweetness of the sweet potato base balanced out by the tomato paste so that it is not cloyingly sweet.

The main ingredients of the dish consists of bean curd, beansprouts, hard-boiled egg, ground peanuts and, optionally, fried shallots or shrimp.

== See also ==
- Mie aceh
- Mie celor
- Mie goreng
