= Dried shrimp =

Dried shrimp used as seasoning

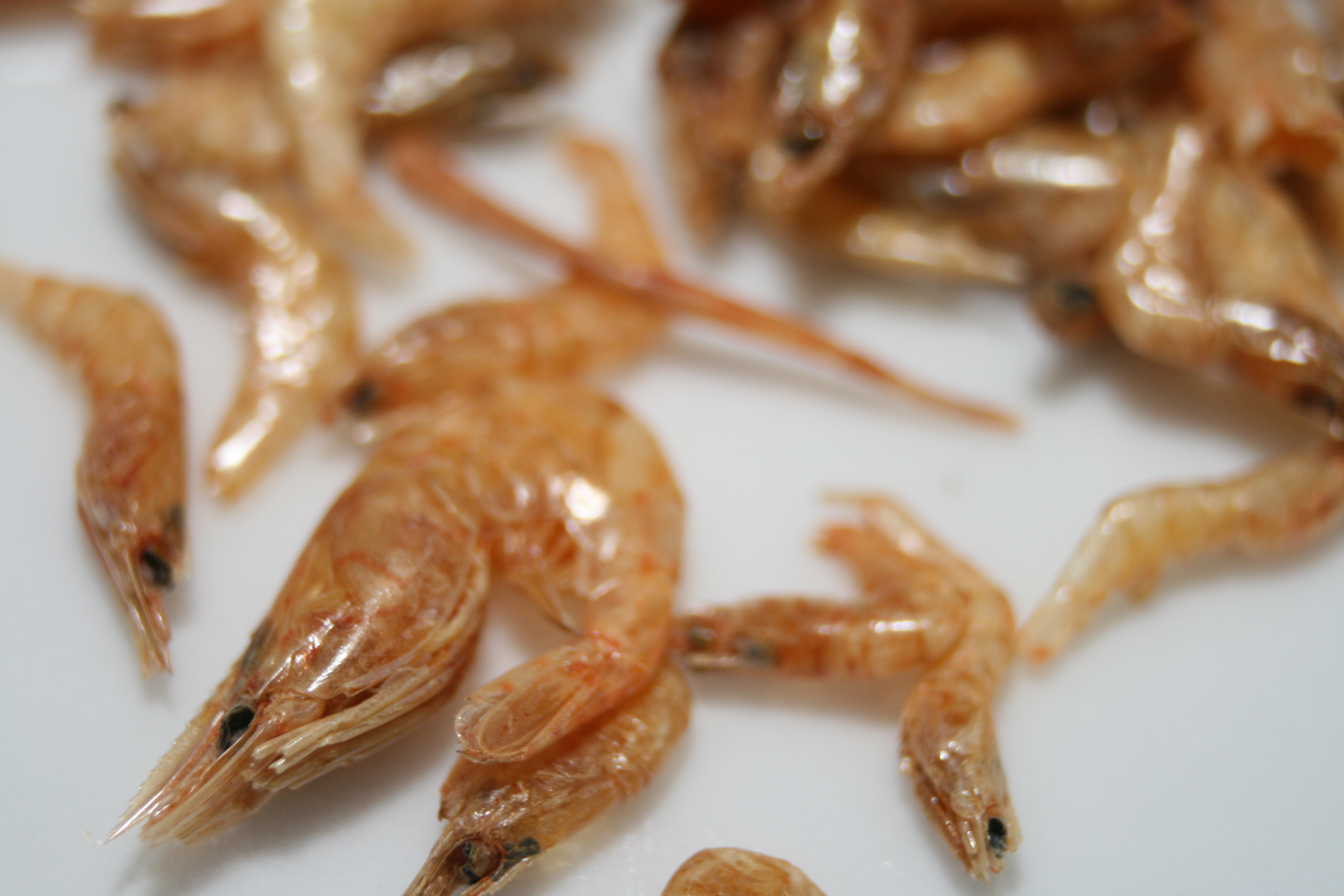

Chinese name
- Traditional Chinese: 蝦米
- Simplified Chinese: 虾米
- Hanyu Pinyin: xiā mǐ
- Jyutping: haa1 mai5
- Literal meaning: shrimp rice
Transcriptions
Standard Mandarin
- Hanyu Pinyin: xiā mǐ
Yue: Cantonese
- Yale Romanization: hā máih
- Jyutping: haa1 mai5
Southern Min
- Hokkien POJ: hê-bí

Vietnamese name
- Vietnamese: tôm khô

Thai name
- Thai: กุ้งแห้ง
- RTGS: kung haeng

Korean name
- Hangul: 마른 새우 / 말린 새우 / 건새우
Transcriptions
- Revised Romanization: mareun saeu / mallin saeu / geonsaeu
- McCune–Reischauer: marŭn saeu / mallin saeu / kŏnsaeu

Indonesian name
- Indonesian: ebi

Khmer name
- Khmer: បង្គាស្ងួត

Dried shrimp are shrimp that have been sun-dried and shrunk to a thumbnail size. They are used in many African, East Asian, Southeast Asian and South Asian cuisines, imparting a unique umami taste. A handful of shrimp is generally used for dishes. The flavors of this ingredient are released when allowed to simmer.

== Use ==
=== East Asia ===
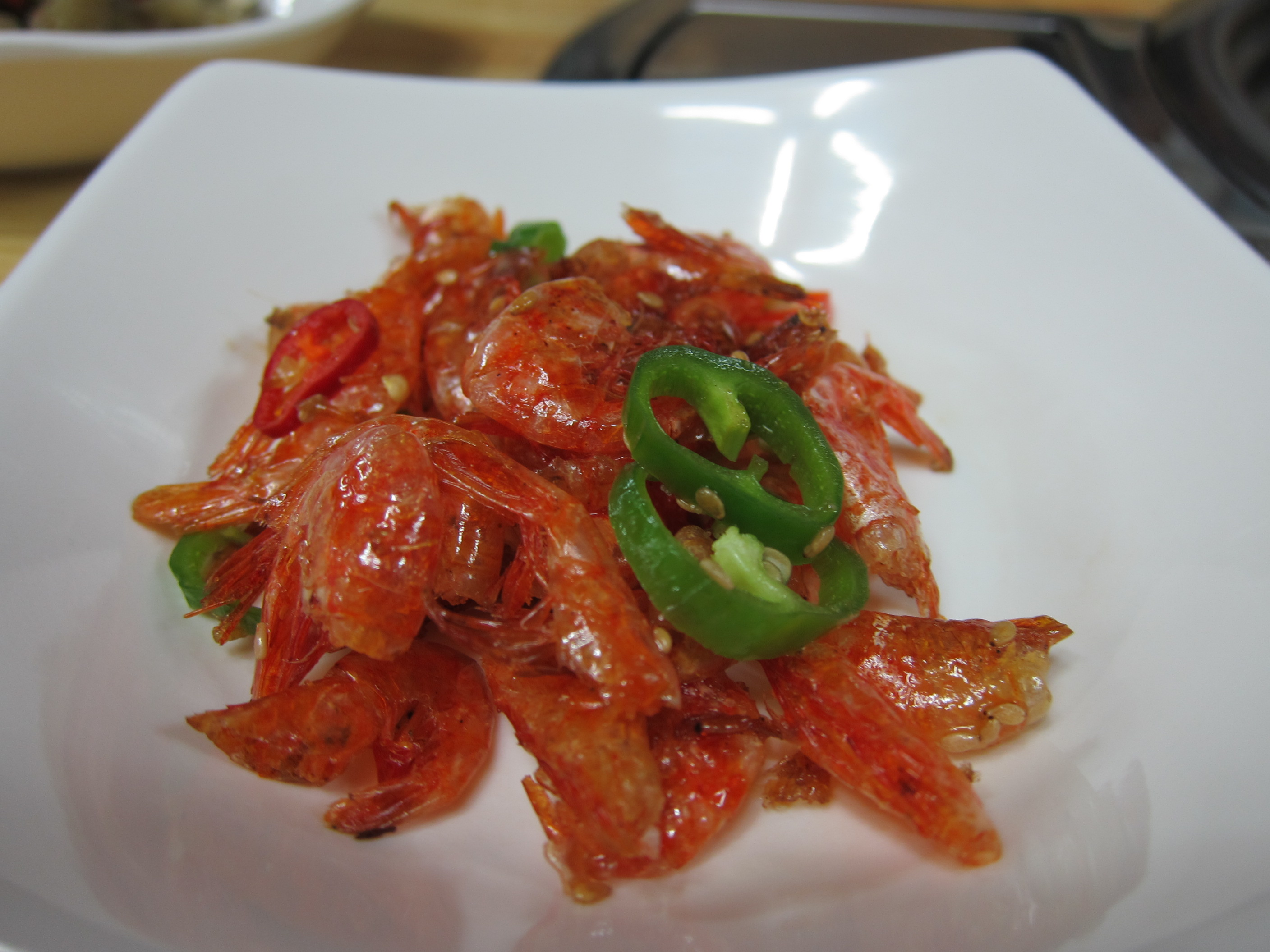
Geon-saeu-bokkeum (stir-fried dried shrimp)

In Chinese cuisine, dried shrimp are used quite frequently for their sweet and unique flavor that is very different from fresh shrimp. It is an ingredient in the Cantonese XO sauce. Dried shrimp are also used in Chinese (mostly Cantonese) soups and braised dishes. They are also featured in Cantonese cuisine, particularly in some dim sum dishes such as rice noodle rolls and zongzi. Despite the literal meaning of the name Chinese name xiā mǐ ("shrimp rice"), it has nothing to do with rice other than the fact that the shrimp are shrunk to a tiny size similar to grains of rice.

Dried shrimp are also used in Korean cuisine. In the dish mareunsaeu bokkeum (Korean: 마른새우볶음), they are soaked briefly, then stir-fried with seasonings—typically garlic, ginger, scallions, soy sauce, sugar, and hot peppers—and served as a side dish. They are also used in some Korean braised dishes (jorim) and for making broth.

=== Southeast Asia ===
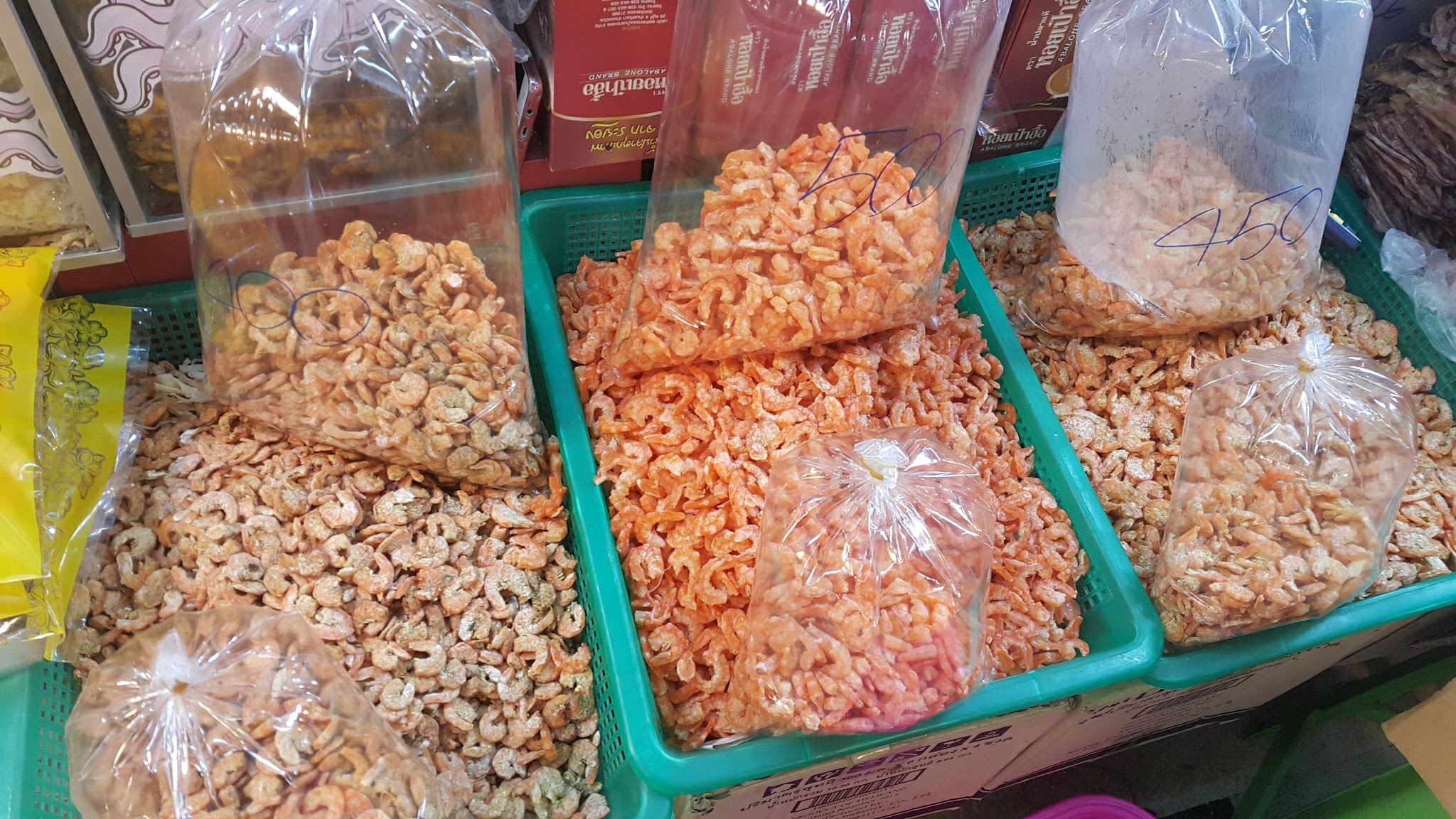
Packages of various dried shrimps in a Thai market

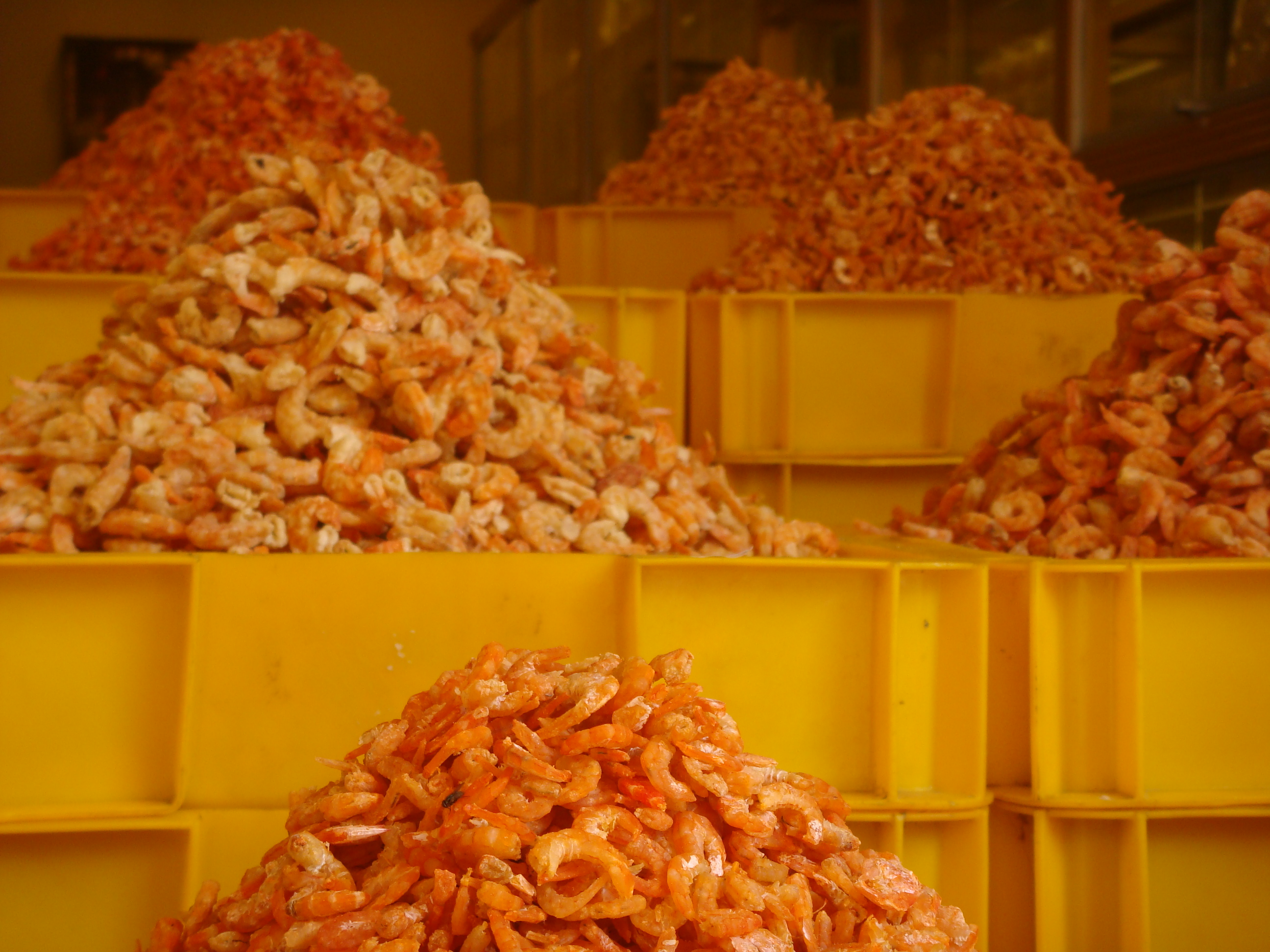
Dried shrimp for sale near Bến Thành Market, Saigon

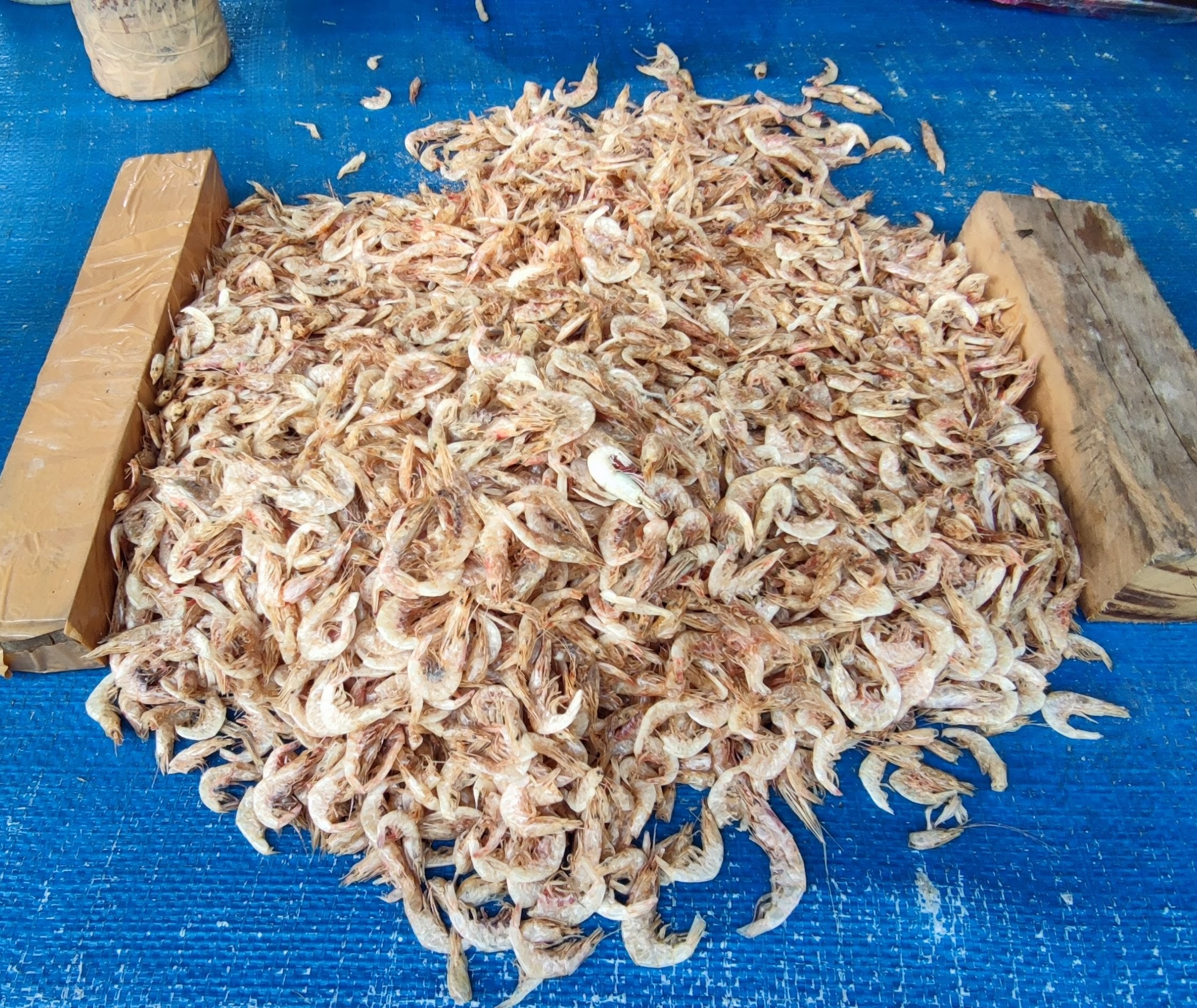
Dried shrimp in Aceh, Indonesia

Dried shrimp are used in Vietnamese cuisine, where they are called tôm khô, and are used in soups, congee, fried rice, or as a topping on stirfries (Mì Xào) or savoury snack items. They are also commonly eaten by themselves as snacks.

In Malaysia, dried shrimp is used in dishes such as sambal udang kering. Dried shrimp is a staple ingredient in the cuisine of Malaysia, with it being a base to rempah, a spice paste that forms the body of many Malay curries.

In Indonesia dried shrimp is called ebi - the name was derived from either Hokkien Chinese, where hê-bí (蝦米) means "dried small shrimp", or the Japanese word ebi (海老/えび), which means "shrimp" (either fresh or dried). Ebi is an important part of Indonesian cuisine as well as Palembang cuisine. It is used in various Indonesian stir fried vegetable dishes, such as stir fried white cabbages with ebi. In Palembang, ebi is boiled, ground and sautéed to make a savoury shrimp powder used as a topping for pempek. Ebi is also used to make shrimp broth, which, along with coconut milk, forms the soup base for mie celor. The ebi powder is also sometimes used as a topping for asinan or rujak.

In Burmese cuisine, dried shrimp is called bazun-chauk and is used widely in various kinds of dishes, such as salads, soups and condiments. It is primarily used along the coast and coastal ethnic minorities' cuisines. Toasted whole dry shrimps are used in a wide variety of Burmese salads such as laphet (fermented tea leaves), tomato and kaffir lime salads. Shredded dried prawns are used to prepare condiments such as ngapi kyaw and balachaung kyaw. Dried shrimp is also used as stock for Burmese thin soups.

Known as kung haeng (กุ้งแห้ง) in Thai cuisine, dried shrimp is used extensively with chilies and Thai herbs to produce various types of chili paste and Thai curry paste. Dried shrimp is also used in salads such as in the Northeastern Thai som tam (green papaya salad).

In the Philippines, dried shrimp is called "hibi/hibe" and is used like salt to season dishes as well as in soup bases such as misua.

=== South Asia ===
In India, it is used in the cuisines of Odisha, Konkan, Andhra, Tamil Nadu and the Northeast region of India. There are several varieties: for example, in Tamil Nadu it is called chenna kunni. In Andhra, it is called endu royya; Nagayalanka in Diviseema is famous for endu royya pappu in Andhra.

- javla, made from a tiny species of shrimp called karandi, which is typically dried head and shell on and consumed whole
- sukat, made from a larger species of shrimp which is typically dried with the head and shell on and consumed after the head and legs are trimmed
- soda, a larger variety which is dried after it is shelled
- It is hydrated and shelled and added to dosakai (type of cucumber) and eggplant dishes. It is also used to flavor rasam or coconut curry in konkan.

In Sri Lanka, dried shrimp is the main component of koonisso mallum also known as pol mallum, a popular dish in the country.

=== Africa ===
It is used in many African countries, like Nigeria, when preparing many dishes involving vegetables - typically cooked in oil with vegetables like spinach, pepper and tomato sauce.

=== Mexico ===
Dried shrimp is commonly found in markets all throughout Mexico, and perhaps their best-known use is in the "meatballs" that accompany the traditional Christmas dish romeritos. Dried shrimp is also used for dried shrimp patties that are cooked in a red sauce with cactus (nopales). This dish is also common around Lent and Christmas time.

=== Brazil ===
The cuisine of Brazil's northeastern region makes extensive use of dried shrimp, where it is called "camarão seco". It is often reconstituted for use in stews or special hot sauces, such as in Acarajé. It may also be ground into a fine powder for use as a condiment, as on Moqueca. At times it is added directly to a dish as an edible garnish.

=== United States ===
Dried shrimp was introduced to the American South in the 18th-century colonial period by thriving Filipino fishers in Saint Malo, which was located in present-day St. Bernard Parish, Louisiana.

In south Louisiana, dried shrimp are often added by Cajun cooks to gumbo to add an intense salty flavor. They can also be eaten as a snack by themselves, and can be commonly found in snack-size portions in south Louisiana's stores.

== See also ==
- Budu
- Conpoy
- Fish sauce
- List of dried foods
- Padaek
- Saeujeot
- Shrimp paste
