= Mie aceh =

Indonesian curried spicy noodle dish

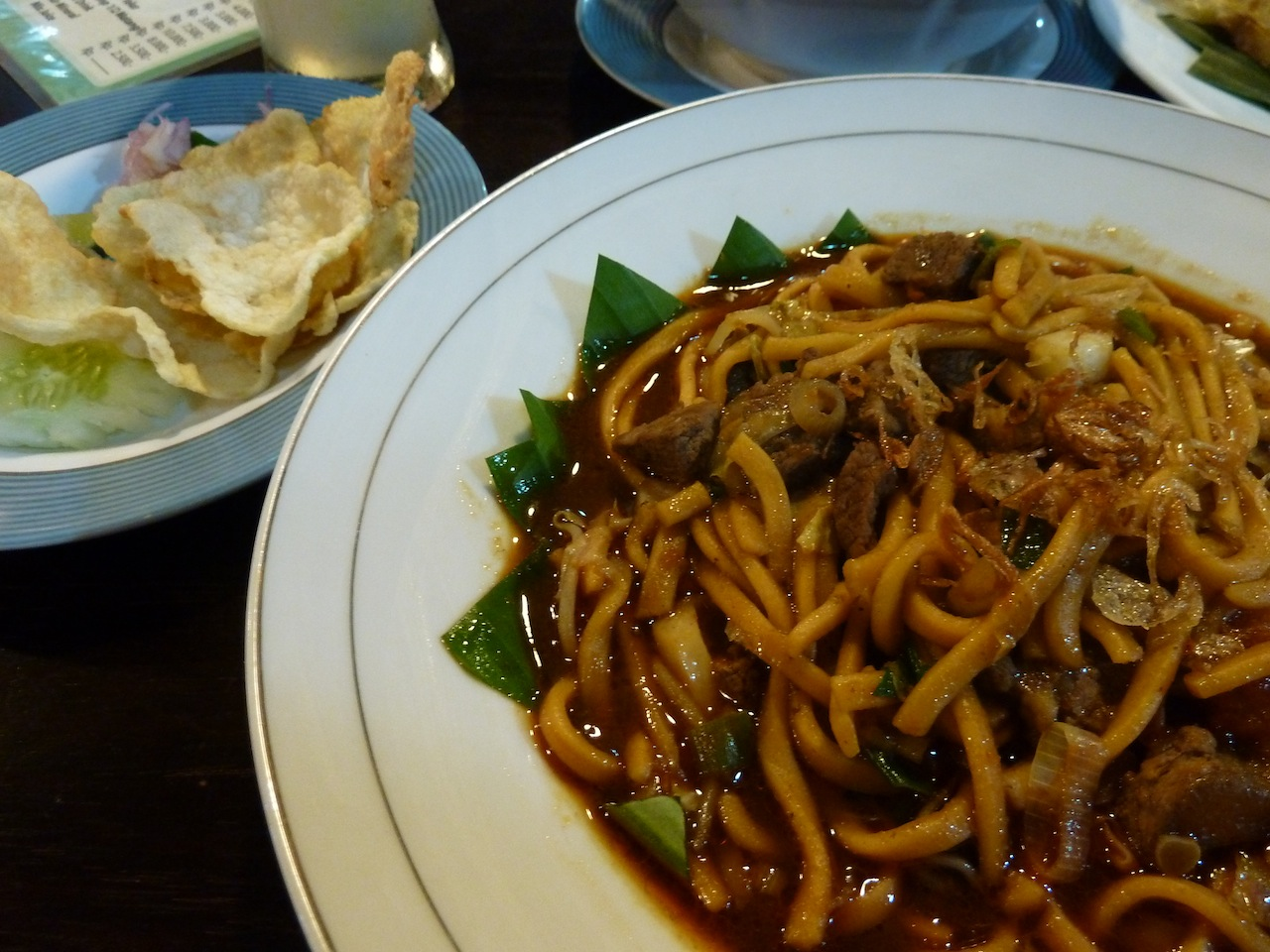
- A plate of mie aceh
- Course: Main course
- Place of origin: Indonesia
- Region or state: Aceh
- Serving temperature: Hot
- Main ingredients: Noodles, meat (goat meat or beef) or seafood (shrimp and fish), curry-like spices, celery, scallion, shallot
- Variations: Mie aceh goreng (fried and dry) and mie aceh kuah (soupy)

Mie aceh or mi aceh ("Aceh noodle") is an Acehnese curried spicy noodle dish.

== Ingredients ==
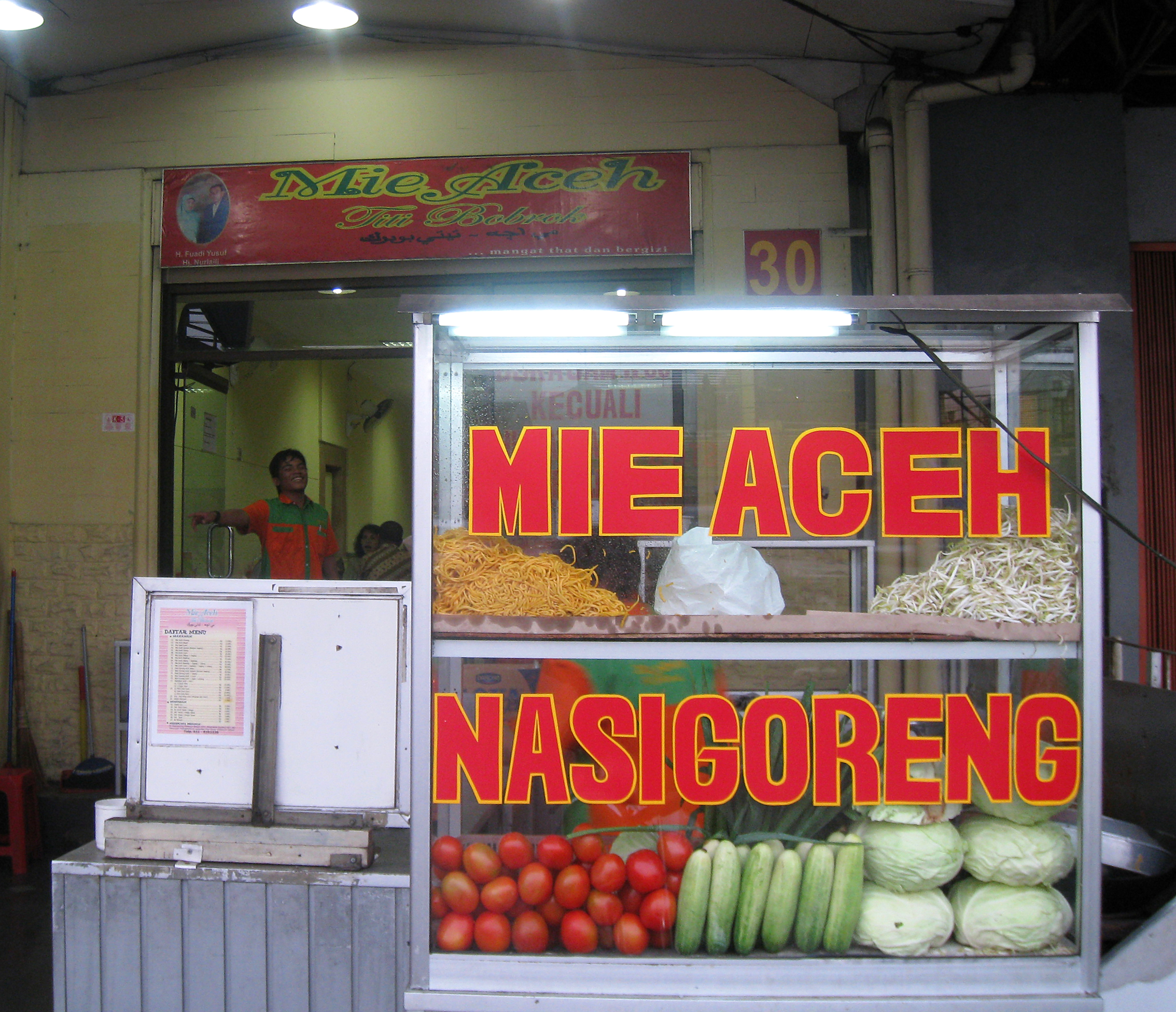
A typical Mie Aceh restaurant. They usually also offer Aceh style nasi goreng

The thick yellow noodles are served with slices of beef, goat meat, lamb, mutton, and seafood, such as shrimp or crab. They are served in rich, hot and spicy curry-like soup. The bumbu spice mixture consist of black pepper, red chili pepper, shallot, garlic, cardamom, caraway, cumin and star anise. The noodle and spices are cooked with bean sprouts, tomato, cabbage and celery. Mie Aceh usually uses thick yellow noodles, in similar size to Japanese udon noodle and Italian spaghetti pasta.

To ensure its authenticity, most of mie Aceh restaurant's noodles are home made.

== History ==
Mie Aceh demonstrates the cultural history of Acehnese people and foreign influences that formed the Aceh region and its historic role as major port in the region. The curry-based soup was an influence of the neighboring Indian cuisine, while the noodle was Chinese influence. The preference to mutton, goat meat and beef demonstrates their Islamic value that requires the food to be halal. While the preference to seafood suggests Aceh geographic location surrounded by Malacca strait, Andaman Sea and Indian Ocean, also the way of life of majority of the Aceh population as traders, farmers and fishermen. Today, mie aceh eating establishments could be found in most of Indonesian major cities, and also neighboring countries such as Malaysia, Singapore, and Australia.

== Variations ==
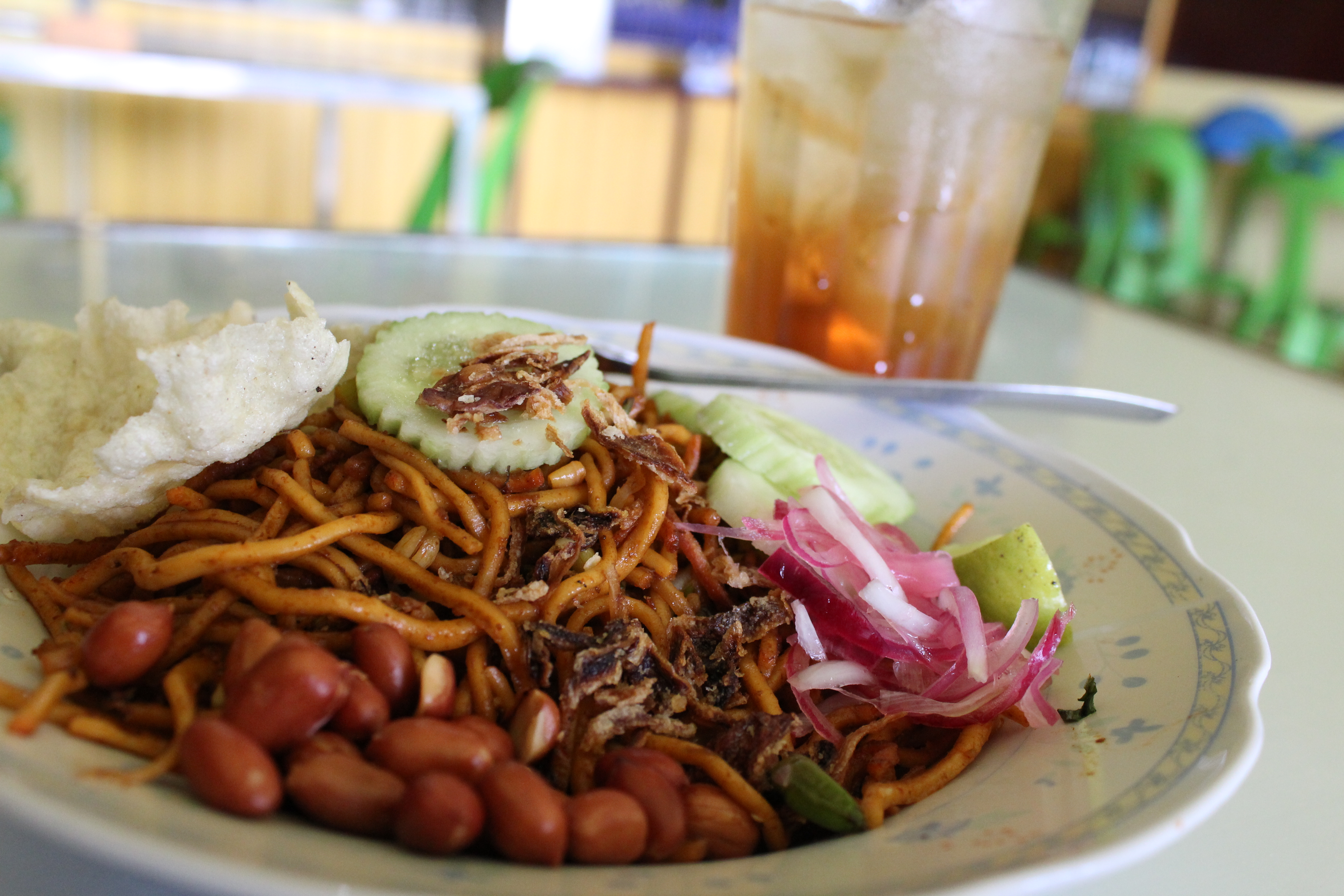
Mie Aceh goreng

Mie Aceh is available in two variations; mie aceh goreng, which is stir-fried and dry, and mie aceh kuah which is soupy. The noodle is also available in two options of ingredients; meat either beef, lamb or mutton, or seafood either shrimp or crab. Aceh noodle is usually sprinkled with fried shallot, and served with emping, peanuts, slices of shallots, cucumber, and dash of kaffir lime.

== See also ==
- Mie caluk
- Mie celor
- Mie goreng
- Mie jawa
- Mie kocok
- Mie gomak
- Mee goreng
- Nasi goreng
- Pad thai
