= Mie celor =

Indonesian noodle soup dish

Mie Celor
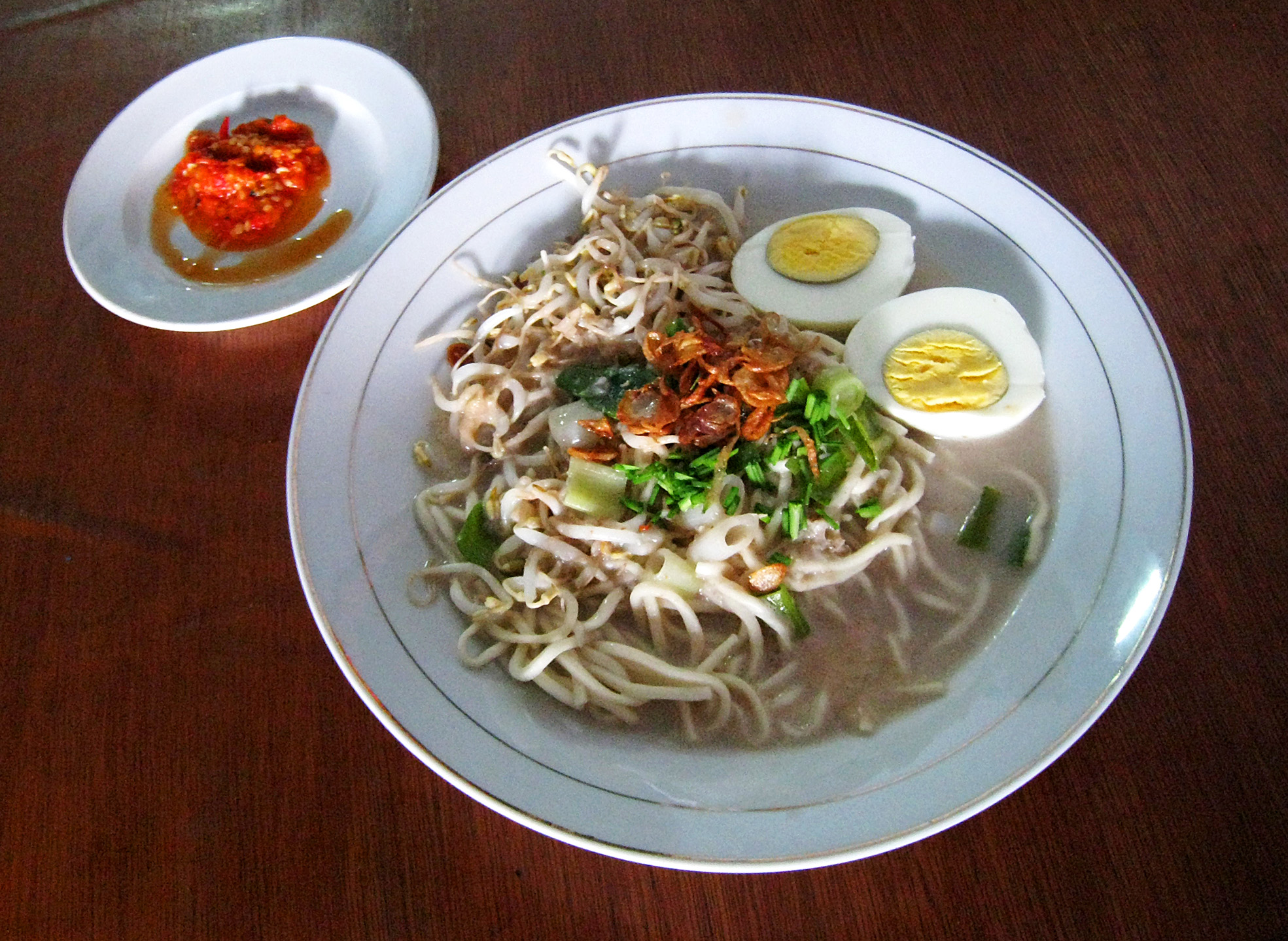
- A plate of mie celor with sambal.
- Course: Main course
- Place of origin: Indonesia
- Region or state: Palembang, South Sumatra
- Serving temperature: Hot
- Main ingredients: Noodle, coconut milk, dried shrimp broth, bean sprouts, egg, celery, scallion, shallot

Mie celor (lit. 'blanched noodle' in Indonesian) is a Southeast Asian noodle soup dish served in a coconut milk and shrimp-based broth, specialty of Palembang city, South Sumatra, Indonesia.

Next to pempek, mie celor is widely associated with Palembang city, despite this noodles might be sold in other cities in Sumatra. Certain restaurants in Palembang specialised on serving and selling this flavourful shrimp noodles with their specific recipe inherited for generations.

== Ingredients ==
It is made from rather large yellow wheat noodles, with the size similar to Japanese buckwheat noodle. The broth can be made from ebi (dried shrimp) or fresh shrimp, cooked in rich coconut milk. The shrimp is the key ingredient that creates the savoury broth. The noodles are served with bean sprouts and hard boiled egg, and sprinkled with sliced fresh celery, scallion and fried shallot.

If the broth was made from some fresh shrimps, the peeled shrimp itself would be the part of the topping. If however dried shrimps are used instead, the ground dried shrimp powder would be sprinkled on top of the noodles. To add spiciness, a separate sambal might be added on the side.

== Etymology ==
In local South Sumatran Malay dialect, celor or celur means showering the ingredients in boiled hot water, in similar fashion as blanching. It refers to the method of softening and cooking the noodle before simmering in coconut milk soup. Today, together with pempek, mie celor has become Palembang's signature dish.

== See also ==
- Pempek
- Mie aceh
- Mie goreng
- Mie kocok
