= Bami =

Bami may refer to:

- Bami, Nepal
- alternative spelling of bammy, a flat and round Jamaican bread made of cassava (yuca) that is soaked in milk or water and fried
- Bakmi
- Bami goreng, an Indonesian noodle dish
- Jah Bami, Trinidadian singer and songwriter
- Ted Bami, British-French boxer
