= Mie bakso =

Indonesian noodle soup

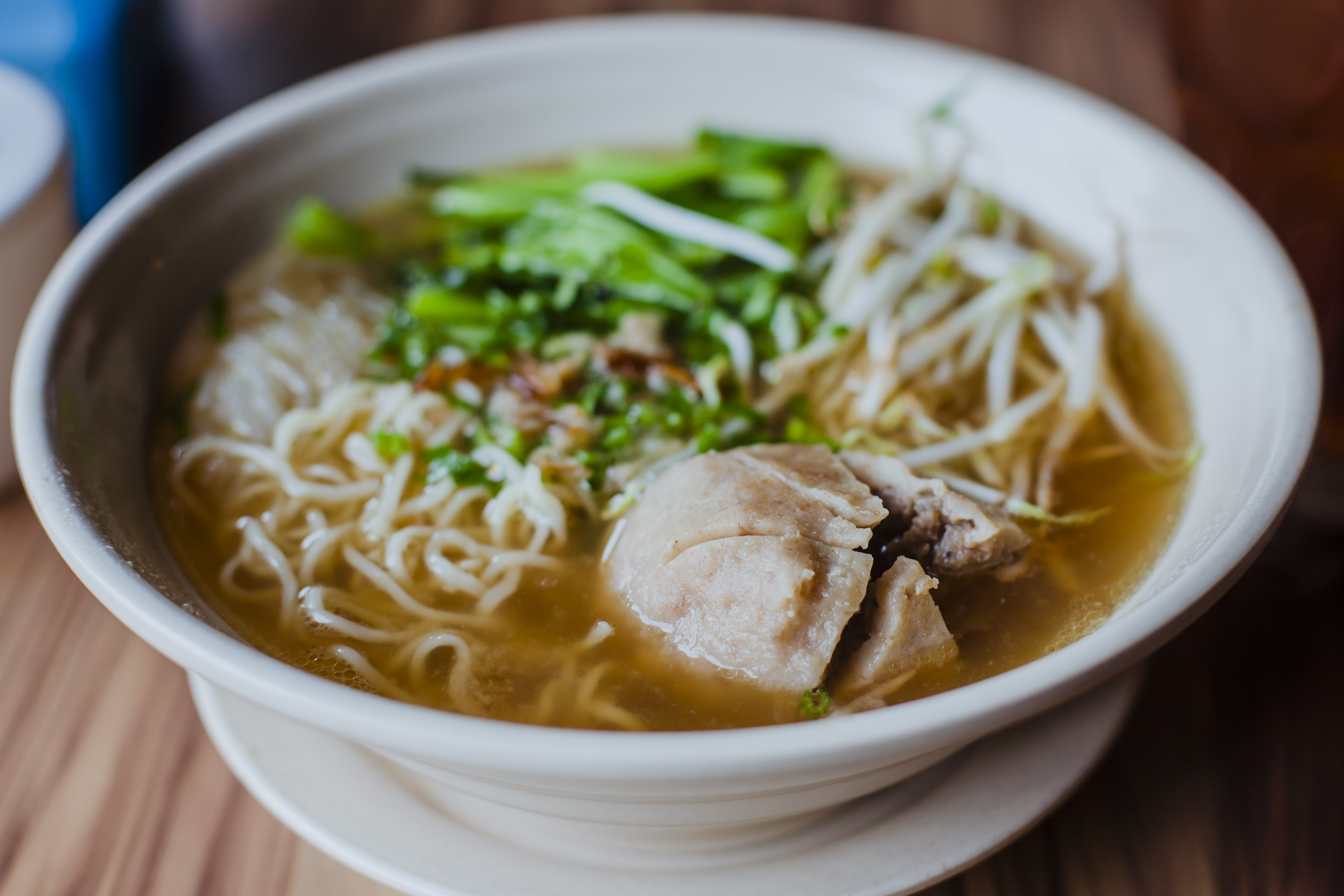
- A bowl of mie bakso
- Alternative names: Mi bakso, mee bakso, bakso mee
- Course: Main course (lunch)
- Place of origin: Indonesia
- Region or state: Nationwide in Indonesia, also popular in neighboring Southeast Asian countries
- Created by: Chinese Indonesians, Javanese and Malays
- Serving temperature: Hot

Mie bakso is an Indonesian noodle soup dish consists of bakso meatballs served with yellow noodles or rice vermicelli. This dish is well known in Chinese Indonesian, Javanese and Malay cuisine. Mie bakso is almost identical with soto mie, only this dish has meatball instead of slices of chicken meat.

Mie bakso can be found all across Indonesia, from street vendors to high-class restaurants. Along with soto, satay and siomay, mie bakso is one of the most popular street foods in Indonesia.

== Etymology ==
The term Mie bakso literally translates to "noodles with meatballs" in Indonesian. The first word, Mie refers to noodles. Bakso means is minced meat or ground meat. In China, Bakso would be shaped into balls and then boiled, giving the meatball shape.

== History ==
Modern mie bakso was first developed by traditions brought by the Hakka Chinese, specifically the Chaoshang region of Guangdong during the late 19th century by introducing beef meatballs. The local people of Chaoshan adopted the beef meatballs and gave the modern springy texture through specialized meat-pounding techniques. These traditions eventually spread to Southeast Asia through Chinese migrations, reaching Indonesia. In Indonesia, they further adopted the dish from the Chaoshan to match local tastes and ingredients. Over time, in Indonesia were the meatballs finally added with noodles.

== Nutrition ==
Mie bakso on average have been found to have 760mg to 790mg of sodium per 100 grams. This poses general health risks regarding cardiovascular health risks and increased blood pressure. Additionally, there is a statistically significant association with mie bakso and poorer sleep quality, but there no proof that the salt content of mie bakso directly causes sleep problems.

== Condiments ==
- Fried shallots, crisp fried shallot sprinkled upon bakso.
- Sweet soy sauce, to add mild sweetness.
- Sambal, chili paste to add spiciness.
- Bottled hot sauce.
- Ketchup, tomato sauce.
- Vinegar, to add sourness.
- Tauge, bean sprouts.
- Tongcay, preserved salted vegetables.

== See also ==
- Cuisine of Indonesia
- Javanese cuisine
- Malay cuisine
- Bakso
- Mie ayam
- Mie soto
- Mie goreng
