= Bakso =

Indonesian meatball dish

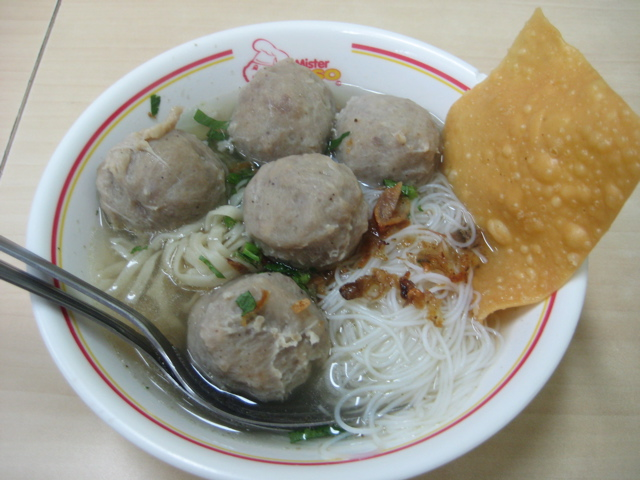
- Bakso served with bihun (rice vermicelli) and fried wontons
- Course: Main
- Place of origin: Indonesia
- Region or state: Nationwide
- Serving temperature: Hot
- Main ingredients: Ground beef, tapioca, noodle, rice vermicelli, beef broth, kailan, celery, salted vegetables, fried shallots
- Variations: Bakwan Malang, phở bò viên (Vietnamese noodle soup with meatballs), Chinese beef balls

Bakso or baso is an Indonesian meatball, or a meat paste made from beef surimi. Its texture is similar to the Chinese beef ball, fish ball, or pork ball. The word bakso may refer to a single meatball or the complete dish of meatball soup. Mie bakso refers to bakso served with yellow noodles and rice vermicelli, while bakso kuah refers to bakso soup served without noodles.

Bakso can be found all across Indonesia, from street vendors to high-class restaurants. Along with soto, satay, and siomay, bakso is one of the most popular street foods in Indonesia. Today, various types of ready-to-cook bakso are also available as frozen foods sold in supermarkets in Indonesia. It is usually eaten with noodles.

== Ingredients, contents, and serving ==
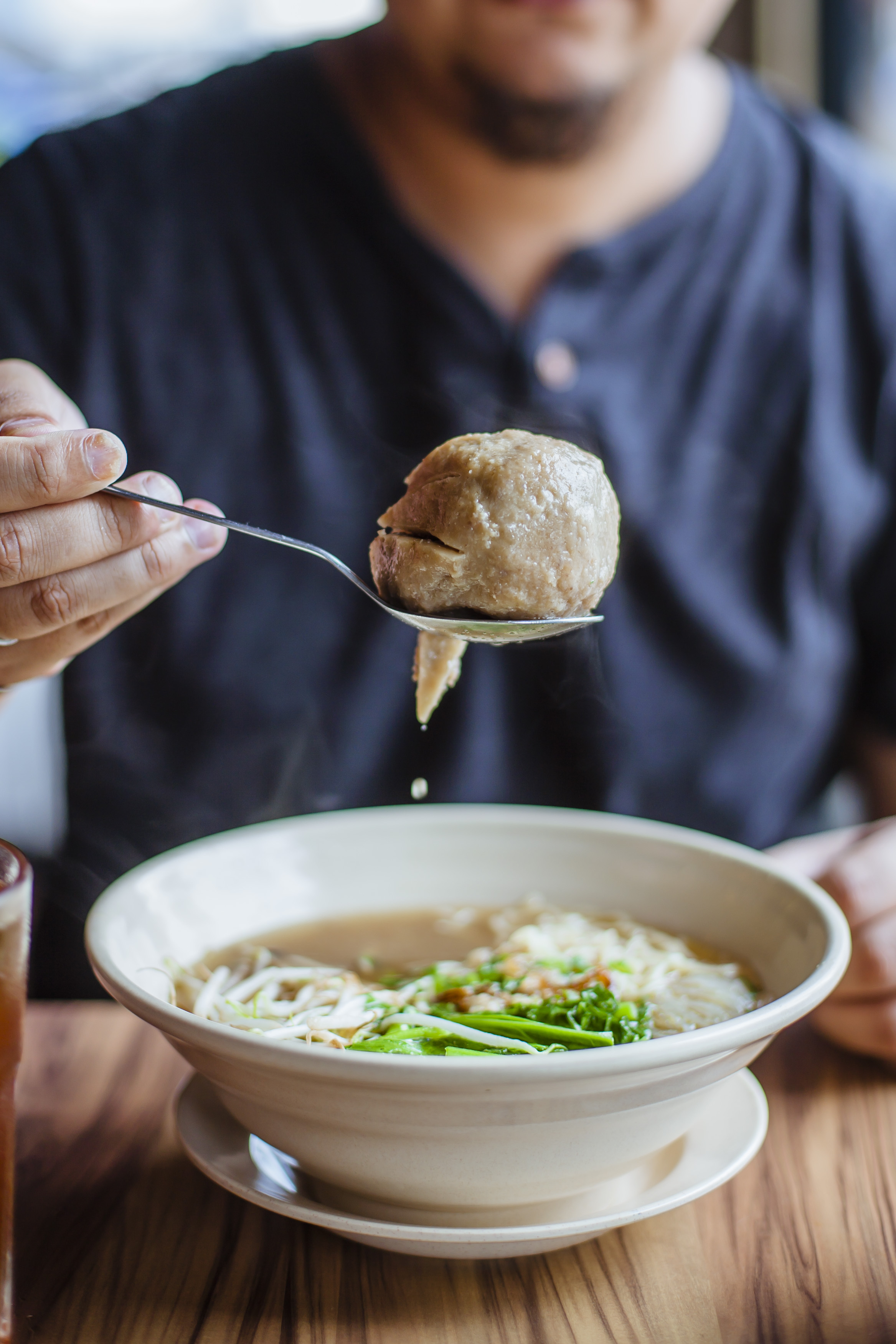
Bakso with noodle and bean sprouts.

Bakso is commonly made from finely ground beef with a small quantity of tapioca flour and salt. However, bakso can also be made from other ingredients, such as chicken, pork, fish, or shrimp. Unlike other meatball recipes, bakso has a consistent firm, dense, homogeneous texture due to the polymerization of myosin in the beef surimi.

As most Indonesians are Muslims and observe halal dietary laws, bakso is usually made from beef, chicken, or a mixture of beef and chicken. In non-Muslim majority areas, such as in the Chinatowns of major cities and on the Hindu-majority island of Bali, pork bakso might be found.

Traditionally the beef surimi paste or dough is made into balls by hand and boiled in hot water. After the meat is done, the meatballs are dried and served or refrigerated for later use. Pre-cooked bakso are usually displayed in the windows of street vendor carts.

Bakso is usually served in a bowl of beef broth, with yellow noodles, bihun (rice vermicelli), salted vegetables, tofu, egg (wrapped within bakso), Chinese broccoli, bean sprout, siomay or steamed meat dumpling, and crisp wonton, sprinkled with fried shallots and celery. Slices of bakso are often used and mixed as complements in mie goreng, nasi goreng, or cap cai recipes.

== Origin ==
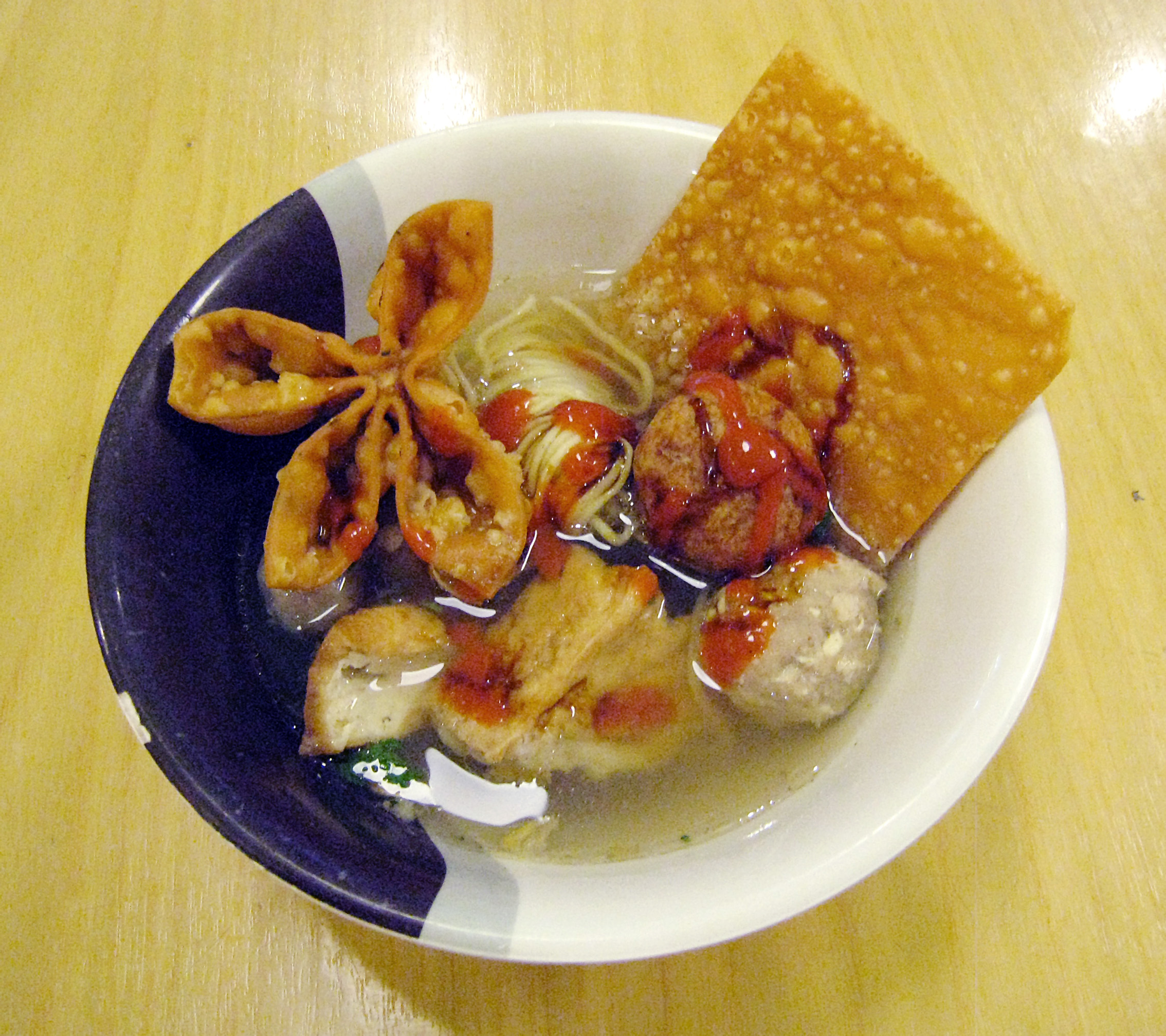
Bakso Malang.

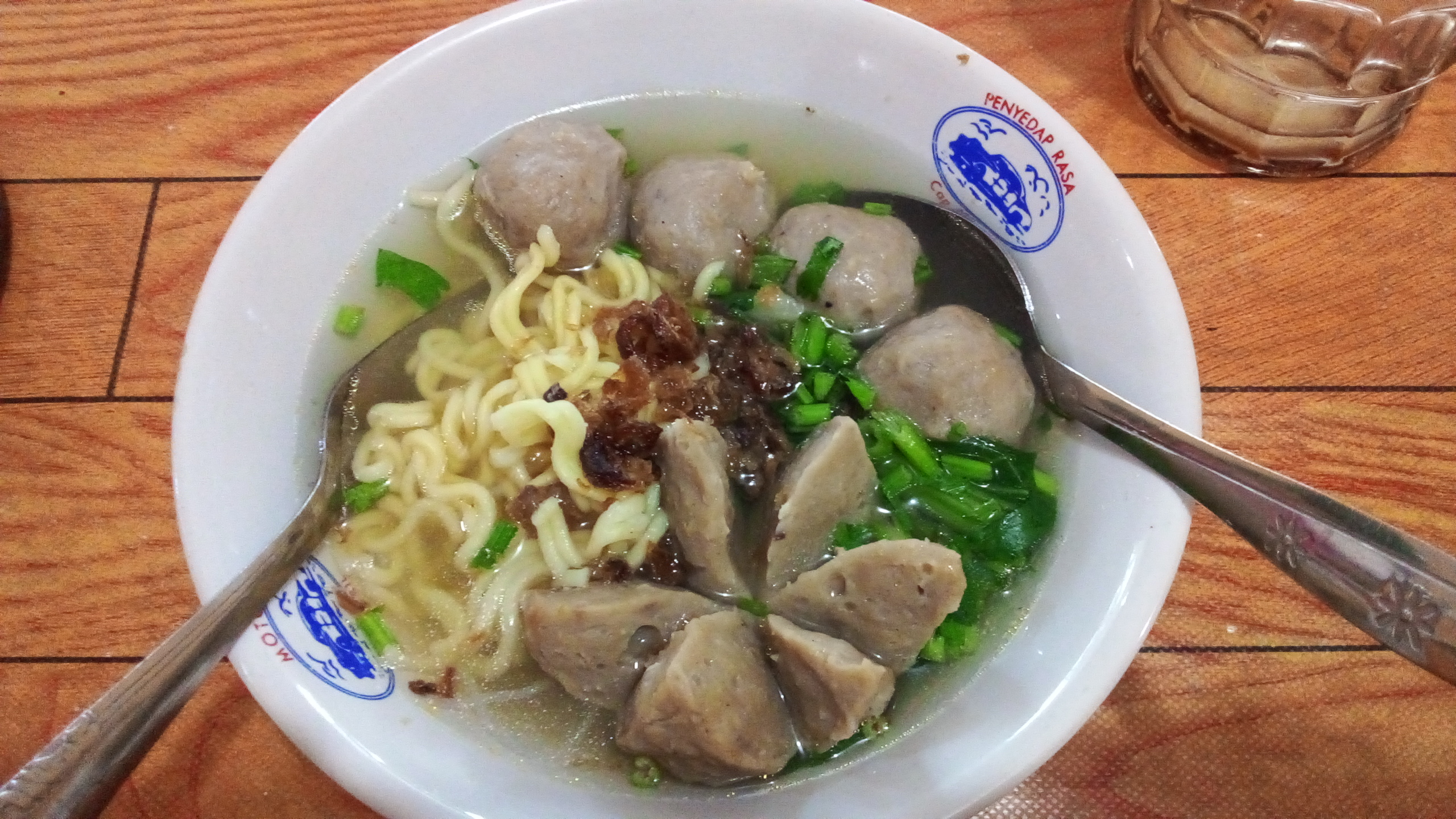
Bakso Solo and Wonogiri.

The name bakso originated from bak-so (肉酥, Pe̍h-ōe-jī: bah-so͘), the Hokkien pronunciation for "fluffy meat" or "minced meat". This suggests that bakso has Indonesian Chinese cuisine origin. Chinese influence is apparent in Indonesian food, such as bakmi, mie ayam, pangsit, mie goreng, kwetiau goreng, bakso, and lumpia. Indeed, bakso texture is quite similar to Chinese beef balls, which are quite fluffy and have a homogenous texture. Although bakso has a Chinese Hokkien origin name, culinary experts suggest that it is likely that bakso was a mixture of culinary influences back in the colonial Dutch East Indies. Also in Indonesian, the term bola daging often refers to the Western or European style of meatballs, which is different in texture and elasticity compared to bakso. For example, Swedish meatballs are translated as bola daging Swedia in Indonesian. The soup and the noodles probably originated in China, but the meatball may have come from the Dutch, who colonized Indonesia in the 19th century.

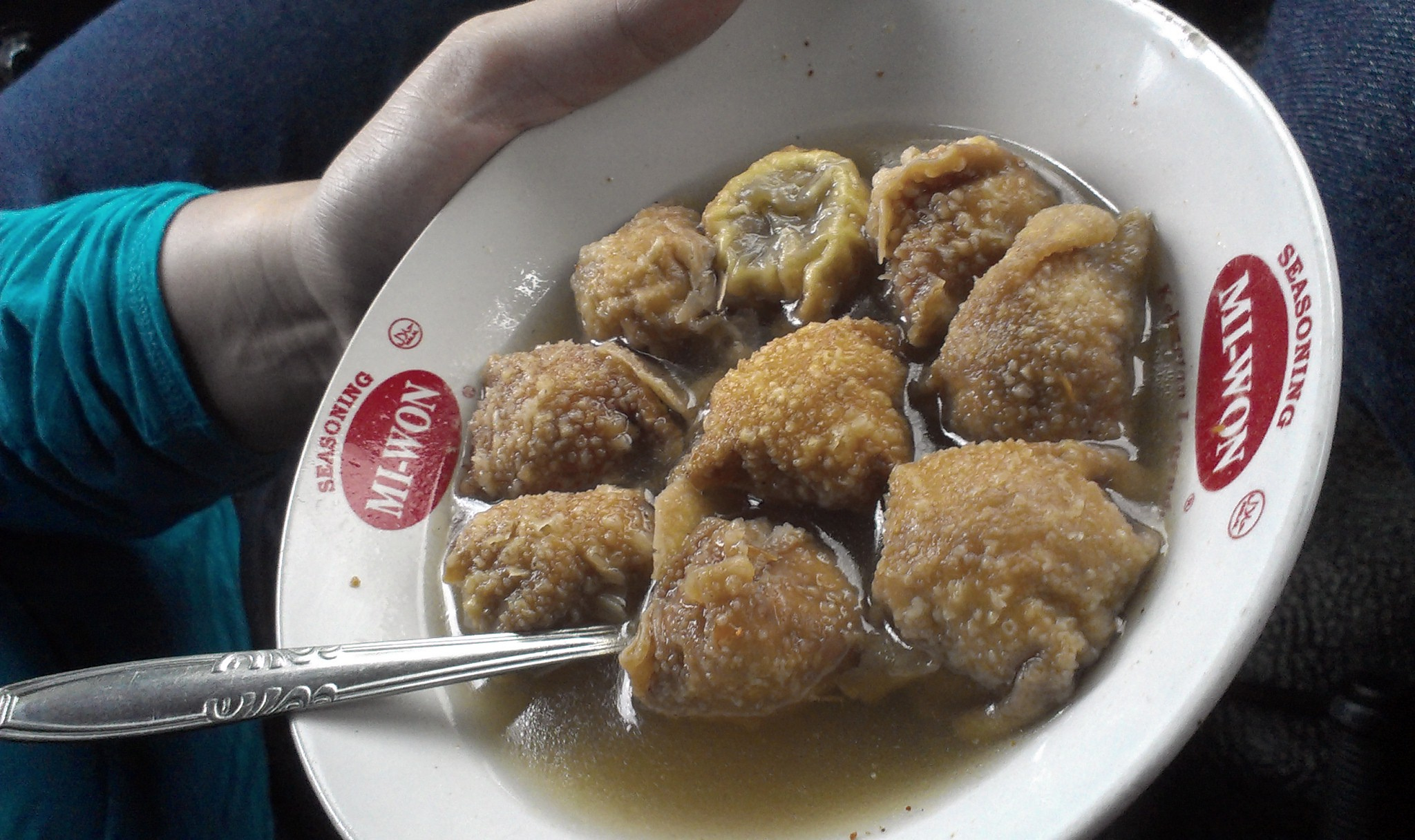
Bakso cuanki from Bandung.

Despite its possible Chinese origin, bakso seems to have undergone localization, especially into Chinese Indonesian and Javanese cuisine. Today, most of the bakso vendors are native Javanese from Wonogiri (a town near Solo) and Malang. Bakso Solo and Bakso Malang are the most popular variants; the name comes from the city it comes from, Solo in Central Java and Malang in East Java. Bakso Solo is usually served with yellow noodles and rice vermicelli in beef broth, while Bakso Malang usually is enriched with tofu and crispy fried wonton. In Malang, bakso bakar (roasted bakso) is also popular.

In Bandung, West Java, there is a type of bakso called bakso cuanki, which is similar to bakso Malang. It can contain various types of bakso ingredients; such as bakso aci, siomay dumpling, boiled wonton, fried wonton, and fried bakso, served with scallion and broth soup.

== Variations ==
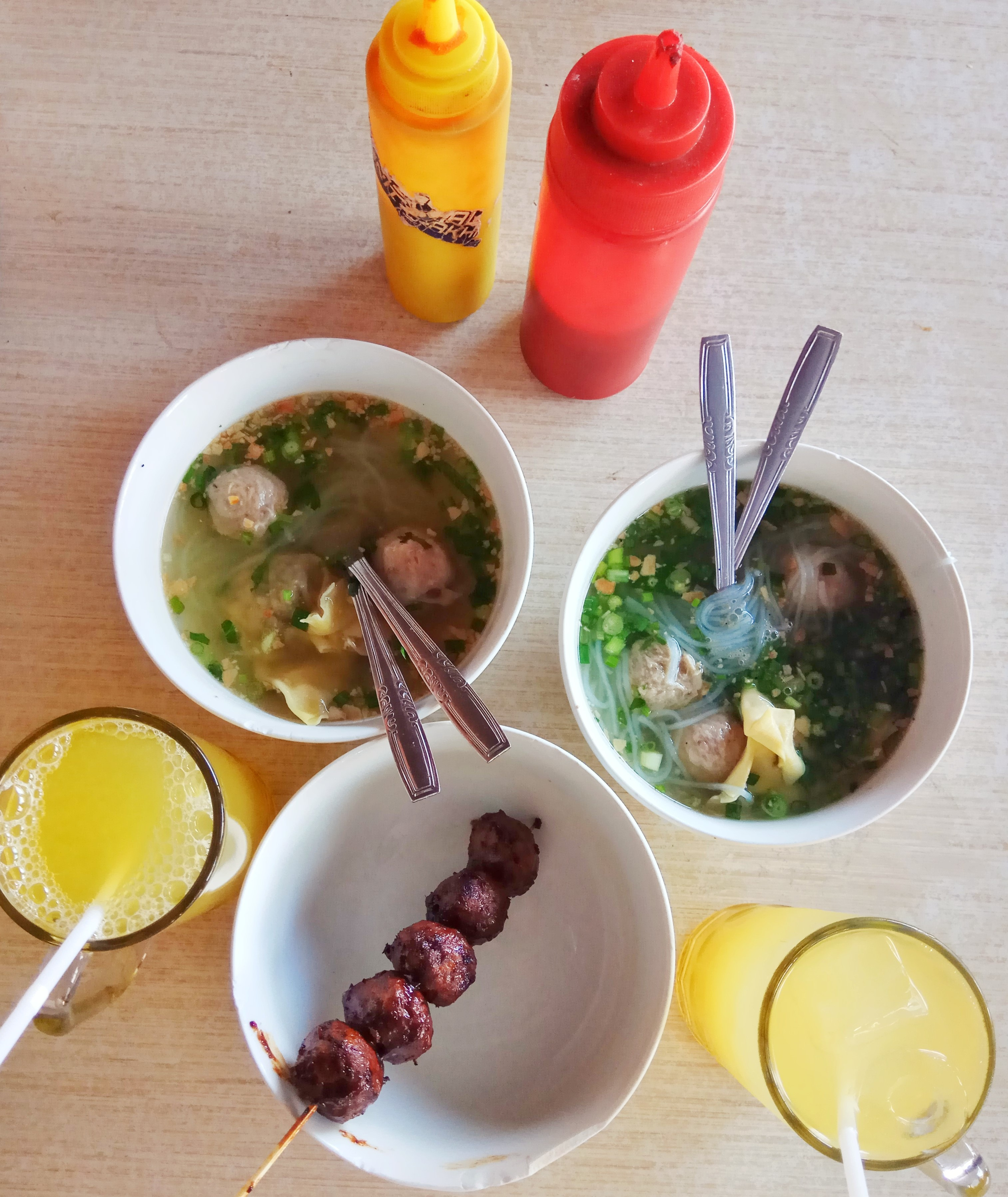
Bakso bakar, grilled and skewered bakso.

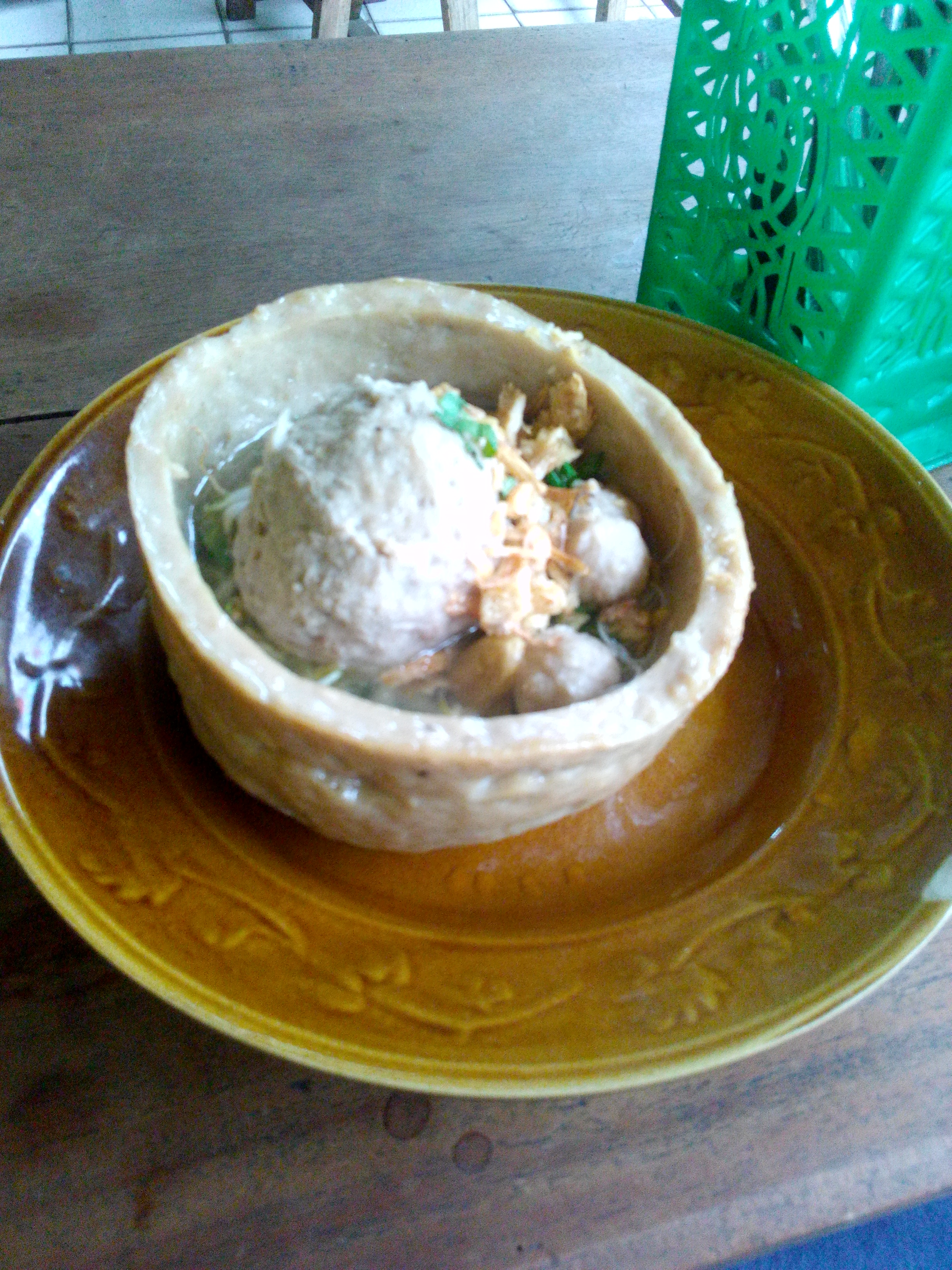
Bakso beranak, small baksos inside a bigger bakso.

Indonesia has developed numerous bakso variants, usually differing in shape, size, texture, ingredients, and fillings.

- Bakso aci: meatball with a higher tapioca content
- Bakso ayam: chicken bakso
- Bakso babi: pork meatball
- Bakso bakar: grilled and skewered bakso, prepared to satay
- Bakso beranak: big meatball filled with small meatballs
- Bakso bola tenis tennis ball-sized bakso, either filled with hard-boiled egg as bakso telur or filled with tetelan which includes pieces of spare beef meat and fat or urat (tendon).
- Bakso cirawang: bakso made of cartilage, tapioca, and garlic. It is from Garut.
- Bakso cuanki: a famous bakso from Bandung, West Java made with either mackerel or shrimp.
- Bakso gepeng: flat beef bakso, usually has a finer and more homogenous texture
- Bakso goreng: fried bakso with a rather hard texture, usually consumed solely as a snack or mixed in one bowl as part of bakso Malang or bakso cuanki
- Bakso gulung: long bakso wrapped in tofu skin.
- Bakso iga/rusuk: short ribs bakso.
- Bakso ikan: fish bakso (fish ball). In Karimunjawa, there is a bakso dish made of caesionidae meat and called bakso ikan ekor kuning. In West Lampung Regency, bakso ikan blue marlin made of marlin, is a common bakso dish. Bakso kakap or snapper bakso dish is scattered in the city of Semarang. In Malingping District of Lebak Regency, bakso ikan is made of skipjack tuna or mackerel.
- Bakso jamur, mushroom bakso
- Bakso keju: a modern variant of bakso, filled with either cheddar or mozzarella cheese
- Bakso kotak: cube-shaped bakso
- Bakso krikil: small meatballs like gravel have become a bakso dish in Magelang.
- Bakso kriwil: curly-shaped bakso.
- Bakso lobster: Spiny lobster wrapped in bakso dough.
- Bakso lohoa: made from minced chicken meat and prawn mixed with soun noodles, mushrooms, and vegetable pieces.
- Bakso Malang: bakso dish from the city of Malang in East Java; complete with noodles, tofu, siomay, and fried wontons
- Bakso mercon: lit. "firecracker bakso", refer to an extra hot and spicy bakso filled with sambal made of chilli pepper and birds eye chili pepper
- Bakso nyuknyang: bakso dish from Makassar, South Sulawesi. It is eaten with burasa and a squeeze of calamansi. Halal versions may substitute pork for beef.
- Bakso rusa: venison meatball. A delicacy of Merauke Regency.
- Bakso selimut: egg-wrapped bakso.
- Bakso tahu: bakso meat dough filled into tofu
- Bakso taichan: bakso with sour and super spicy soup.
- Bakso telur: a tennis ball-sized bakso with hard-boiled chicken egg wrapped inside
- Bakso tumpeng: cone-shaped bakso
- Bakso udang: shrimp bakso with a slightly pink color
- Bakso uleg: spicy bakso from Temanggung. Some chilies are ground in a bowl before the meatballs and soup are poured in.
- Bakso urat: bakso filled with tendons and coarse meat

== Condiments ==
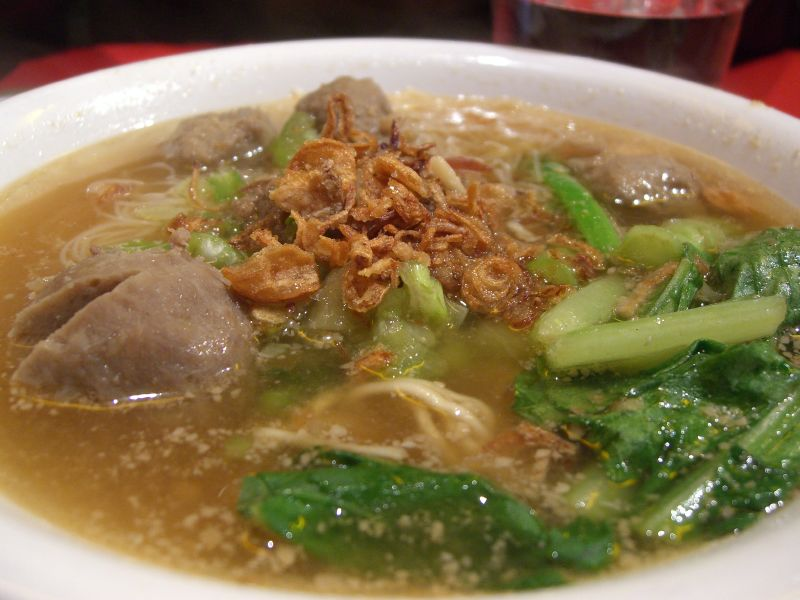
Bakso garnished with bawang goreng fried shallot.

Bakso stalls usually served bottles of sauces, condiments, additions, and garnishing. Clients may add these condiments according to their personal preferences. The following condiments and accompaniments are often added to a bowl of bakso:

- Bawang goreng crisp fried shallot sprinkled upon bakso
- Kecap manis or sweet soy sauce, to add a mild sweetness
- Sambal chili paste to add spiciness
- Bottled hot sauce
- Ketchup tomato sauce
- Vinegar to add sourness
- Tongcay preserved salted vegetables

== Popularity ==
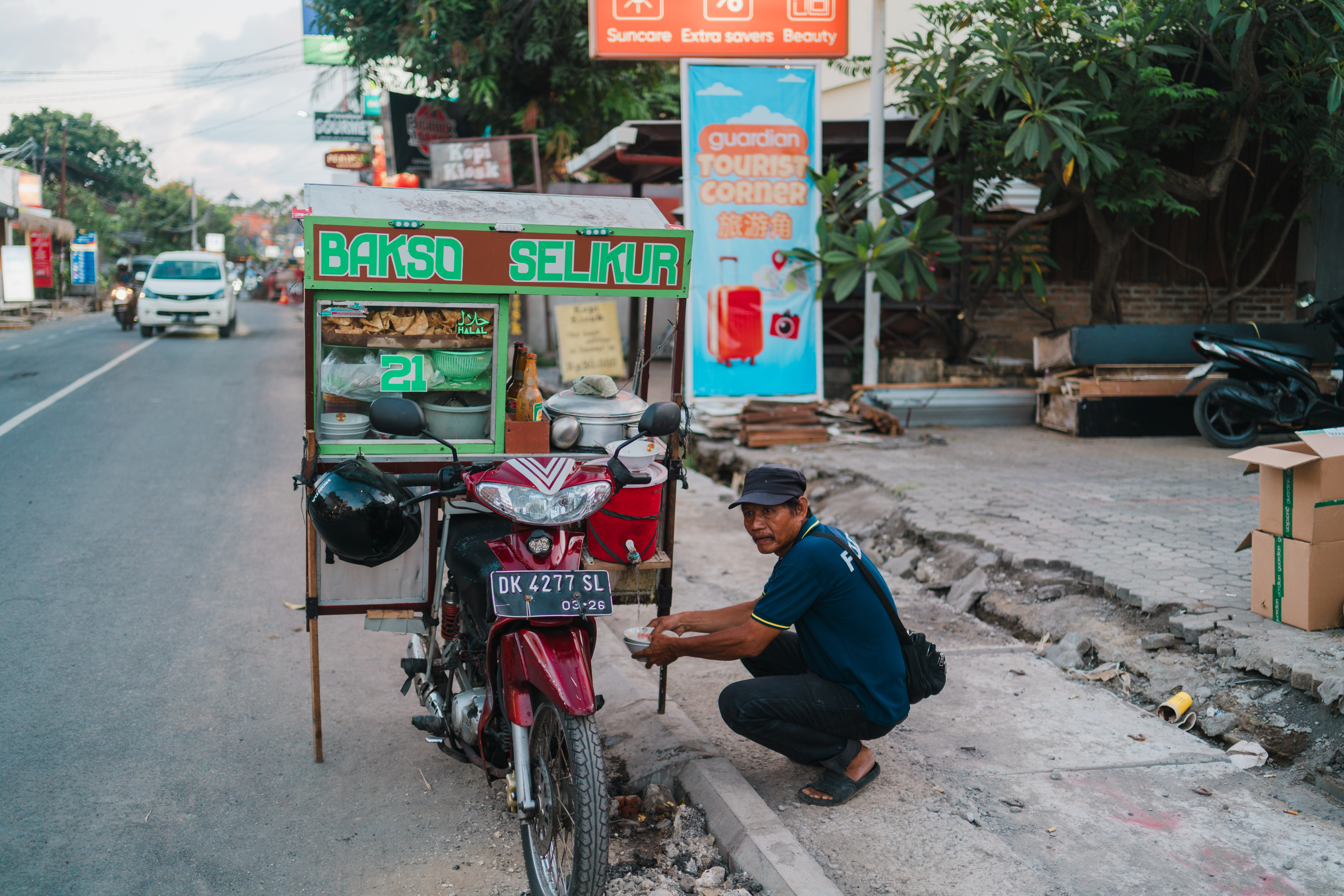
Bakso vendor in Sanur, Bali

Bakso is one of the most popular street foods in Indonesian cities and villages alike. Travelling street vendors, either by carts or bikes are often frequenting residential areas in Indonesia, while bakso warung and humble tent food stalls are often sprung on street sides in Indonesian cities. Bakso came to international attention when United States President Barack Obama remembered it as one of his favourite foods from his childhood in Indonesia, and mentioned it in his speech. It was also part of a task in The Amazing Race Asia 1, The Amazing Race Australia 1 and The Amazing Race 28 where teams had to either sell and/or eat bakso.

The traveling meatball vendor is often associated with intelligence undercover activity. On social media, there are also many memes depicting meatball vendors communicating through walkie-talkies. According to Ridlwan Habib, an intelligence observer, the profession of mobile food traders such as meatball workers is often used by members of the Detective or Densus 88 to spy on terrorist activities or other suspicious criminal activities.

== Similar dishes ==
Similar meatball dishes can be found in other Southeast Asian cuisines, such as those in Thailand, Vietnam, Malaysia, and Singapore, as well as Chinese-style meatballs.

The dish is also similar to Vietnamese noodle soup with meatballs, phở bò viên. In Vietnam, Phở means noodle soup while Bò Viên is meatballs. Phở Bò Viên is one of the versions of Pho dishes in Vietnam. It has been considered as the national dish of Vietnam.

In Malaysia and Singapore, there is a similar meatball soup called bebola daging, which is a Malay translation of "meatball". Many recipes of bebola daging in Malaysia and Singapore are derived from either Western (Indian or European) or Eastern (Chinese) meatballs, such as bebola daging Masala which is derived from Indian cuisine influence.

In the Philippines, meatballs are called almondigas or bola-bola, and are usually served in a misua noodle soup with toasted garlic, squash, and pork cracklings. Bola-bolas are also stewed or pan-fried until golden brown.

== See also ==
- Chinese Indonesian cuisine
- List of meatball dishes
- Boat noodles
- Mie ayam
- Mie bakso
- Mie kocok
- Swedish meatballs
