= Jah Bami =

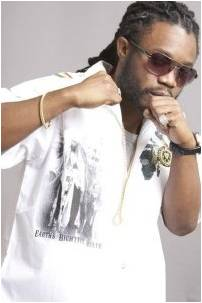
- Headshot in 2009

Background information
- Birth name: Damian Marvin Walters
- Born: January 13, 1979
- Origin: Trinidad and Tobago
- Genres: Reggae, Soca, Hip Hop
- Occupation(s): Singer, songwriter, vocalist
- Years active: 1999 –present

Damian Marvin Walters was born in 1979 in Trinidad and Tobago. He is known to his fans as Jah Bami meaning ‘Jah Take Me’, an influential entertainer, vocalist and song writer. His musical style is a mix between reggae and soca pulling influence from hip-hop and R&B. Jah Bami's sound and personality has taken him around the world and back as a host for Viacom's, MTV Caribbean network MTV Tempo.

== Early years ==
His musical life began at the age of six, as the lead choirboy in his family's church. As a youth the steel drum played a major role in his musical upbringing, as he watched his fathers group tour Trinidad as the first steelpan. Jah Bami grew up listening to entertainers such as Anita Baker, Cameo and Prince. He recalls watching his father DJ at clubs in Trinidad and seeing him perform on the microphone.

In his teens he gained recognition for his talents on the steel drum teaching himself how to play by ear. He mastered instruments including the guitar, piano, and drums, which later helped him organize full orchestra ensembles. At age 17 he earned himself a music scholarship at the University of the West Indies where he led his school to become school Panorama Champions. Jah Bami also played with the “Exodus Steel Orchestra” which was National Panorama Champions four years in a row.

He spent most of his youth living between New York City and Trinidad visiting his father, who had moved to the States. In 2000 he made his official move to New York, making Brooklyn his home. During his time in New York he began to embrace Rastafari and a Japanese label Thello Entertainment recognized his sound and performance style.

== Musical career ==
Thello Entertainment invited him to join them on a yearlong Japanese tour alongside other reggae stars including Wayne Wonder and Ky-Mani Marley (son of Bob Marley). It was during his time in Japan that his welcome embrace by the Japanese spawned a style they deemed ‘Mutant Chant’ for his evolving sound. His Japanese fans created his name Jah Bami.

Upon his return to the United States, Jah Bami was invited to the leading radio station in New York ‘Hott 97’ and interviewed by Massive B, a world-renowned radio host and station producer Bobby Konder. Jah Bami is known for his relationship with reggae Rastafarian lifestyle apparel brand "Color Heritage" as the official face and spokesman for the company. He continues to grow his success, producing chart-topping hits in the United States, Asia, Europe, and the Caribbean.

Jah Bami has recorded and shared the stage with industry legends including Wu Tang Clan, Norris Man and Damian Marley.
