= Mie ayam =

Indonesian chicken noodle dish

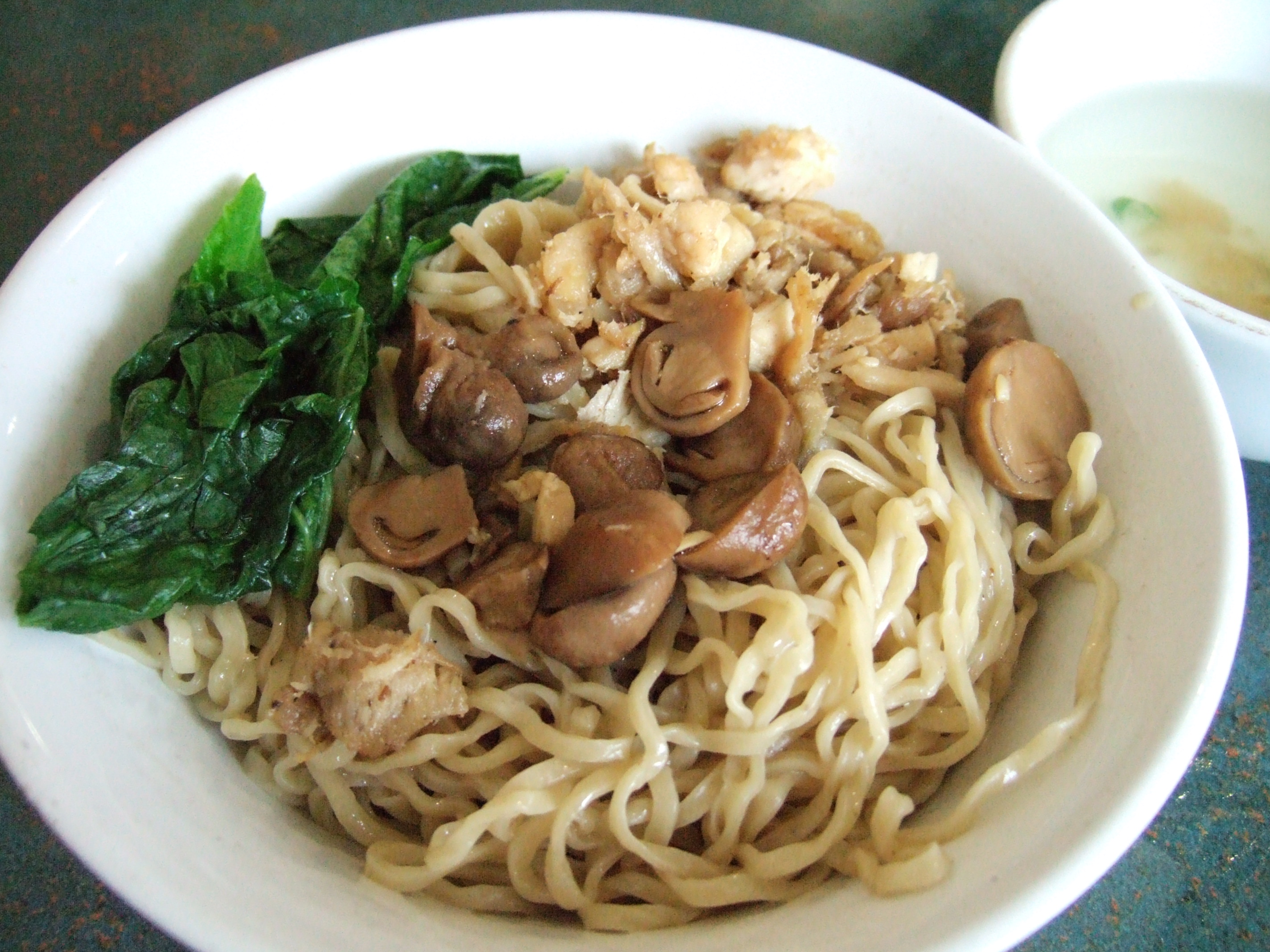
- Mie ayam with mushrooms, Chinese cabbage and chicken broth.
- Alternative names: Mi ayam cincang, bakmi ayam, Chicken noodles
- Course: Main course
- Place of origin: Indonesia
- Region or state: Nationwide
- Associated cuisine: Indonesia
- Serving temperature: Hot
- Main ingredients: Noodle, chicken meat, soy sauce, garlic, cooking oil (from chicken fat or vegetable oil), chicken broth, Chinese cabbage, scallions
- Food energy (per serving): 1 bowl of mie ayam contains 500 calories.

Mie ayam, mi ayam, or bakmi ayam (Indonesian for 'chicken bakmi', literally 'chicken noodles') is a common Indonesian dish of seasoned yellow wheat noodles topped with diced chicken meat (ayam). It is derived from culinary techniques employed in Chinese cuisine. In Indonesia, the dish is recognized as a popular Chinese Indonesian dish, served by restaurants, street-side warung, and travelling vendor carts frequenting residential areas.

== History ==
Mie ayam is inseparable from bakmi noodles as the main ingredient, which derives from Chinese noodles. It is known Chinese people and their Indonesian descendants have lived in the Indonesian archipelago since at least the 13th century, so there are food acculturations between Chinese food and local ingredients and culture in Indonesia, one of which is in Java.

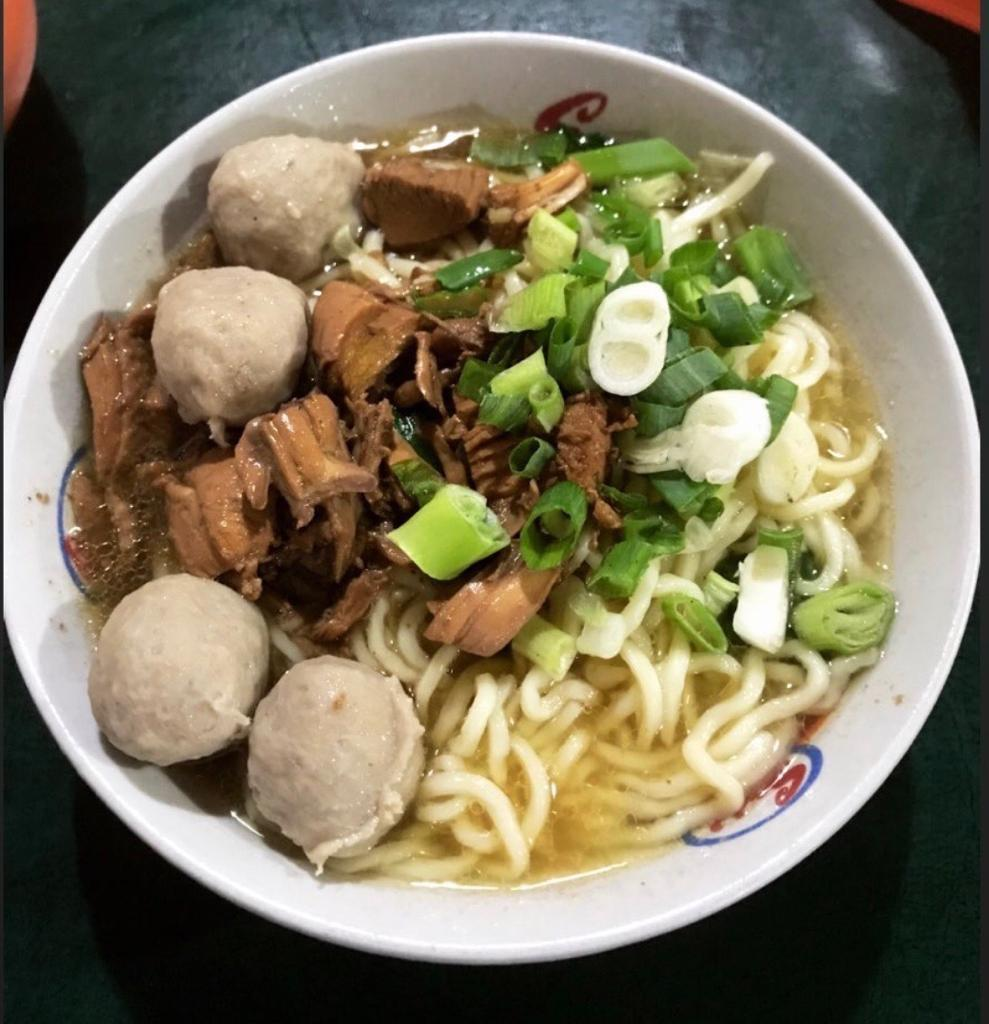
Wonogiri-style noodle soup mie ayam.

One of the centers of mie ayam in Java is Wonogiri and is often called the capital of mie ayam. According to Hery Priyatmoko, the beginning of Wonogiri-style mie ayam is related to bakmi as a noodle dish that was popular in Solo's Chinatown area, Pasar Gede. This is evidenced by the large number of ethnic Chinese selling noodles there since the early 18th century. At that time, pork was the condiment for the noodles. In the next century, many migrants arrived in Solo, one of the major cities during the colonial era. Hery Priyatmoko claims that most of these migrants came from Wonogiri, who are called kaum boro. They worked in Chinese food stalls, and after they finished their time in Solo, they returned to their hometown in Wonogiri and started selling noodles with chicken toppings because of the Islamic majority inhabitants.

== Preparation and serving ==
The yellow wheat noodle is boiled in water until it achieves an al dente texture and mixed in a bowl with cooking oil, soy sauce, and garlic. The oil coats the noodles to separate the threads. The oil can be chicken fat, lard, vegetable oil, or garlic oil. The chicken meat is diced and cooked in soy sauce and other seasonings, including garlic. The chicken meat might also be cooked with mushrooms.

The seasoned chicken and mushroom mixture is placed on the noodles and topped with chopped spring onions (green shallots). Bakmi ayam is usually served with a separate chicken broth, boiled Chinese cabbage, and often wonton (Indonesian: pangsit) either crispy fried or in soup, and also bakso (meatballs). While Chinese variants might use pork fat or lard, the more common Indonesian mie ayam uses halal chicken fat, vegetable oil, or garlic oil to cater to Muslim eaters.

Additional condiments might include tong cay (salted preserved vegetables), bawang goreng (fried shallots), daun bawang (leek), kulit pangsit goreng (fried dumpling skin), acar timun cabe rawit (pickled cucumber and birds eye chilli), saus cabai or saos cabe (chili sauce), sambal and tomato ketchup.

== Variants ==
In Indonesia, the name is shortened to mie ayam or mi ayam. In Indonesia, chicken noodles are often seasoned with soy sauce and chicken oil, made from a mixture of chicken fat and spices (clove, white pepper, ginger, and coriander), and usually served with a chicken broth soup.

=== Flavour variants ===
Mie ayam "chicken noodle" can be served in two different flavour variants: the common salty and the sweet noodle.

1. Mie ayam biasa or mie asin, common salty mie ayam, which are the common savoury or salty noodle that uses salty soy sauce and chicken oil.
2. Mie yamin or mie manis is the sweet variant, where additional sweet soy sauce or kecap manis is given, giving the noodles a brownish tinge.

=== Regional variants ===
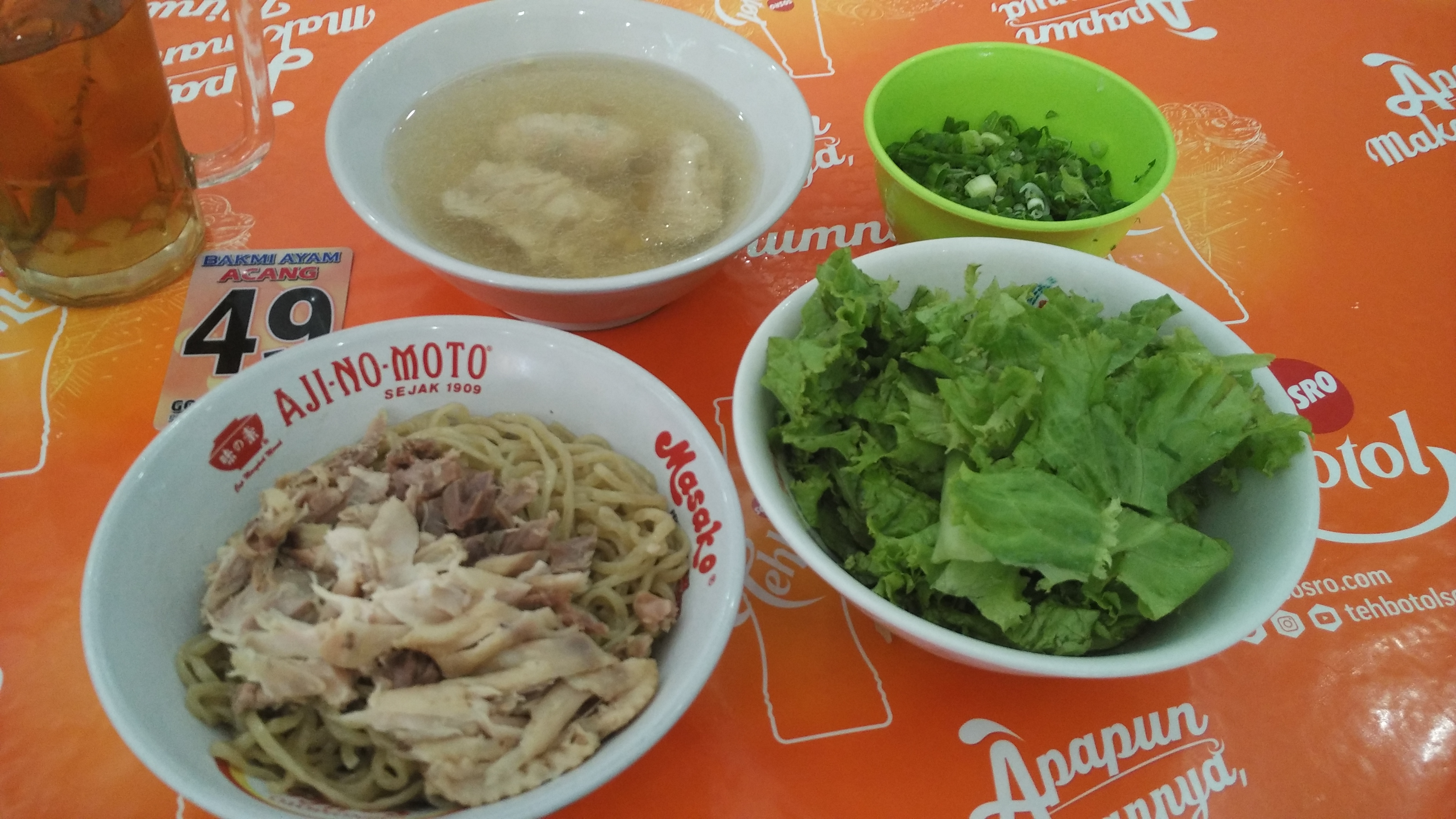
A set of Jakarta ayam kampung-style mie ayam with suikiaw (prawn dumpling) soup and lettuce.

There are variants of mie ayam based on the region, such as:

1. Bangka-style mie ayam, separated-broth mie ayam with savory minced chicken, greens, and bean sprouts. The noodles is mixed with soy sauce and seasonings in a large mixing bowl before being served to customer.
2. Jakarta ayam kampung-style mie ayam, a noodle dish of mie karet (rubber-like-chewy noodles), boiled free-range chicken breast or thigh pieces and separate broth soup.
3. Wonogiri-style mie ayam, a noodle soup with sweet diced chicken, greens, and scallions. It can be added with chili sauce made of ubi jalar (sweet potato) and chilis, often called saus mie ayam (mie ayam sauce) which is always available at the seller's stall.

=== Noodles colour variants ===
A relatively recent creation is the colourful mie ayam. It uses additional ingredients mixed into the noodle dough that alter the noodle's color significantly.

1. Green noodles mie ayam; the noodle is coloured with spinach, choy sum, or spirulina.
2. Black noodles mie ayam; the noodle is coloured with squid's ink, or charcoal.
3. Red noodles mie ayam; the noodle is coloured with beetroot, or red dragon fruit.
4. Blue noodles mie ayam; the noodle is coloured with blue pea.
5. Purple noodles mie ayam; the noodle is coloured with taro.
6. Rainbow noodles mie ayam or mie ayam pelangi; the mixing of aforementioned coloured noodles.

=== Noodles substitute variants ===
Other types of noodles, such as bihun (rice vermicelli) and kwetiau (flat noodles) might be served in the same recipe instead of the bakmi. Kwetiau ayam (chicken kway teow) and bihun ayam (chicken bihun) refer to almost the same recipe as mie ayam by replacing the yellow wheat noodles with flat noodles or rice vermicelli.

== Gallery ==
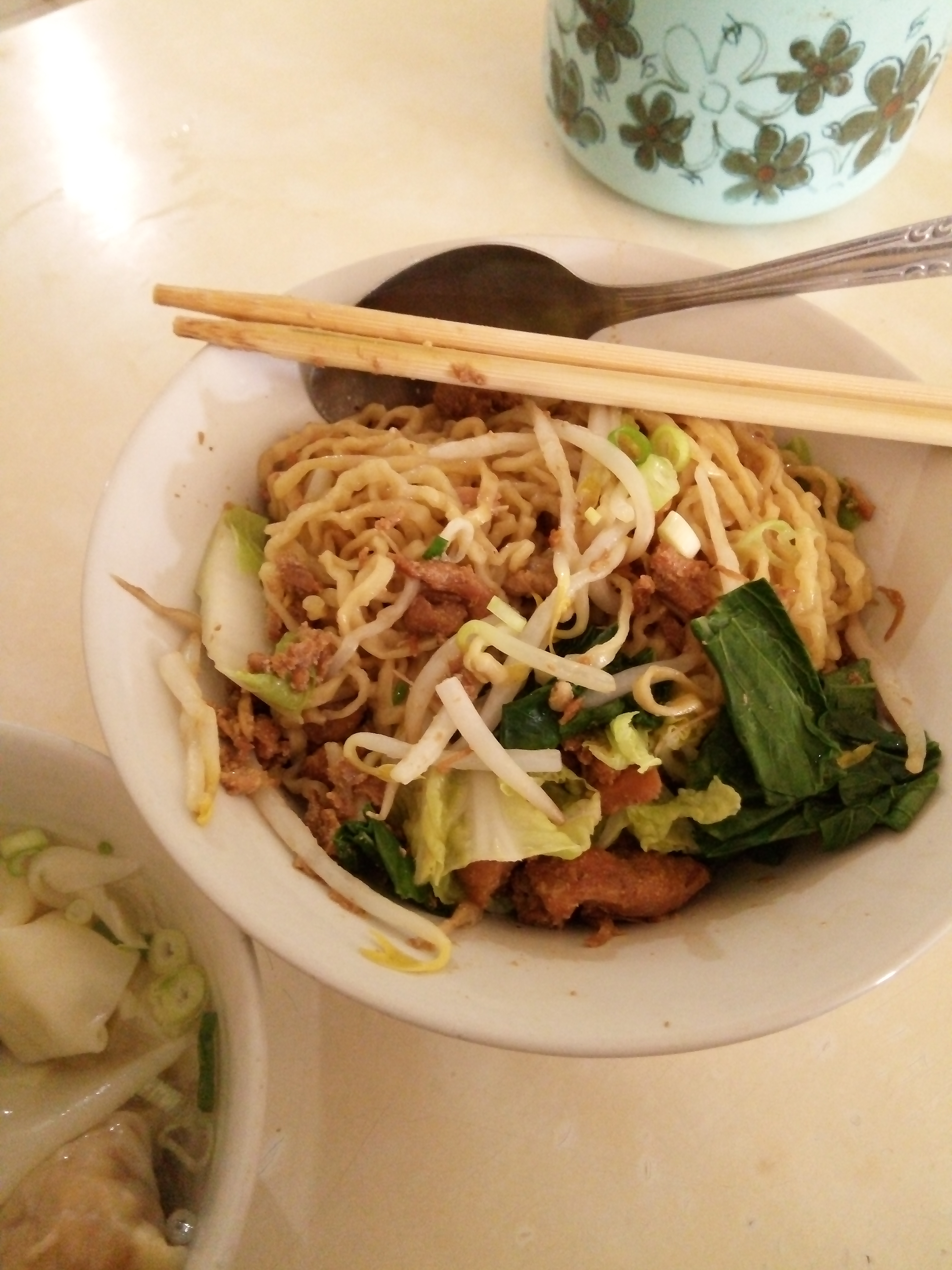
Bangka-style mie ayam

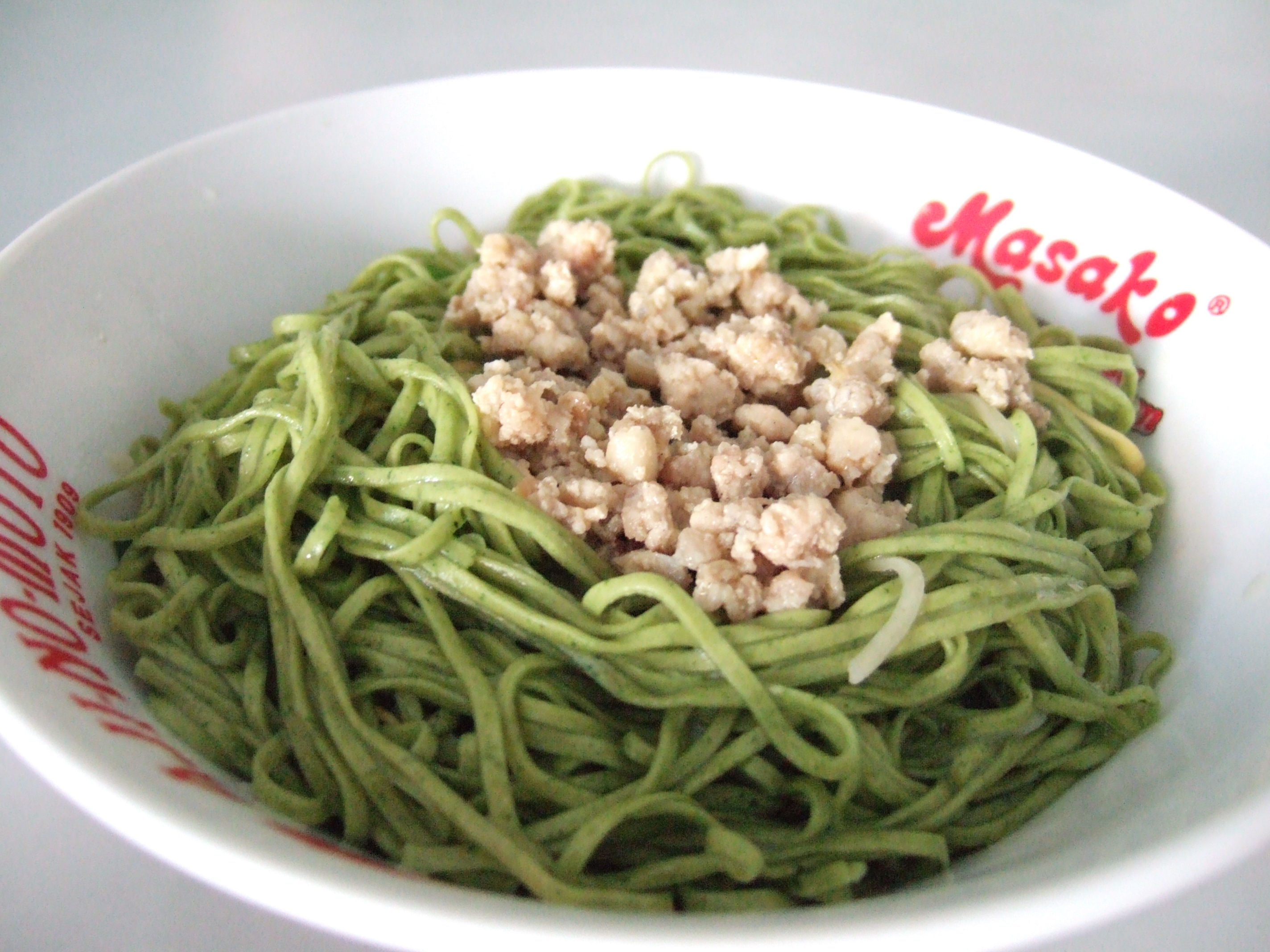
Mie ayam hijau (green mie ayam) or mie ayam bayam (spinach mie ayam)

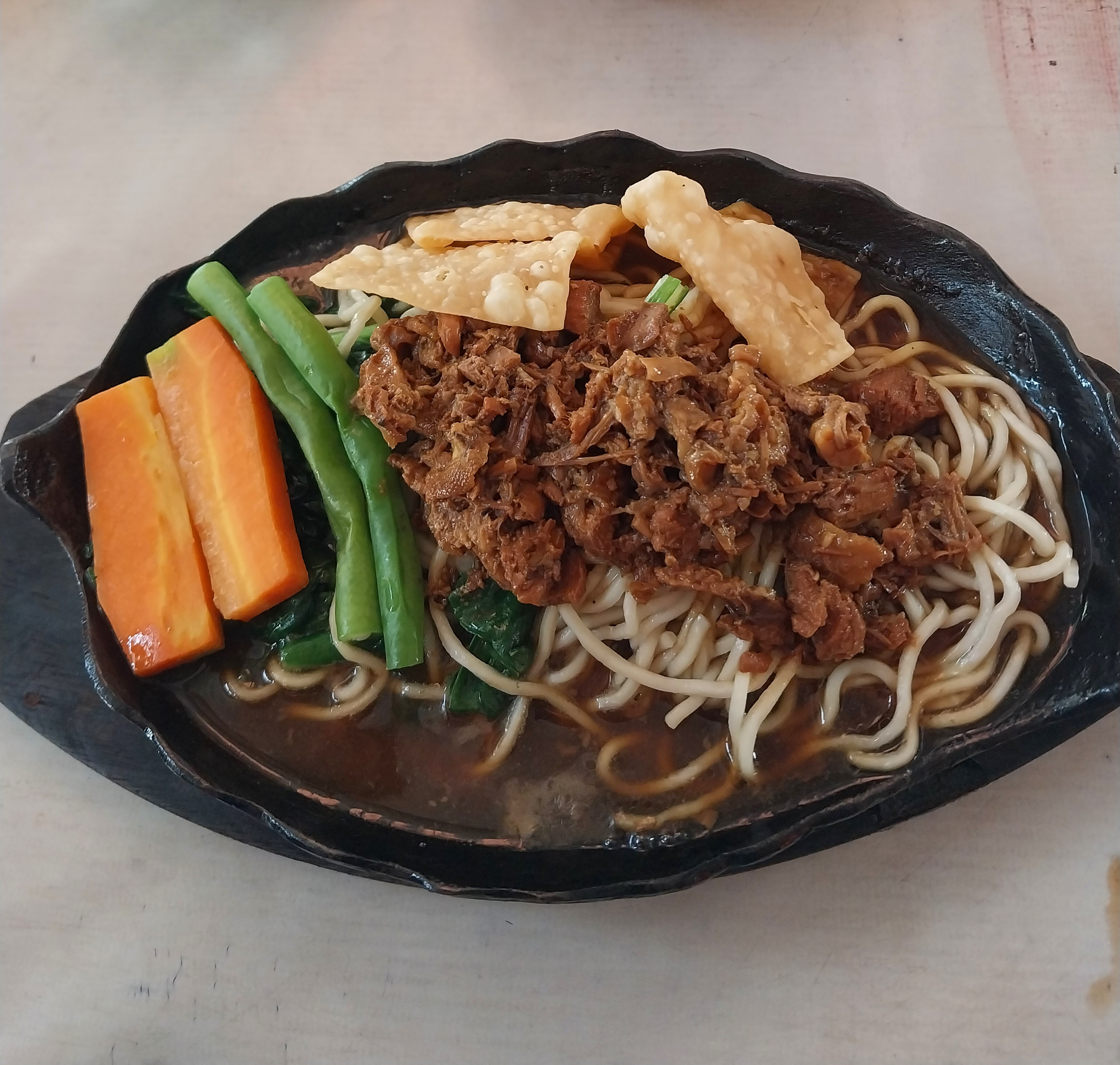
Mie ayam hotplate, cooked and served on a hot cast iron

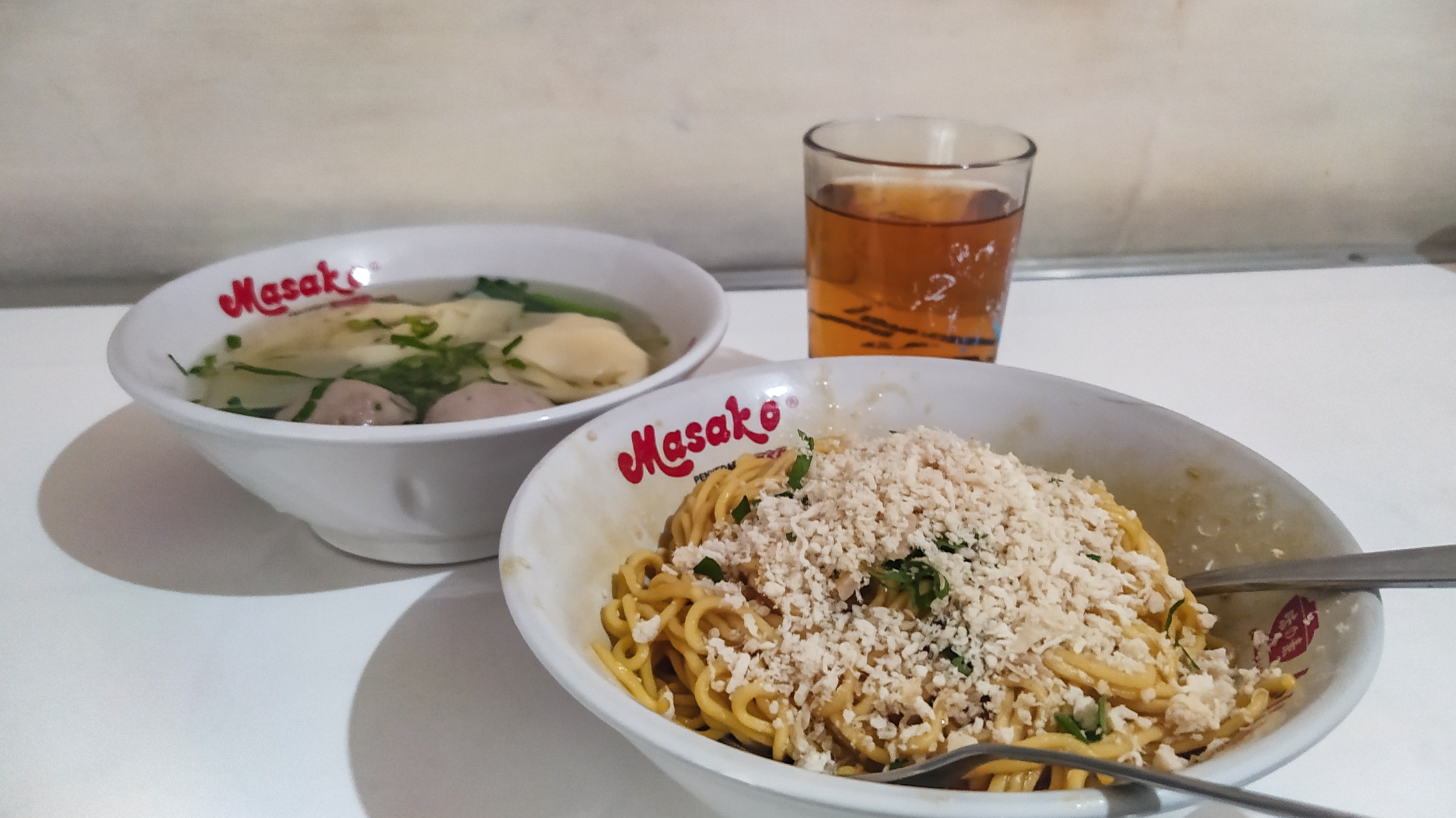
Mie yamin topped with ground chicken in Bandung

== See also ==
- Mie goreng
- Kwetiau goreng
- List of chicken dishes
