= Bakmi =

Indonesian noodles with meat

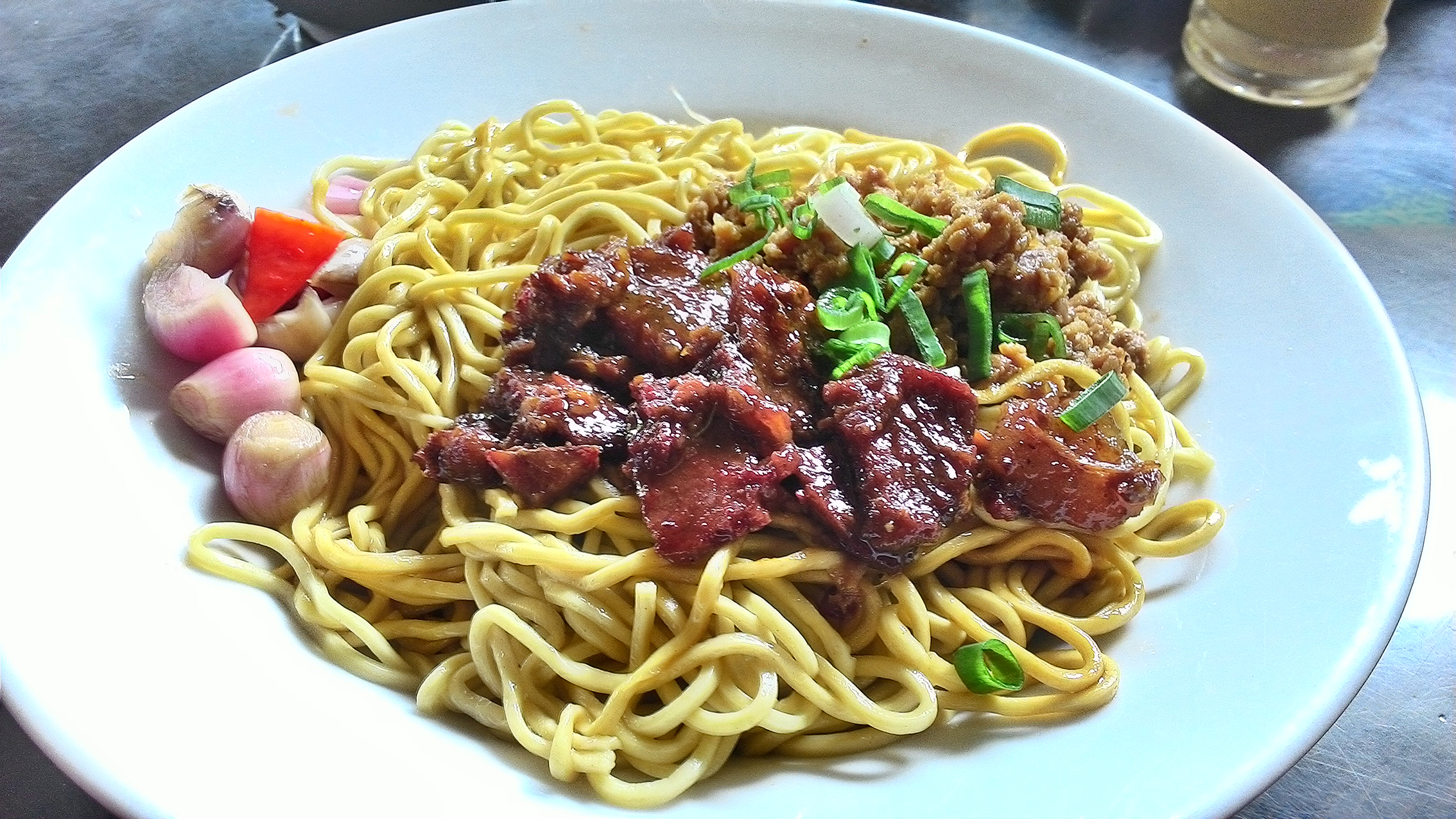
- Bakmi topped with pork
- Alternative names: Bami, bakmie
- Type: Noodle
- Course: Main dish
- Place of origin: Indonesia
- Region or state: Indonesia; Thailand; Singapore; Laos; Suriname; Belgium; Netherlands
- Serving temperature: hot
- Main ingredients: Wheat flour, ground pork, soy sauce

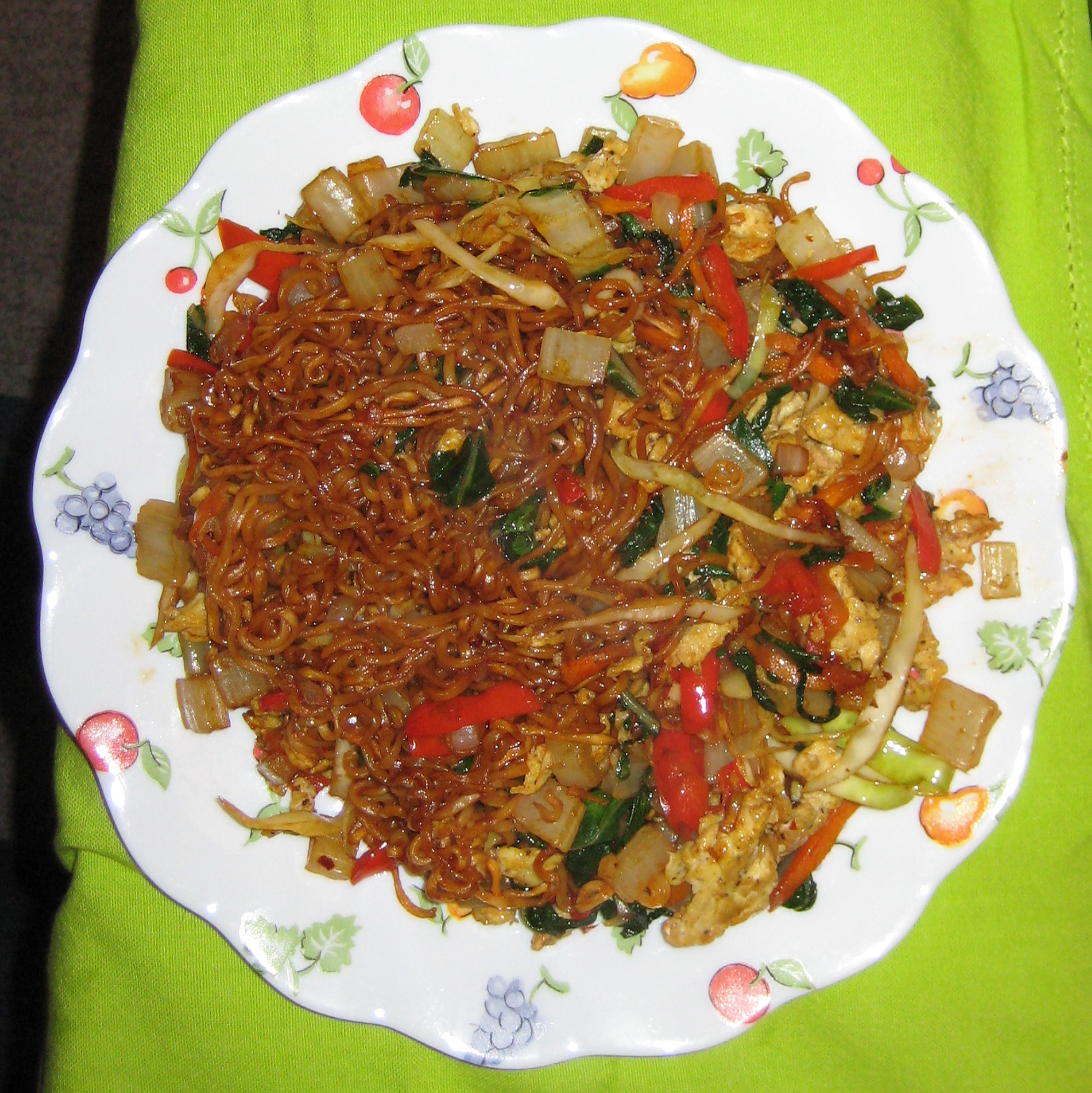
Bami goreng (fried bakmi) in the Netherlands

Bakmi (Javanese: ꦧꦏ꧀ꦩꦶ and Sundanese: ᮘᮊᮬᮤ, romanized: bakmi) or bami (Thai: บะหมี่, pronounced [bā.mìː], Lao: ບະໝີ່, pronounced [bā.mīː]) are a type of wheat-based noodles derived from Chinese cooking tradition. They were brought to Indonesia by Chinese immigrants from southern Chinese provinces like Fujian. They are typically seasoned with soy sauce and topped with pork products, which are substituted for other protein sources in predominantly Muslim Indonesia. Chinese-style wheat noodles have become one of the most common noodle dishes in Southeast Asian countries, which have significant Chinese populations.

The noodles are known as bakmi in Indonesia, where they have been adapted to more closely align with the local tastes and into Javanese and Indo cuisine. Bakmi are between Chinese-style wheat noodles and Japanese udon in thickness, and there are several variants in Indonesia. The name bakmi literally translates to "meat noodle".

In Indonesia, especially in large urban areas such as Jakarta, Medan, and Surabaya, there are many warung food stalls, restaurants, and eateries that serve this type of noodle dish, each specialising in different ingredients and toppings.

== Origin and history ==
Bakmi consists of two Hokkien Chinese words, which literally translates to English as "meat noodles" (肉麵, Pe̍h-ōe-jī: bah-mī).

Chinese influence is evident in Indonesian food such as bakmi, mie ayam, pangsit, mie goreng, and kwetiau goreng. The words mie and bami, used in Dutch, come from bakmi and were introduced into the Dutch language during the Dutch colonial period in Indonesia. Indonesian food is very popular in the Netherlands, and bami goreng (fried bakmi) is a popular dish.

In Thailand, wheat-based egg noodles are known as bami, which may be ordered as bami nam or bami haeng (egg noodles with soup and without soup respectively), and the noodles may be used in Chinese style stir-fried dishes.

In the Philippines, a similar noodle dish is called pancit bam-i or pancit mami, where it is called bam-i in Cebuano Bisaya, or mami/bami in Tagalog (Filipino).

== Ingredients ==
Bakmi or bami is a type of wheat noodle with a slightly pale yellow colour. The most common type of bakmi in Indonesia is mi kuning or 'yellow noodles' made from finely ground wheat, sometimes enriched with eggs as mi telur (egg noodle) made into dough, ground and run through holes to create noodle strings. The traditional way to create bakmi is by pulling the dough several times coated with flour to create the noodle strings, similar to the method to make lamian.

The most common recipe of bakmi dish in Indonesia uses chicken meat as the majority of Indonesians are Muslims. Chicken noodle (Indonesian: bakmie ayam or mie ayam), mie ayam is wheat noodle topped with diced chicken meat seasoned in soy sauce. Mie ayam often accompanied with wonton (Indonesian: pangsit) either crispy fried or in soup, and also bakso (meatball). Bakmi ayam is a popular Chinese Indonesian dish and ubiquitous in Indonesian cities, it can be served in a restaurant to a humble travelling cart. The other popular Indonesian bakmi recipe is fried bakmi (Indonesian: bakmie goreng or Indonesian: mie goreng).

== Preparation ==
Bakmi is normally boiled for serving. When bakmi is intended for use in soup, it is usually boiled separately from the broth. The noodles are usually mixed with animal fats, either from pork, chicken or beef. The noodles are then served with various toppings: an example would include a few slices of char siu (叉燒) or barbecued pork, with addition of Chinese green vegetables and a bowl of broth.

In Indonesia, the most common toppings are diced seasoned chicken with choy sum and fried wonton skin, to a more complete version served with fried or boiled wonton and bakso (meatballs). The soup is served in a different bowl, and is added to the noodles by the individual diner according to taste. Several notable Indonesian dishes developed from the original Chinese wheat noodle tradition includes mie ayam (chicken noodle) and mie goreng (stir fried noodle in sweet soy sauce). I fu mie is bakmi that is first deep fried and then topped with a thickened gravy of vegetables and meat.

== Varieties ==
=== Indonesian ===
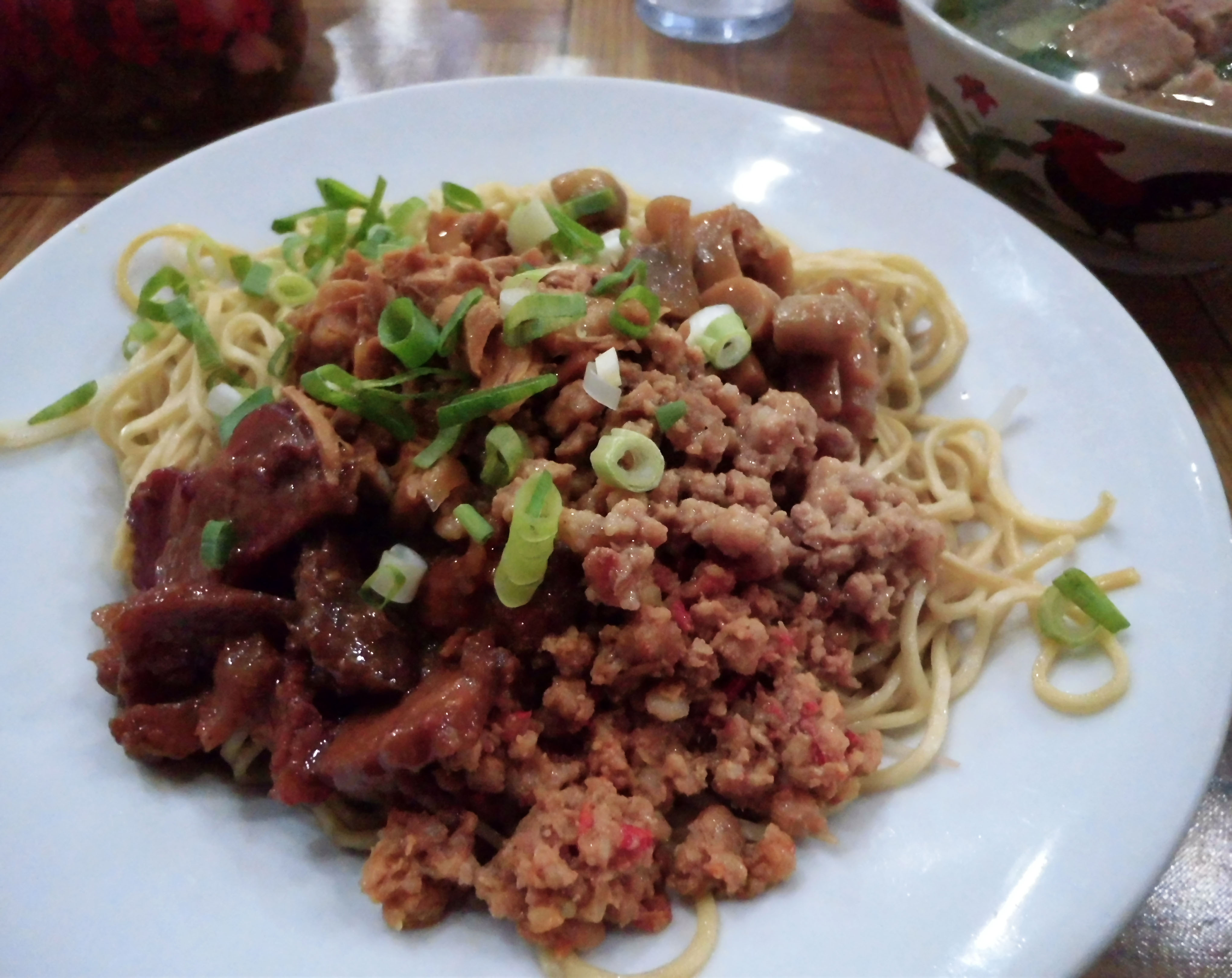
Bakmi bangka

- Bakmi bangka, a Chinese Indonesian noodle dish from Bangka Island. Noodles are topped with minced pork, slices of braised pork, mushroom and chopped scallion. The original Chinese Indonesian version uses minced pork; the halal version, however, usually uses minced chicken. The soup, sambal tauco and key lime are usually served on the side.
- Bakmi siantar, pork noodle from Pematang Siantar town in North Sumatra, usually served with red char siu coloured with angkak. Popular within Batak cuisine, it was derived from, and possibly the most closer version to the traditional Chinese Indonesian bakmi (meat/pork noodle). The soup and sambal are usually served on the side.
- Bakmi ayam, Indonesian Chinese chicken noodles.
- Bakmi goreng, Indonesian Chinese fried noodles, omnipresent in Indonesia.
- Bakmi jawa, from Central and East Java with somewhat wet consistency.
- Bakmi aceh, from Aceh; it has a curry-like flavor.
- Bakmi celor, from Palembang. Noodles are topped with shrimps, bean sprouts, sliced egg, and celery and poured with sweet and starchy gravy.
- Bakmi pangsit, generally known from Sumatera area, North Sumatera, Medan, etc. The soup and sambal are usually served on the side.
- Bakmi belitung, from Belitung island. Noodles are topped with shrimps, cubed potatoes, sliced cucumbers, and emping and poured with sweet and starchy brown gravy. Sambal and key limes are usually served on the side.
- Bakmi kangkung is composed of noodles, kangkung, bean sprouts, minced meat and broth. Kaffir limes are usually served on the side.
- Bakmi jambi, from Jambi (city). Noodles are topped with minced pork, slices of grilled pork and chopped scallion. The soup is served on the side containing wontons, fish balls, lettuce and sometimes pig organs. The soup is cloudy due to the finely minced pork minced in it.
- Bakmi palembang, from Palembang. Noodles are topped with minced pork, slices of grilled pork and chopped scallion. The soup, sambal and key limes are served on the side.
- Bakmi pontianak, from Pontianak. Noodles are topped with crab meat, fish balls, sliced fishcakes, minced pork, fried wonton skin and chopped scallion. The soup, sambal and calamansi are served on the side.
- Bakmi singkawang, from Singkawang. Noodles are topped with minced pork, slices of char siu, fish balls, sliced fishcakes, wontons and chopped scallion. The soup, sambal and pickled galangal are served on the side. Pork can be substituted with beef or chicken.

=== Thailand ===
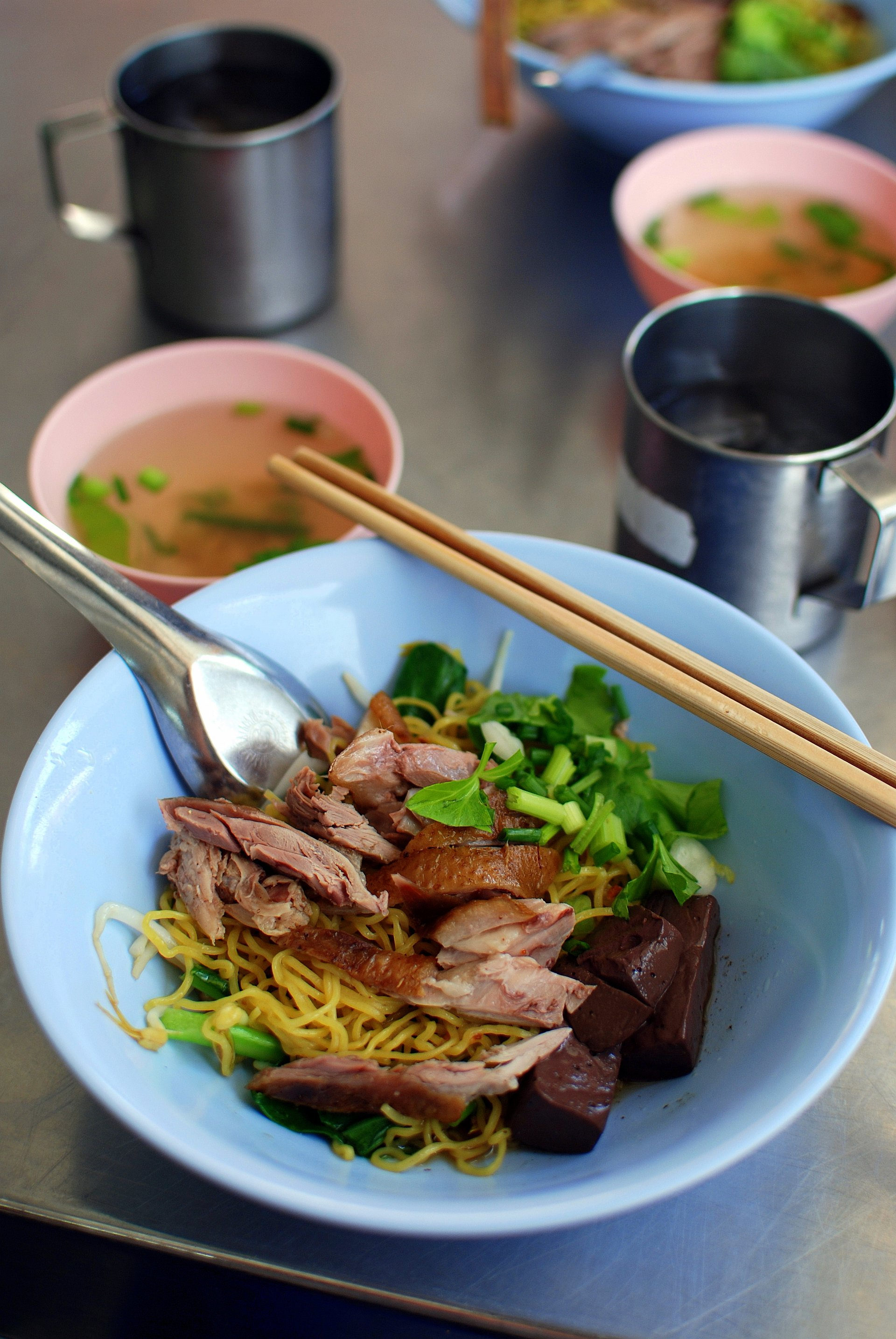
Bami haeng with roast duck

- Bami haeng (Thai: บะหมี่แห้งเป็ด, a dish made with wheat noodles (bami) served "dry" (haeng).
- Bami mu daeng (Thai: บะหมี่หมูแดง), noodle dish with red roast pork.
- Khao soi (Thai: ข้าวซอย), Northern Thai curry-soup dish which uses bami noodles.

== See also ==
- Mie ayam
- Mie goreng
- Mie rebus
- Pancit mami
