= Mie goreng =

Indonesian stir-fried noodle dish

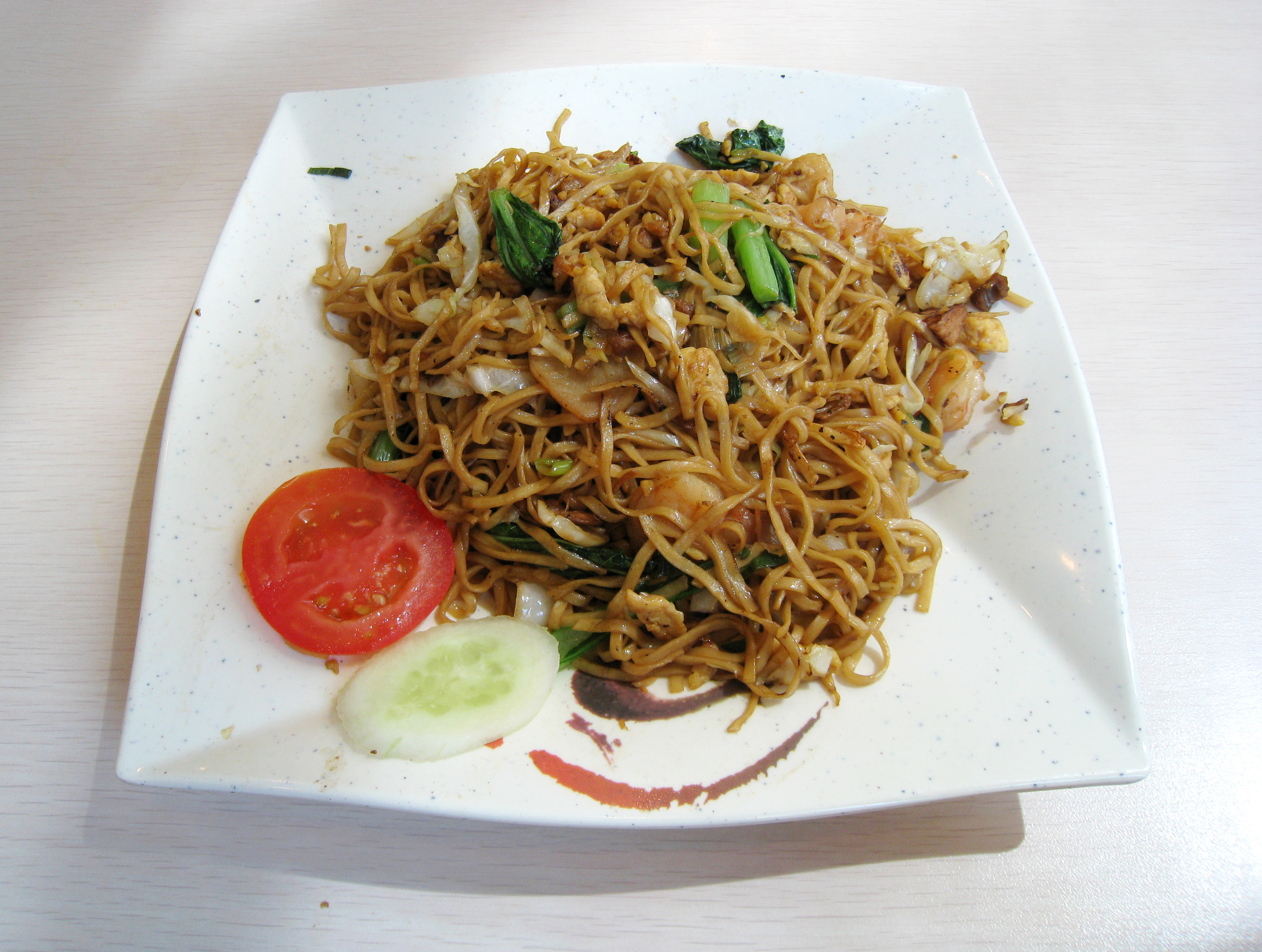
- Mie goreng in a restaurant in Jakarta
- Alternative names: Bakmi goreng, Mi goreng
- Type: Noodle
- Course: Main course
- Place of origin: Indonesia
- Region or state: Nationwide
- Serving temperature: Hot
- Main ingredients: Fried noodles with chicken, meat or prawn

Mie goreng (Indonesian: mi goreng; meaning "fried noodles"), also known as bakmi goreng, is an Indonesian stir-fried noodle dish. It is made with thin yellow noodles stir-fried in cooking oil with garlic, onion or shallots, fried prawn, chicken, beef, or sliced bakso (meatballs), chili, Chinese cabbage, cabbages, tomatoes, egg, and other vegetables. Ubiquitous in Indonesia, it is sold by food vendors from street hawkers (warungs) to high-end restaurants.

== History ==
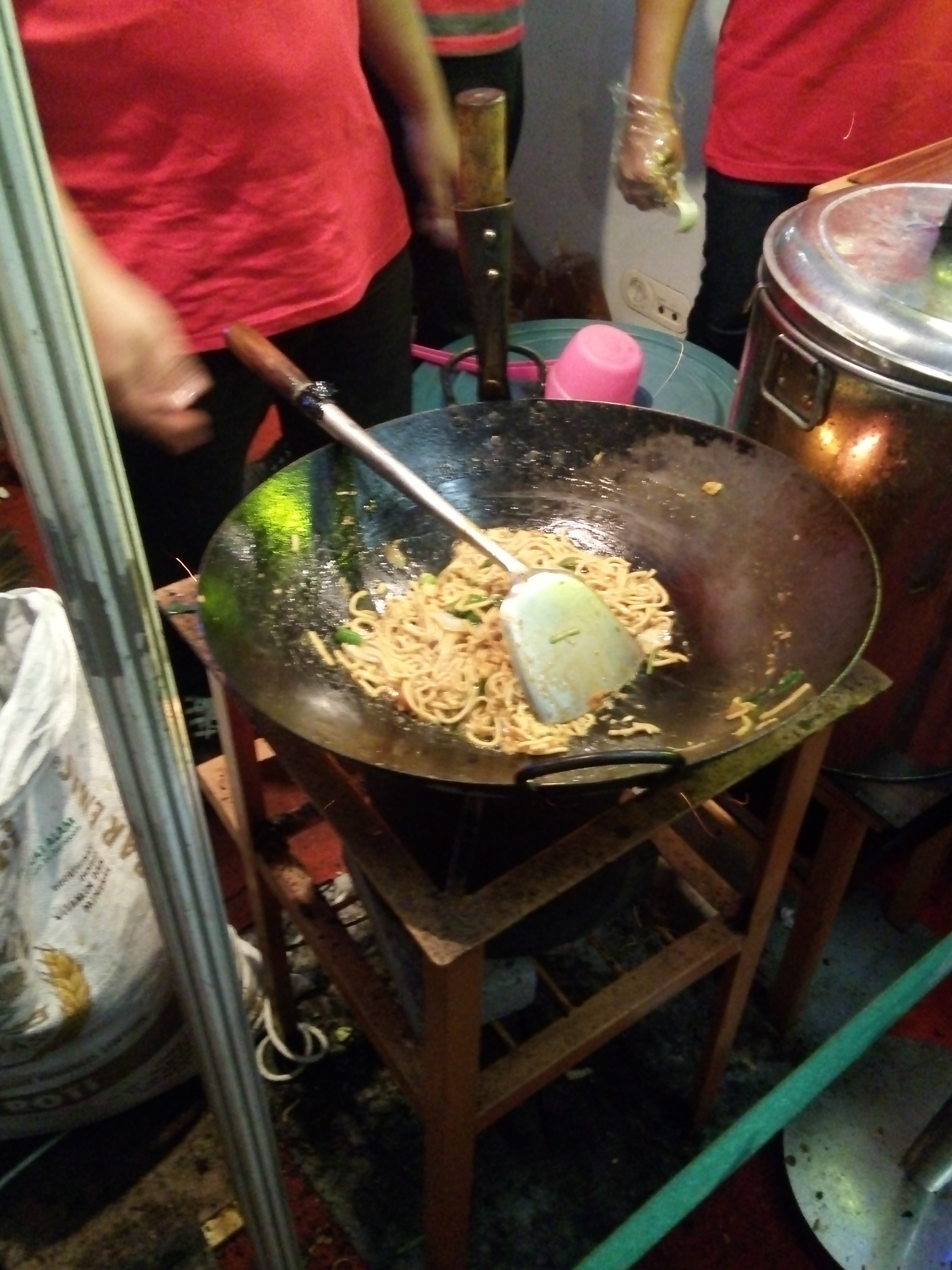
Stir-frying mi goreng Jawa in a wok

In Indonesia, where mi goreng is one of the most widespread simple dishes, the dish's origin is associated with Chinese Indonesian cuisine. Chinese influences are evident in Indonesian food such as bakmi, mi ayam, pangsit, bakso, lumpia, kwetiau goreng, and mi goreng. The dish is derived from Chinese chow mein and is believed to have been introduced by Chinese immigrants in Indonesia. Despite being influenced by Chinese cuisine, mi goreng in Indonesia has a definite Indonesian taste and has been heavily integrated into Indonesian cuisine, through, for example, the application of sweet soy sauce that adds mild sweetness, a sprinkle of fried shallots, and spicy sambal. Pork and lard are eschewed in favour of shrimp, chicken, or beef to cater to the Muslim majority.

== Preparation ==
Mi goreng is traditionally made with yellow wheat noodles, stir-fried with chopped shallots, onion, and garlic with soy sauce seasoning, egg, vegetables, chicken, meat, or seafood. However, other versions might use dried instant noodles instead of fresh yellow wheat noodles. A common practice in Indonesia is the inclusion of powdered instant noodle seasonings, along with eggs and vegetables.

The almost identical recipe is often used to create other dishes. For example, bihun goreng is made by replacing yellow wheat noodles with bihun (rice vermicelli), while kwetiau goreng uses kwetiau (thick flat rice noodles) instead.

=== Notable variations ===
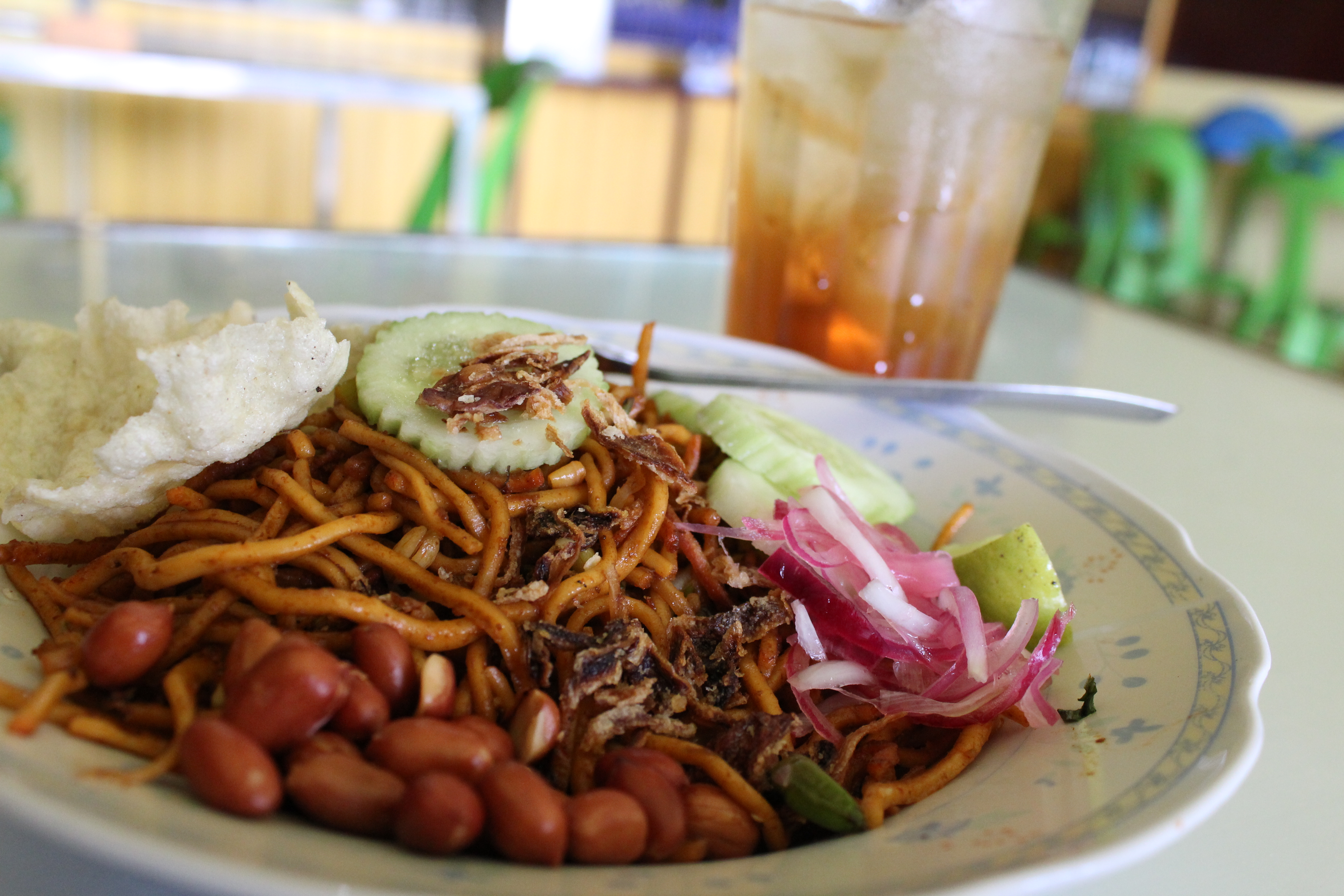
Mi goreng Aceh.

Some mi goreng variants exist. In Indonesia, mi goreng variants are usually named after the ingredients, while some might be named after the region of origin.

- Mie Bangladesh, a dish from Medan
- Mi goreng kerang uses clam. It is a specialty of Batam.
- Mi goreng Aceh, a mi goreng variant from Aceh province, uses a thicker noodle similar to that of spaghetti and employs a curry-like rich spicy paste.
- Mi goreng Jawa from Central Java, employs sweet soy sauce, egg, chicken, and vegetables. In a restaurant, warung, or travelling food vendor, it is usually sold and offered together with mi rebus (lit. "boiled noodle") or mi Jawa.
- Mi goreng dhog-dhog also known as Mi goreng Surabaya from Surabaya city. The name refers to the onomatopoeic sound of travelling food cart vendors using large wooden slit drums to attract customers, thus creating the signature "dhog-dhog" sounds.
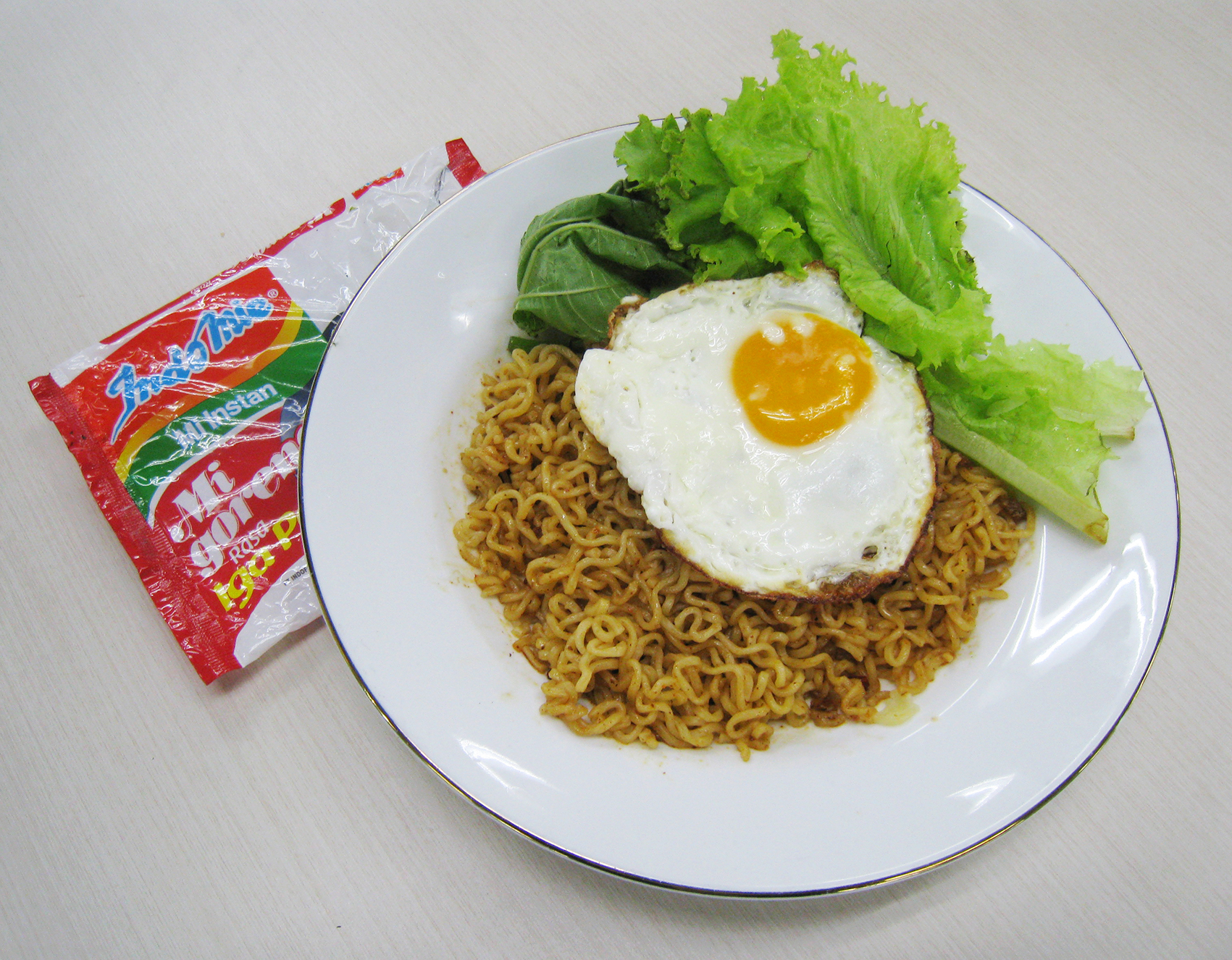
- Instant version of mie goreng
  Indomie Mi goreng the instant version of mi goreng, Indomie Mi goreng is also popular in Indonesia and other countries, notably the Netherlands, Nigeria, Australia, New Zealand, the United States, and several Middle Eastern countries. Indomie mie goreng flavour was invented by Nunuk Nuraini. This instant version, however, is not technically goreng (stir-fried), but boiled instead and seasoned after discarding the water used for boiling. Nevertheless, it tries to closely resemble the authentic mi goreng by adding sweet soy sauce and crispy fried shallot. It is commonly found in warung Indomie stalls that sell instant noodles, grilled sandwiches, and hot drinks in Indonesian urban areas.

Indonesians tend to name similar foreign dishes as mi goreng, for example in Indonesia, chow mein is often called mi goreng Cina and yakisoba is called mi goreng Jepang.

=== Gallery ===
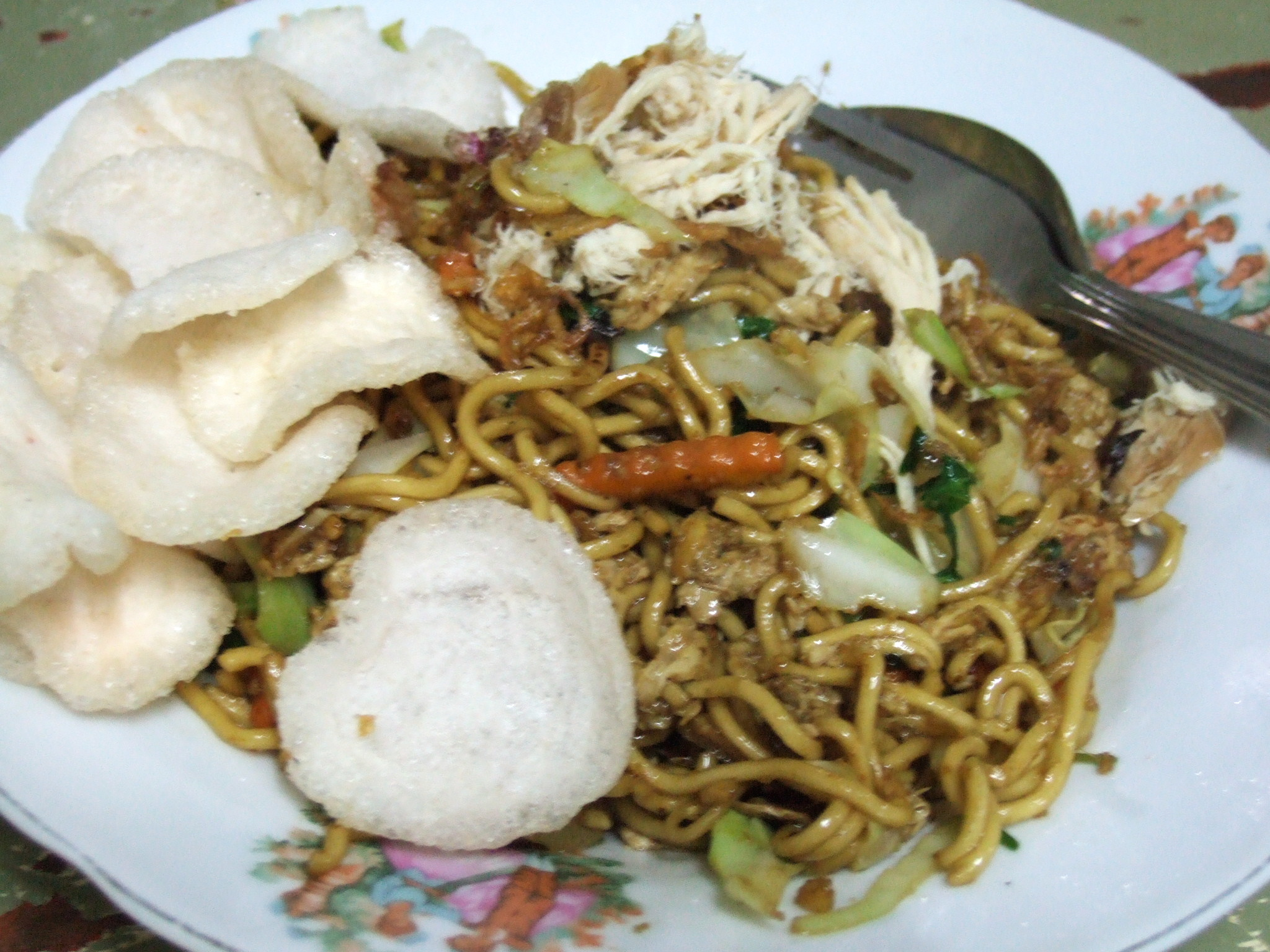
Basic mi goreng tek-tek sold by travelling street vendor

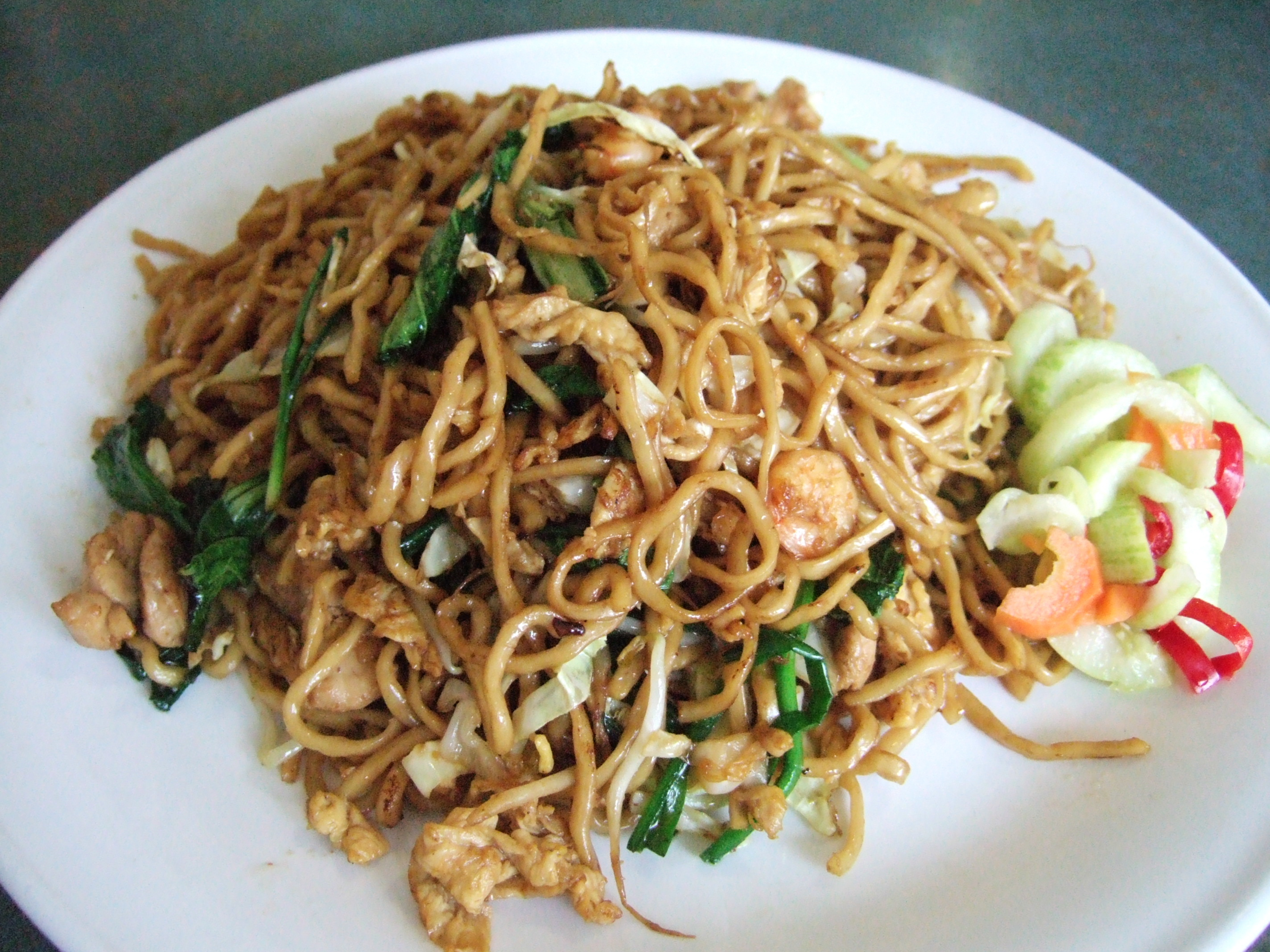
Mi goreng with chicken and shrimp in Jakarta

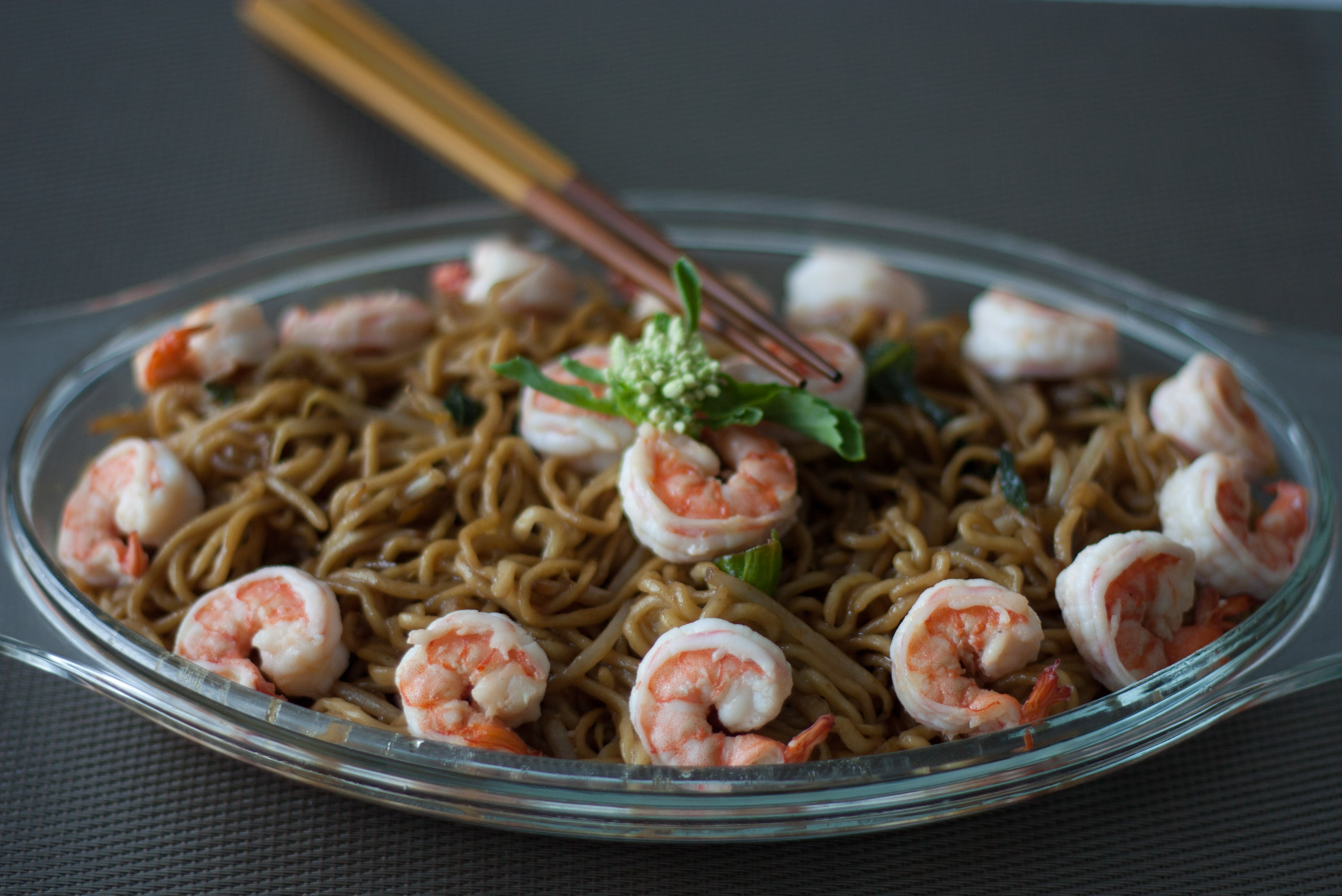
Mi goreng udang with shrimp

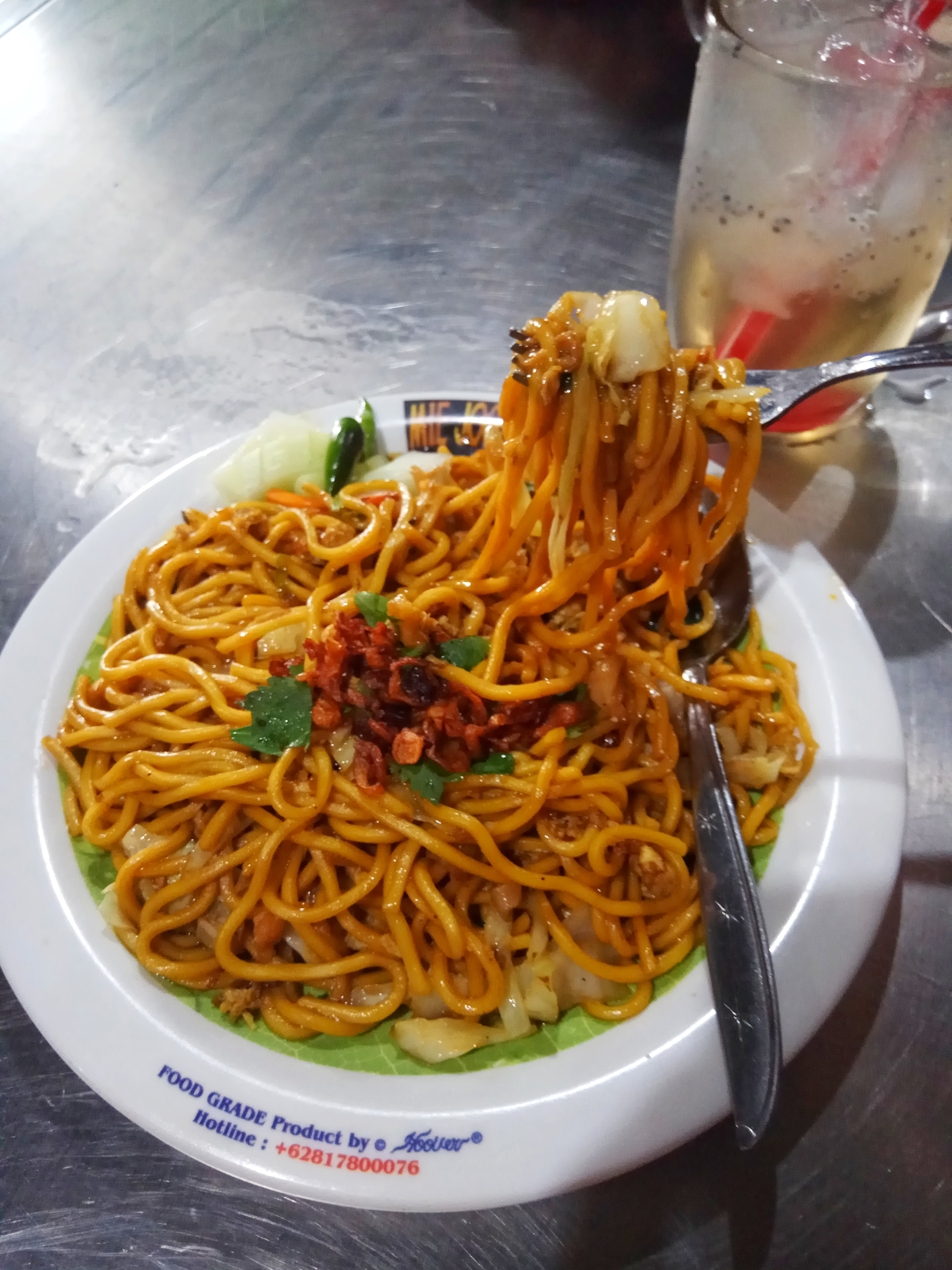
Mi goreng Jawa, Javanese style seasoned with kecap

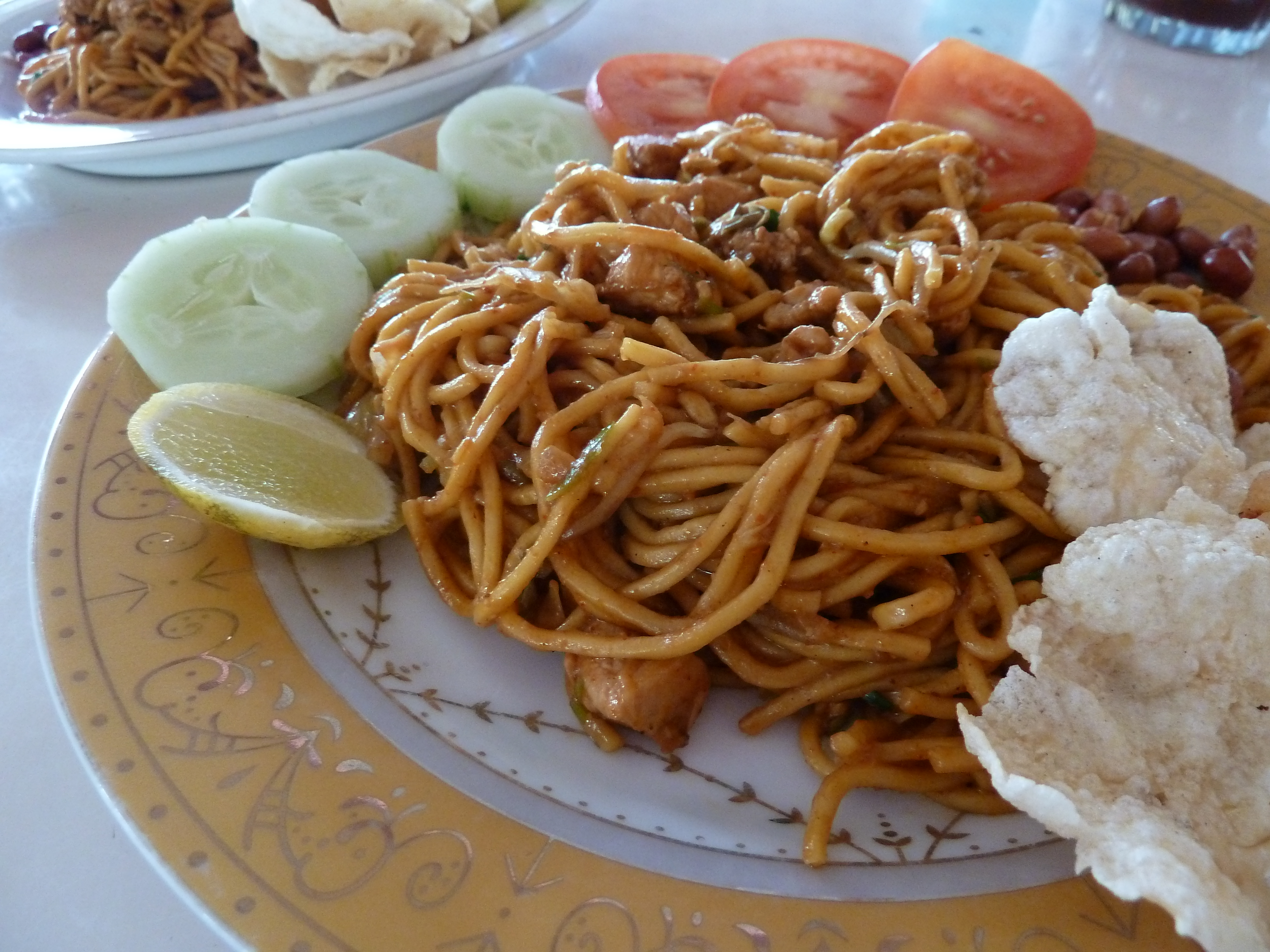
Mi goreng Aceh

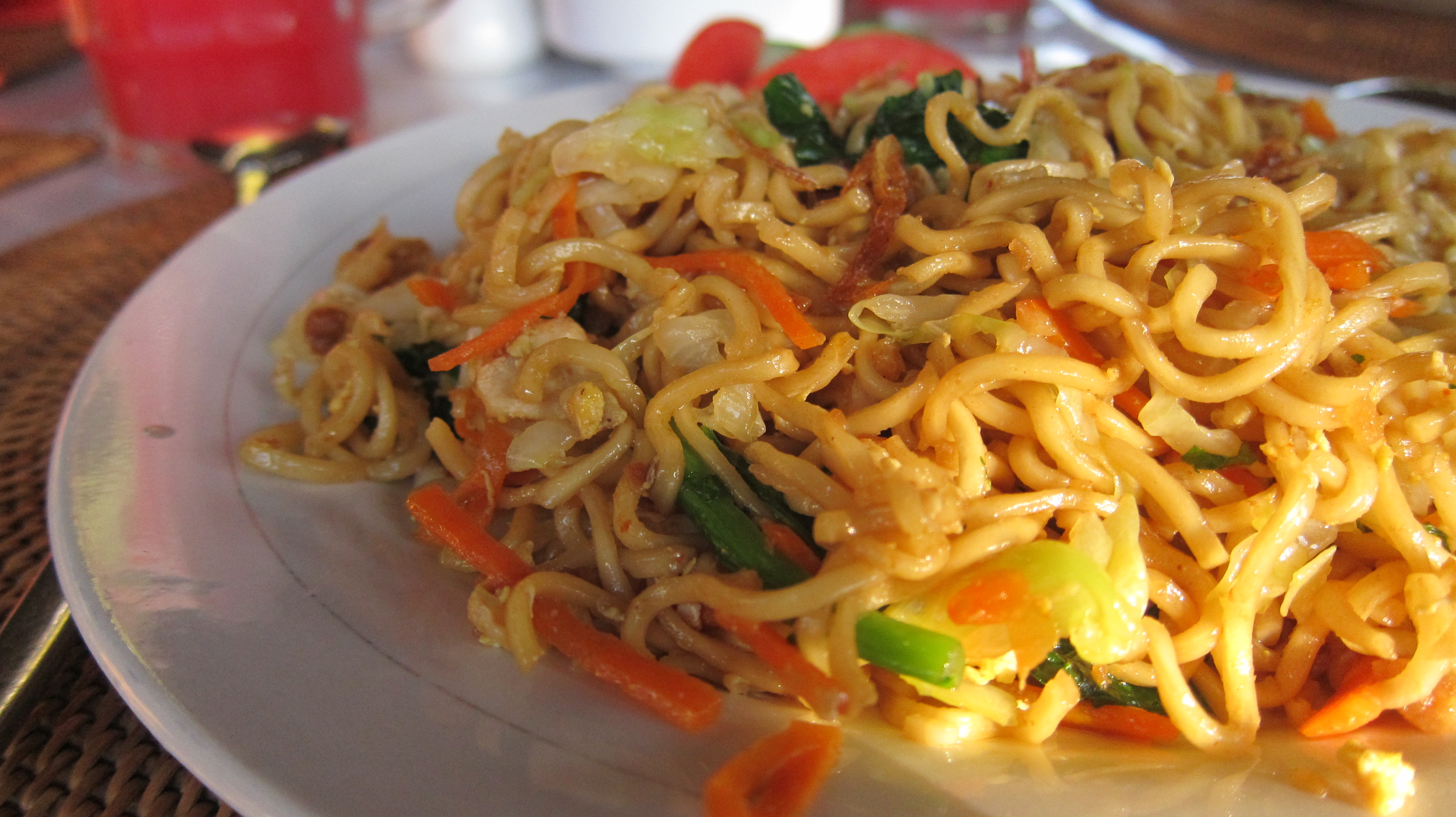
Mi goreng Bali

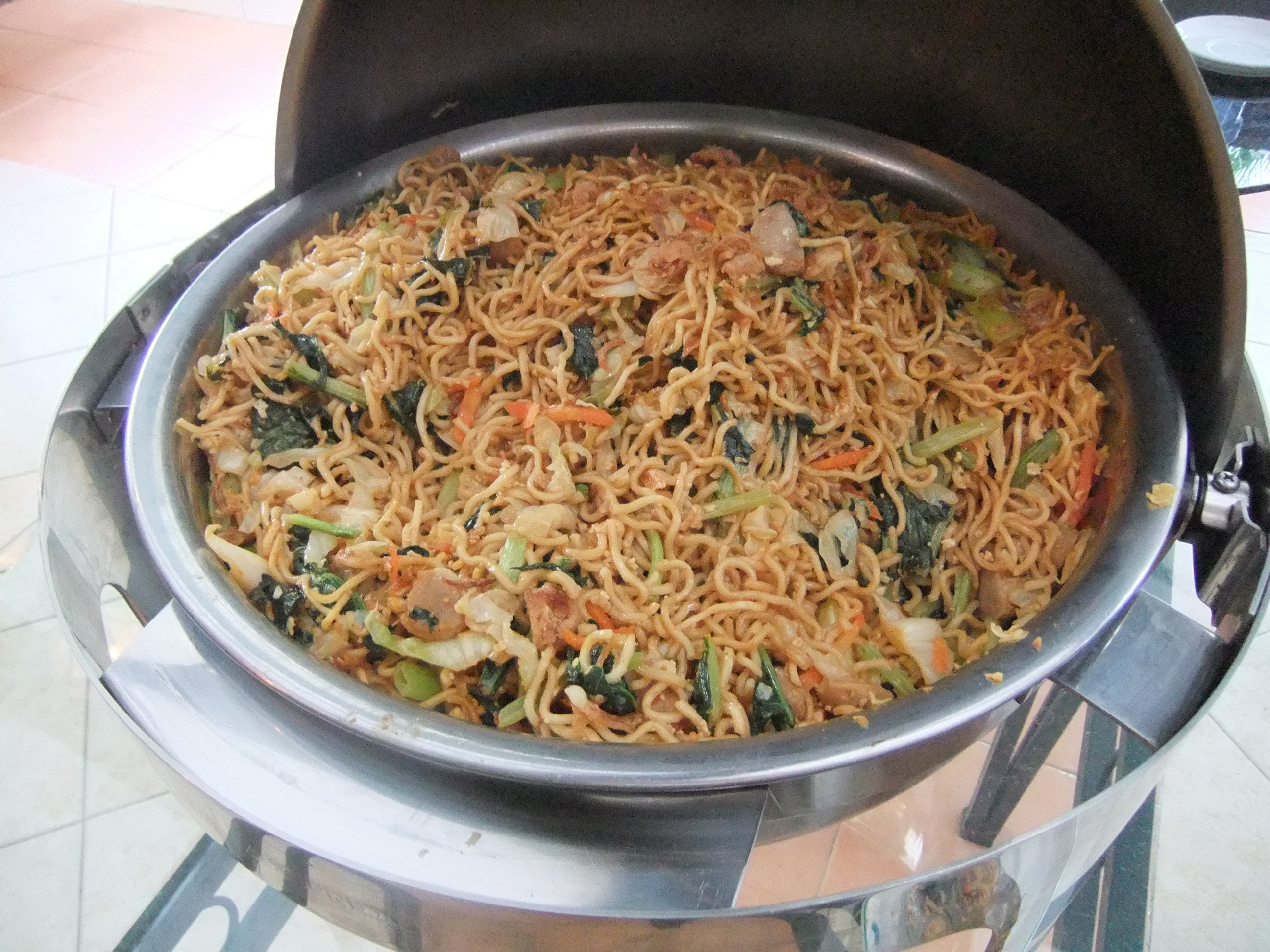
Mi goreng served as part of hotel breakfast buffet

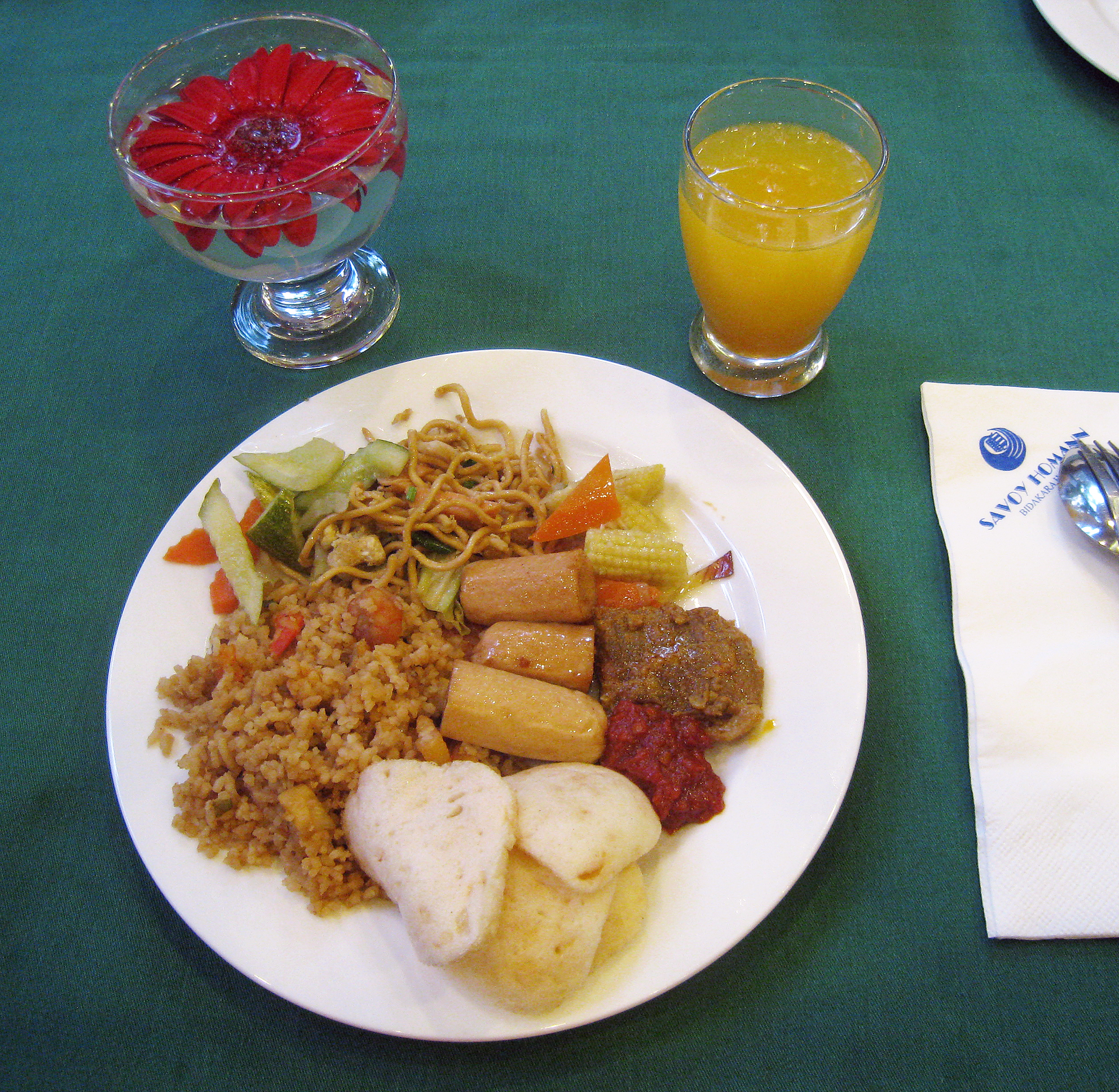
Mi goreng and nasi goreng combo, a hotel breakfast buffet

== See also ==
- Mie ayam
- Mie Bangladesh
- Mie kuah
- Bakmi
- Bakmi jawa
- Mie aceh
- Bamischijf
