= Chinese Indonesian cuisine =

Cuisine of Chinese Indonesians

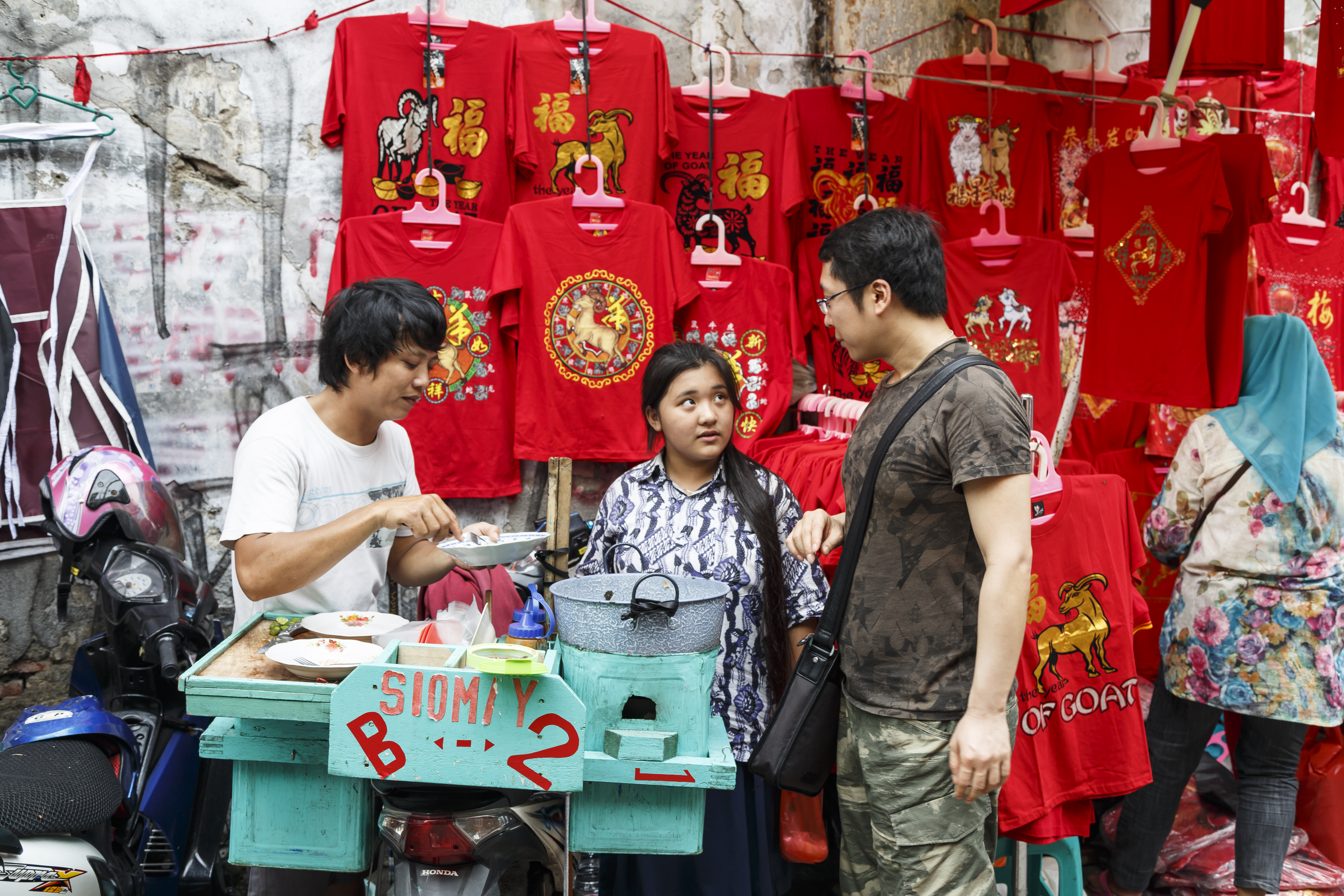
Siomay bicycle street hawker in Glodok area, Jakarta's Chinatown

Chinese Indonesian cuisine (Indonesian: Masakan Tionghoa-Indonesia, simplified Chinese: 印尼中华料理; traditional Chinese: 印尼中華料理; pinyin: yìnní zhōnghuá liàolǐ or (Ìn-nî) Tn̂g-lâng-chia̍k (印尼唐人食) is characterized by the mixture of Chinese with local Indonesian style. Chinese Indonesians, mostly descendant of Han, Hokkien and Hakka people, brought their legacy of Chinese cuisine, and modified some of the dishes with the addition of Indonesian ingredients, such as kecap manis (sweet soy sauce), palm sugar, peanut sauce, chili, santan (coconut milk) and local spices to form a hybrid Chinese-Indonesian cuisine. Some of the dishes and cakes share the same style as in Malaysia and Singapore, known as Nyonya cuisine by the Peranakan.

== Chinese cuisine legacy ==
Chinese-Indonesian cuisine

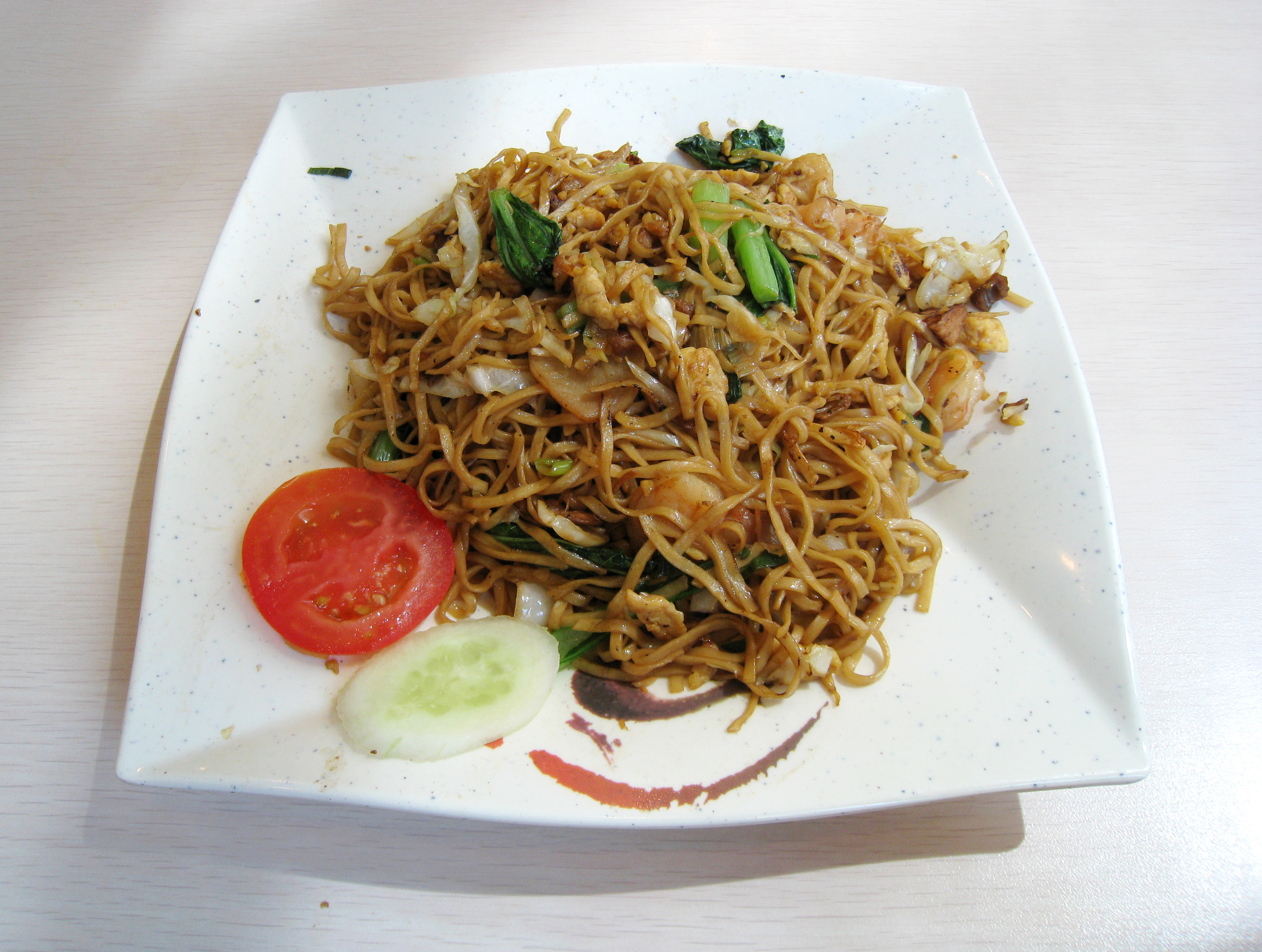
Mie goreng, a Chinese dish completely assimilated into Indonesian mainstream cuisine

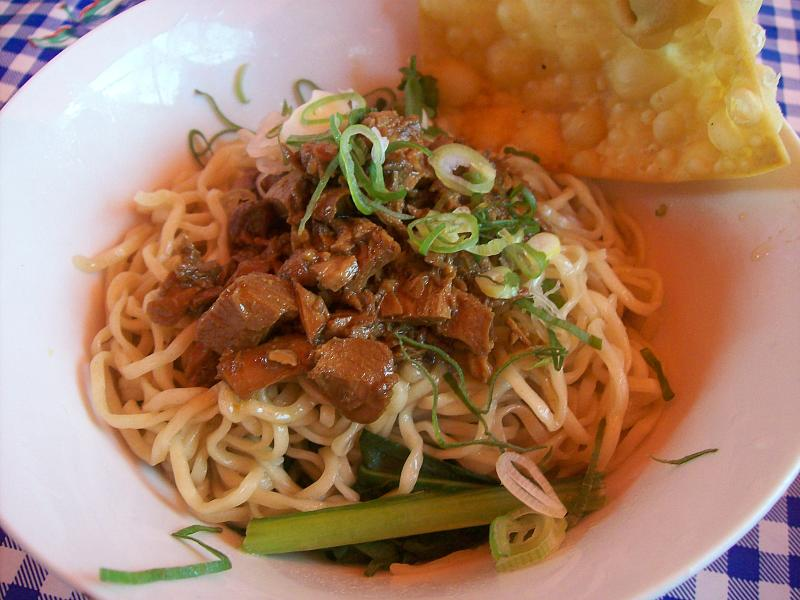
Mie ayam, and pangsit goreng, a popular noodle dish in Indonesia

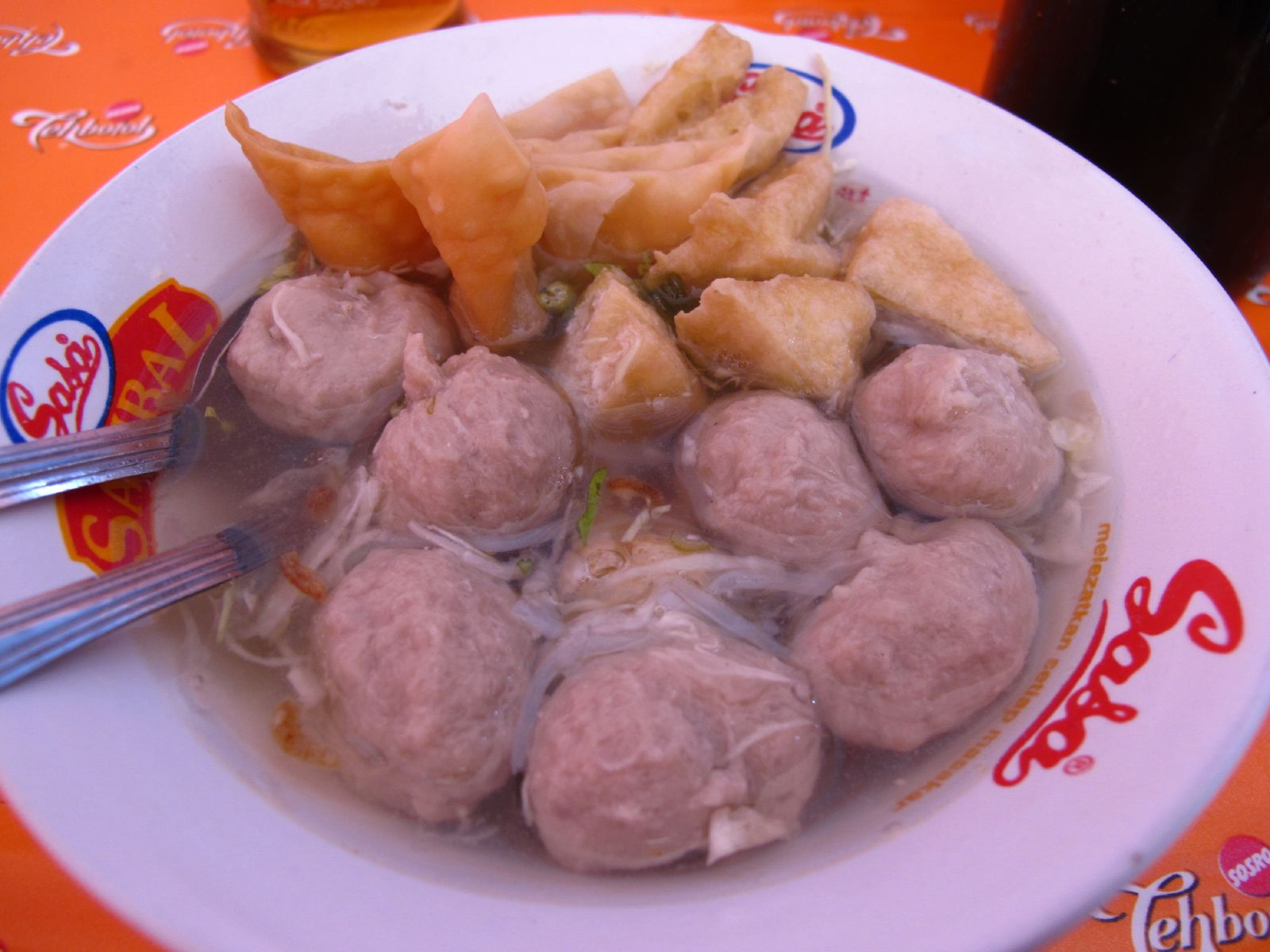
Bakso meatballs

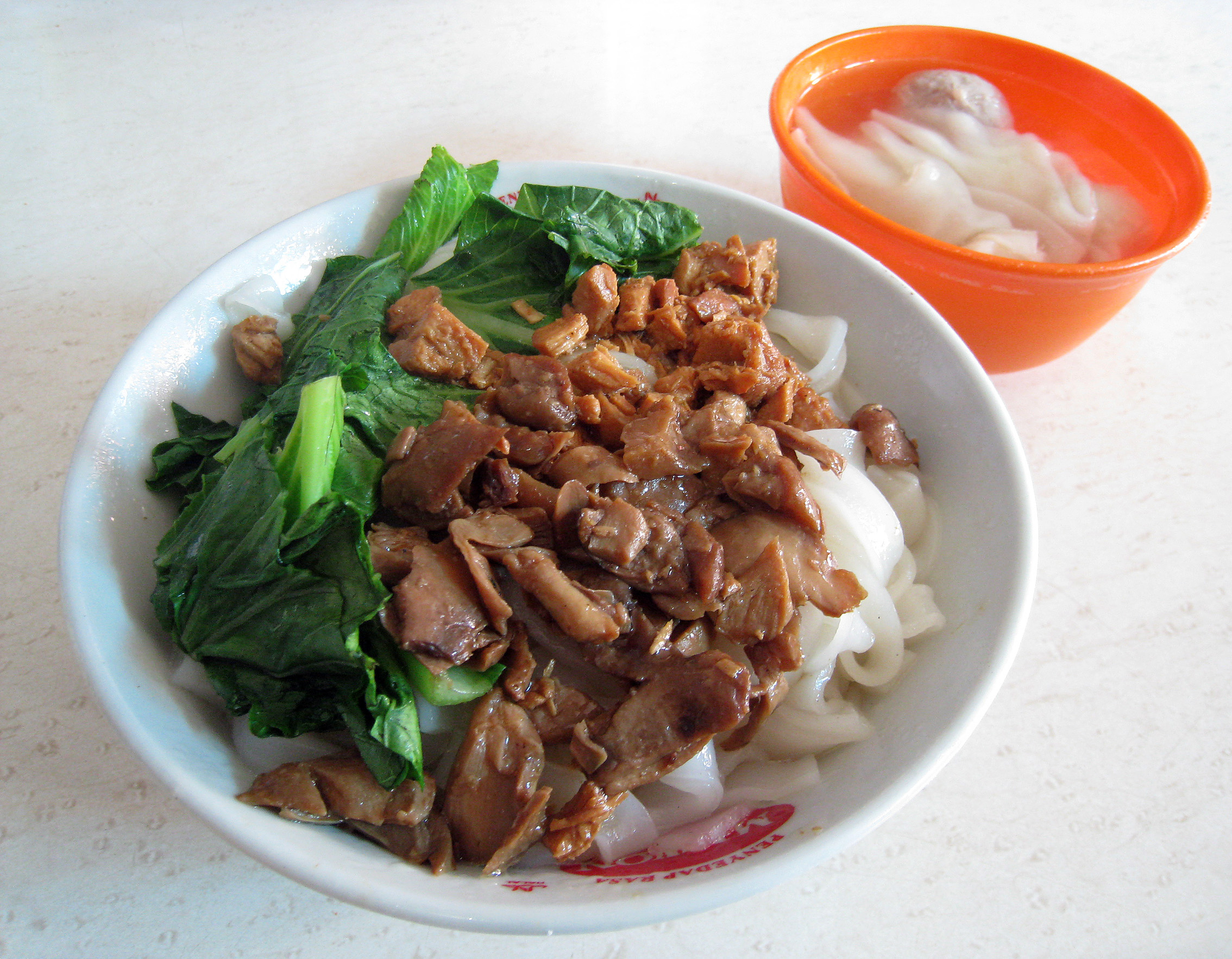
Kwetiau ayam, chicken and mushroom flat noodle with wonton soup and bakso

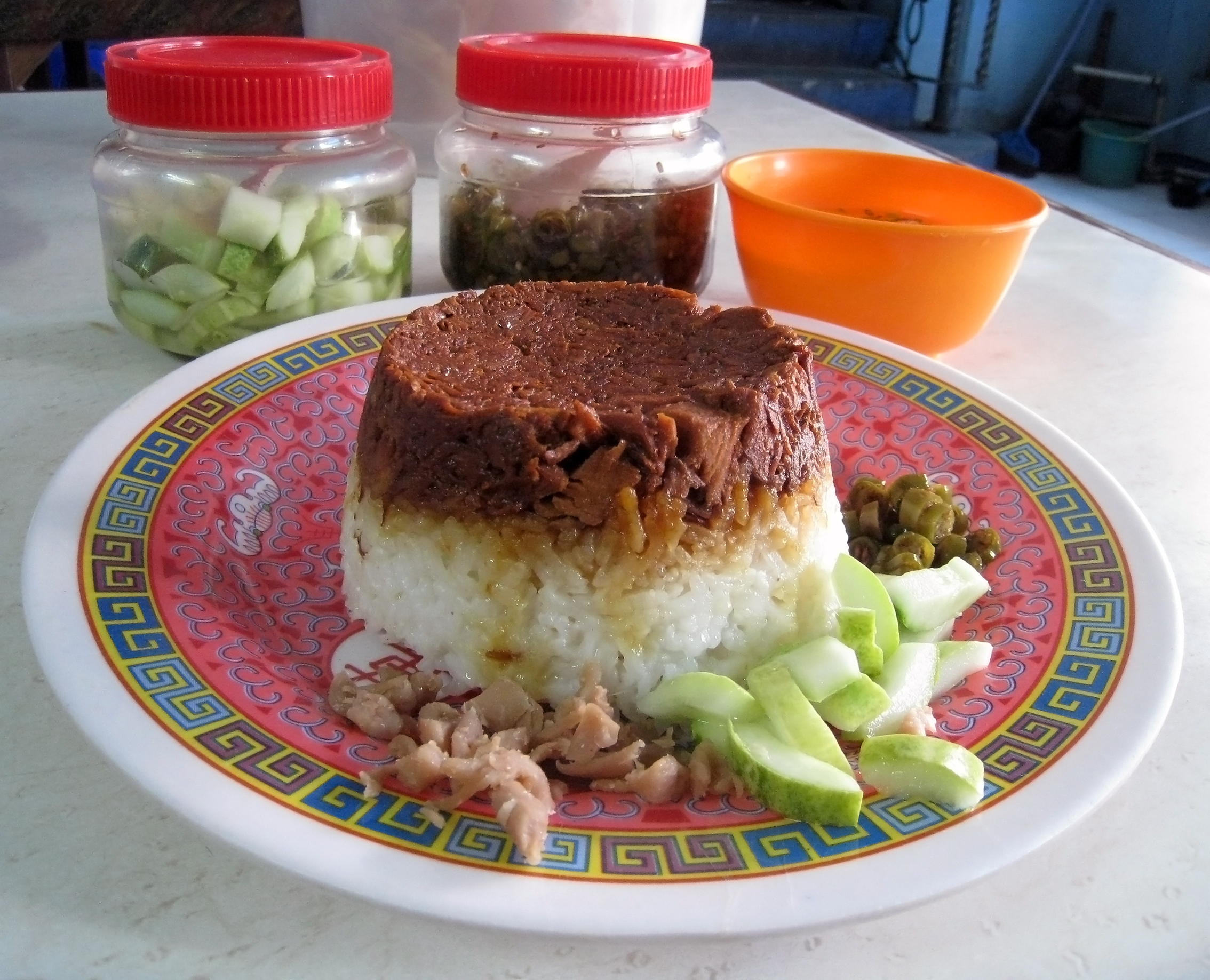
Nasi tim ayam, steamed chicken rice

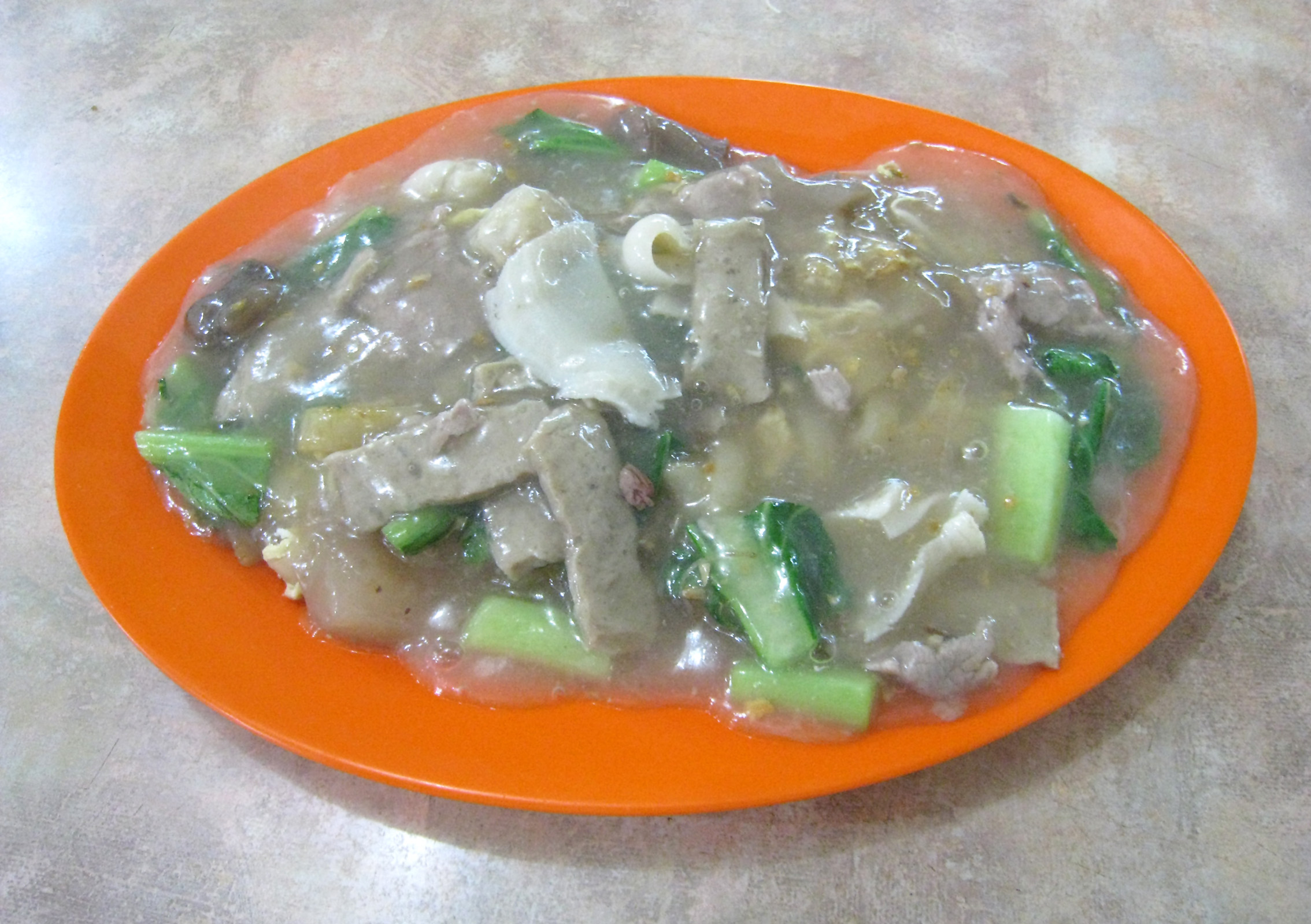
Kwetiau siram with beef

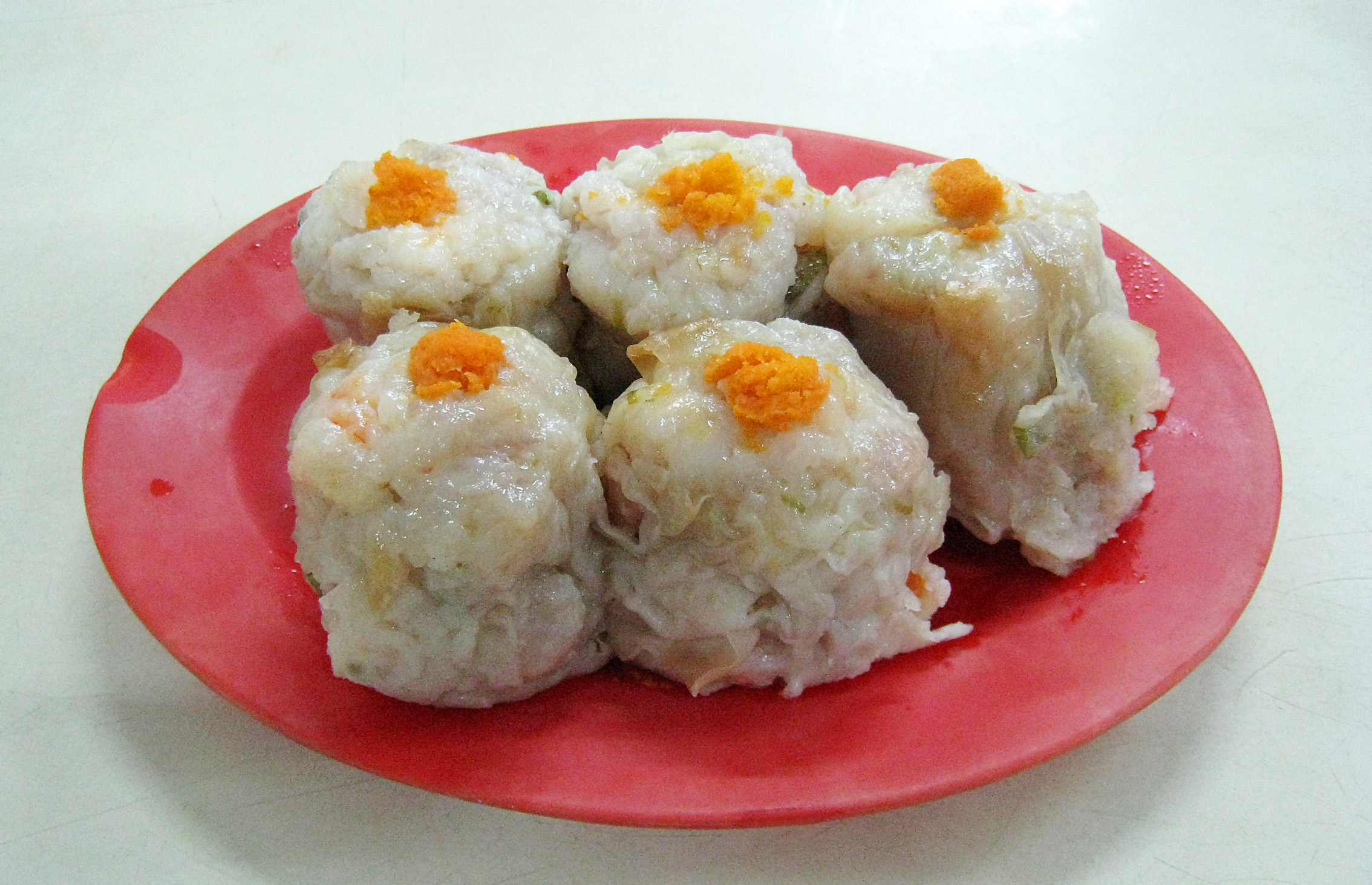
Shrimp siomay

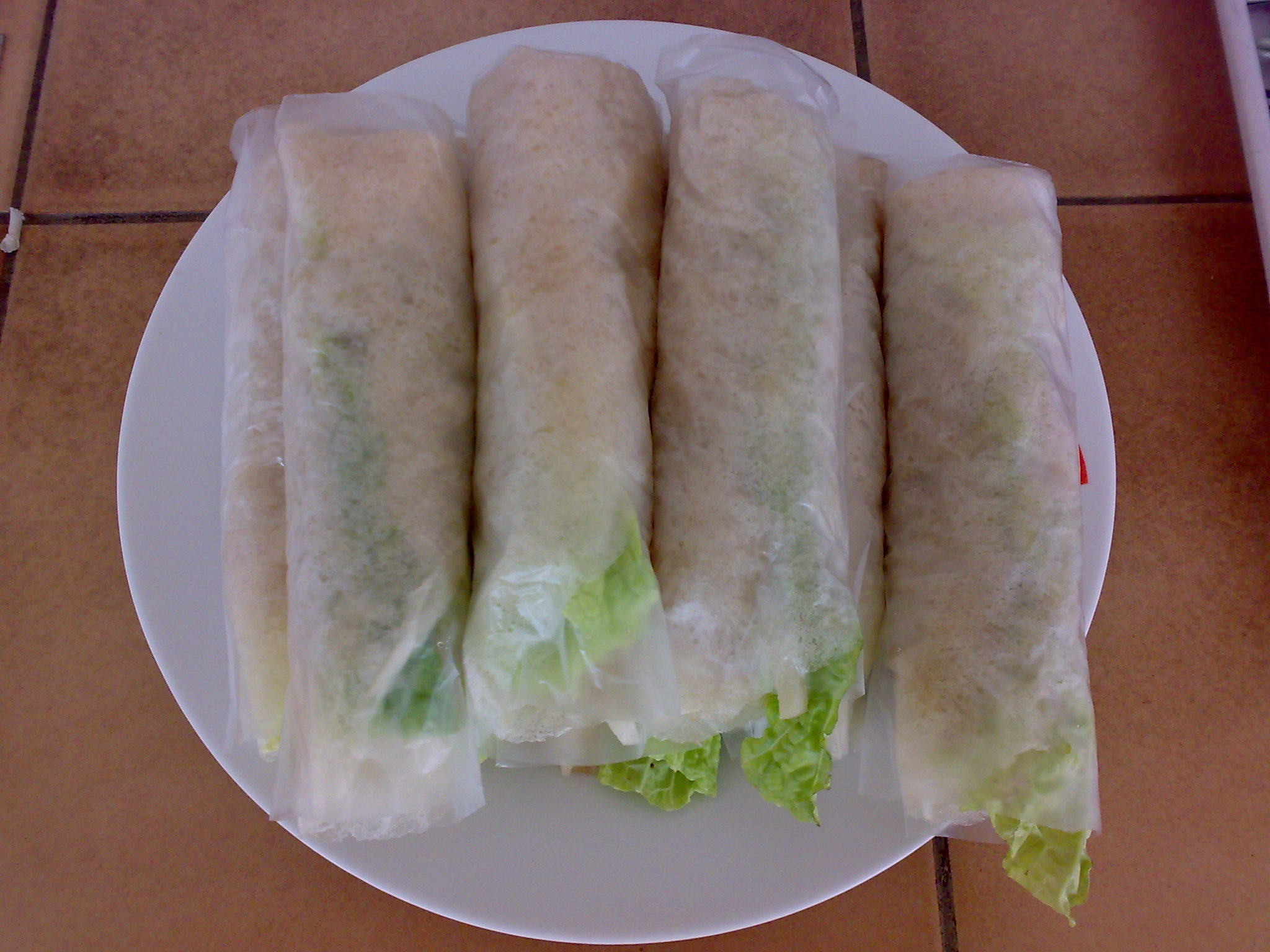
Fresh lumpia

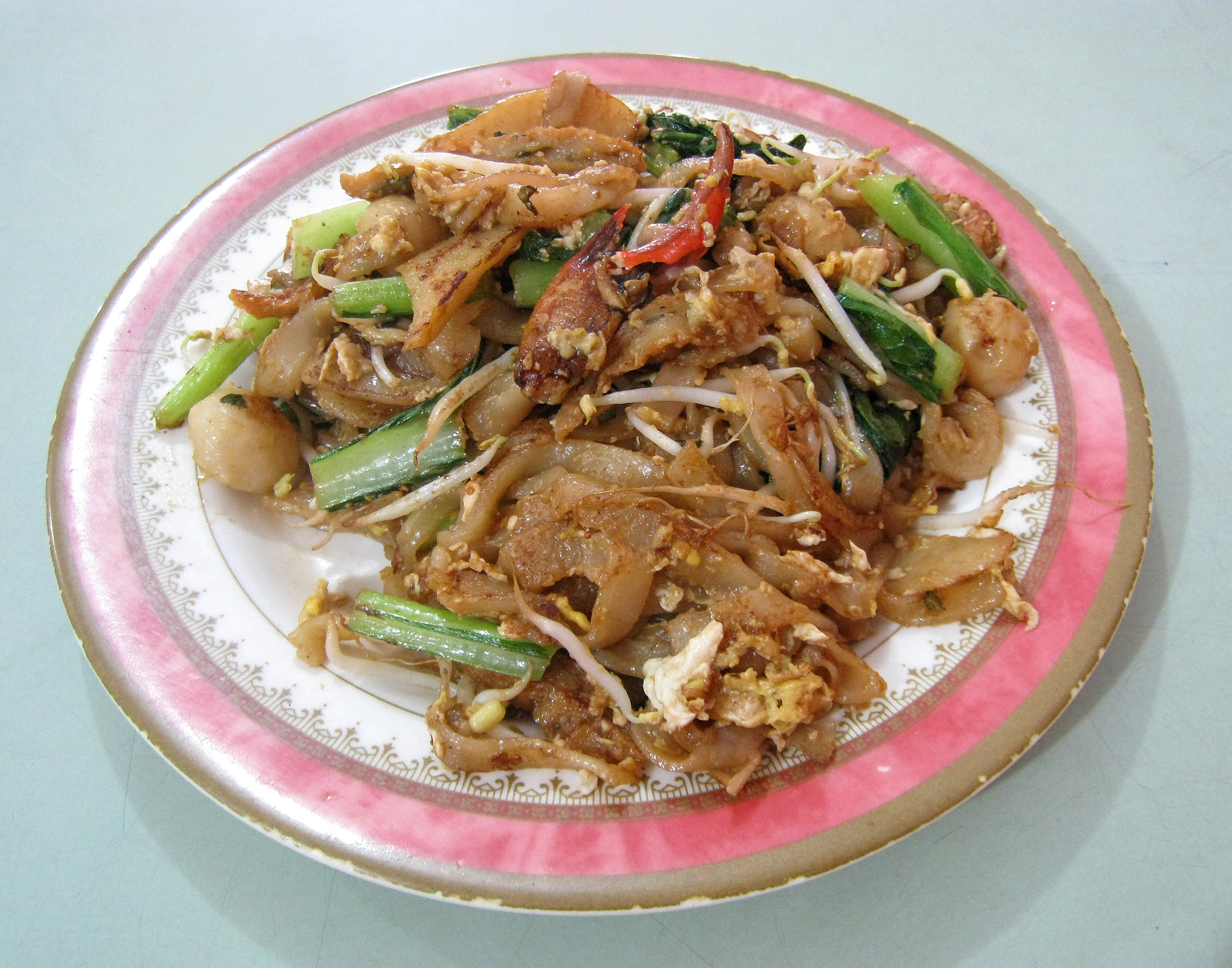
Kwetiau goreng with crab

Chinese influences are evident in Indonesian food. The Chinese cooking style that has influenced Indonesian cuisine was mainly Hokkien cuisine. Popular Chinese Indonesian foods include bakmi, mie ayam, pangsit, bakso, lumpia, kwetiau goreng and mie goreng.

Chinese culinary culture is particularly evident in Indonesian cuisine through the Hokkien, Hakka, and Cantonese loanwords used for various dishes. Words beginning with bak (肉) signify the presence of meat, e.g. bakpau ("meat bun"); words ending with cai (菜) signify vegetables, e.g. pecai ("Chinese white cabbage") and cap cai ("mixed vegetables"). Also mi or mie (麵) signify noodle as in mie goreng ("fried noodle").

Most of these loanwords for food dishes and their ingredients are Hokkien in origin and are used throughout the Indonesian language and vernacular speech of large cities. Because they have become an integral part of the local language, many Indonesians and ethnic Chinese do not recognize their Hokkien origins. Some of popular Indonesian dishes such as nasi goreng, mie goreng, bihun, kwetiau, lumpia and bakpia can trace their origin to Chinese influence. Some food and ingredients are part of the daily diet of both the indigenous and ethnic Chinese populations as side dishes to accompany rice, the staple food of most of the country.

Chinese influence is so evident in cities with large Chinese settlements since colonial era, especially in Jakarta, Cirebon, Semarang, Surabaya, Medan, Batam, Bangka, Palembang, Singkawang and Pontianak. As the result numbers of mi (noodle) and tahu (tofu) recipes were developed in these cities. Chinese influence is so evident in Betawi people (native Jakartans) cuisines that basically was formed as peranakan culture, as the result Betawi people held Chinese Indonesians dishes such as asinan and rujak juhi as theirs. To a certain extent, Javanese in Semarang, Solo, and Surabaya also willingly absorbs Chinese culinary influences, as the result they also considered Chinese-influenced dishes such as mie goreng, lumpia, bakso, and tahu gunting as theirs.

Because food is so prevalent in Chinese culture as Chinese families often allocate their quality time to go eating out—just like banquet customs commonly found in Chinese communities worldwide—many Pecinan (Chinatowns) in Indonesian cities are well known as the culinary hot spots of the city, with rows of shops and restaurants. As Chinese and also native Indonesians establishing their food business, many eating establishments sprung up, from humble street side cart hawker to fancy restaurants offering their specialty. Areas such as Glodok, Pecenongan, and Kelapa Gading in Jakarta, Kesawan, Pusat Pasar, Jalan Semarang, Asia Mega Mas, Cemara Asri and Sunggal in Medan, Cibadak and Gardujati / Gardu Jati in Bandung, Kya-kya Kembang Jepun in Surabaya, and Pecinans in Cirebon, Semarang and Solo teem with many warungs, shops and restaurants, not only offering Chinese Indonesian dishes, but also local and international cuisines.

== Adaptation to local cuisine ==
Indonesian Chinese cuisine also varies with location. For example, in different parts of Java the dishes are adapted to local culture and taste; in return, Chinese Indonesians residing in this region also developed a taste for local cuisine. In central Java, the food tends to be much sweeter, while in West Java it is saltier. In East Java, Chinese food is more salty and savory with a preference of petis shrimp paste. In Medan, North Sumatra and also in Pontianak, West Kalimantan, a more traditional Chinese style can be found. Chinese cuisine in Indonesia also has absorbed the local preferences for spicy food and local ingredients. For example, it is common to have sambal chili sauce, acar pickles and sprinkles of bawang goreng crispy fried shallot as condiments.

Chinese cuisine influences on Indonesian cuisine are evident in Indonesian takes on Chinese dishes, such as mie goreng, lumpia, bakso and siomay. However, Chinese Indonesian food has also been influenced by native Indonesian cuisine. It is believed that lontong cap go meh is a Chinese Indonesian take on traditional Indonesian dishes. The dish reflects the assimilation of Chinese immigrants with the local community.

Because Indonesia is a Muslim-majority country, some ingredients were replaced to create halal Chinese food; pork is replaced with chicken or beef, and lard is replaced with palm oil or chicken fat. Most Chinese eating establishments with significant Muslim native Indonesian clientele do so. However, in Chinatowns in major Indonesian cities where there is significant Chinese and non-Muslim population, Chinese restaurants that serve pork dishes such as babi kecap (pork belly in soy sauce), char siew, crispy roast pork, sweet pork sausage and sate babi (pork satay) are available.

There are different styles of Chinese food in Indonesia:

- Traditional Chinese food, such as Teochew, Hokkian, Hakka dishes.
- Chinese-Indonesian food with recipes borrowed from local Indonesian cuisine, Dutch cuisine and other European cuisine.
- Chinese dishes adapted to the local culture and taste, as by replacing pork with chicken or beef to make it halal.
- New-style Chinese food with chefs from China, Hong Kong or Taiwan.

== List of Chinese Indonesian food ==
Most of the time, the name of Chinese Indonesian foods are preserved from its original Chinese Hokkien name (e.g. bakmi, bakpau, locupan, lumpia, swikee). However, sometimes the name are derived from the translation of its meanings, ingredients or process in Indonesian (e.g. babi kecap, kakap asam manis, kembang tahu, nasi tim).

=== Dishes ===
Chinese-Indonesian Cuisine

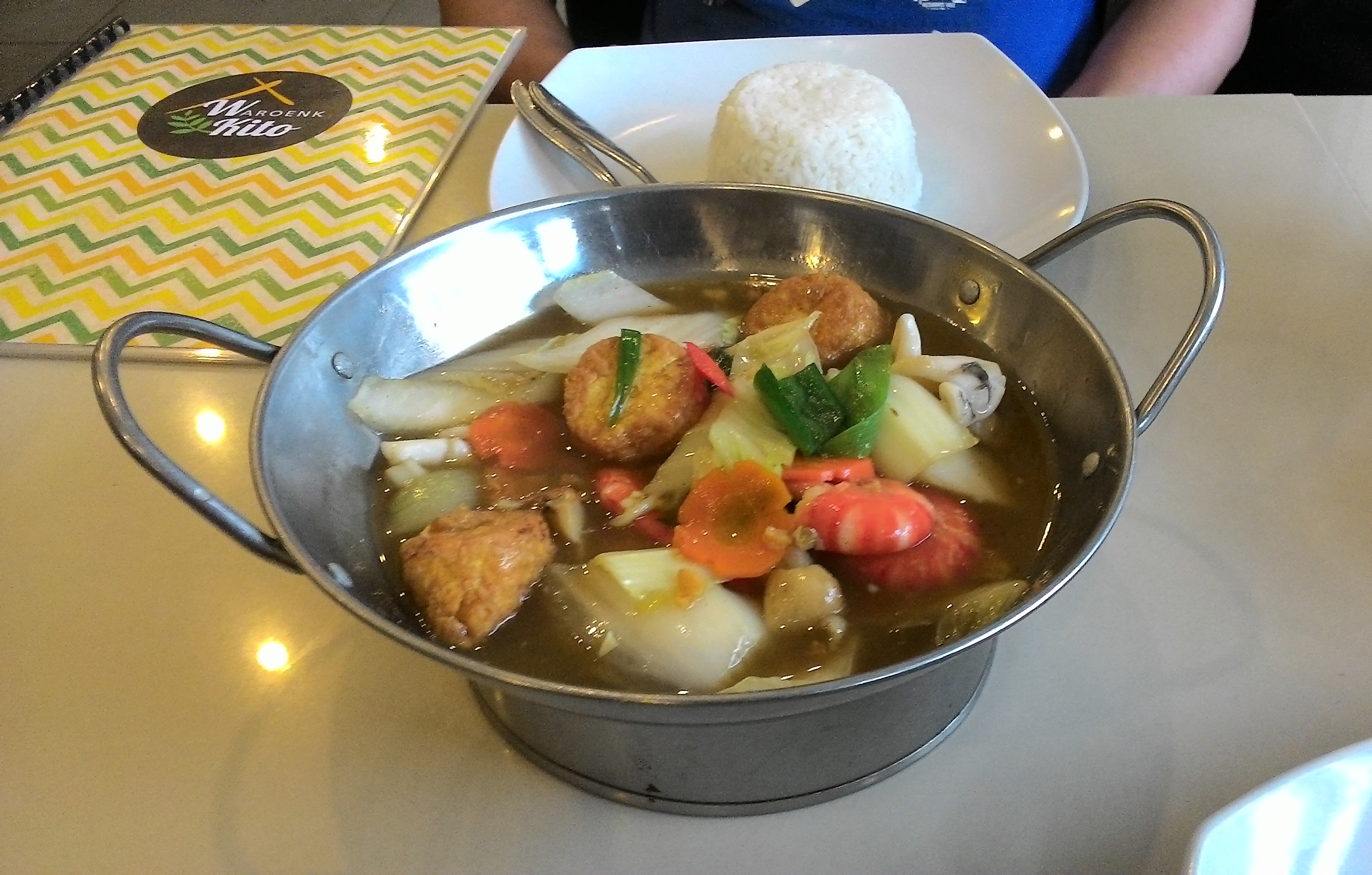
Sapo tahu seafood

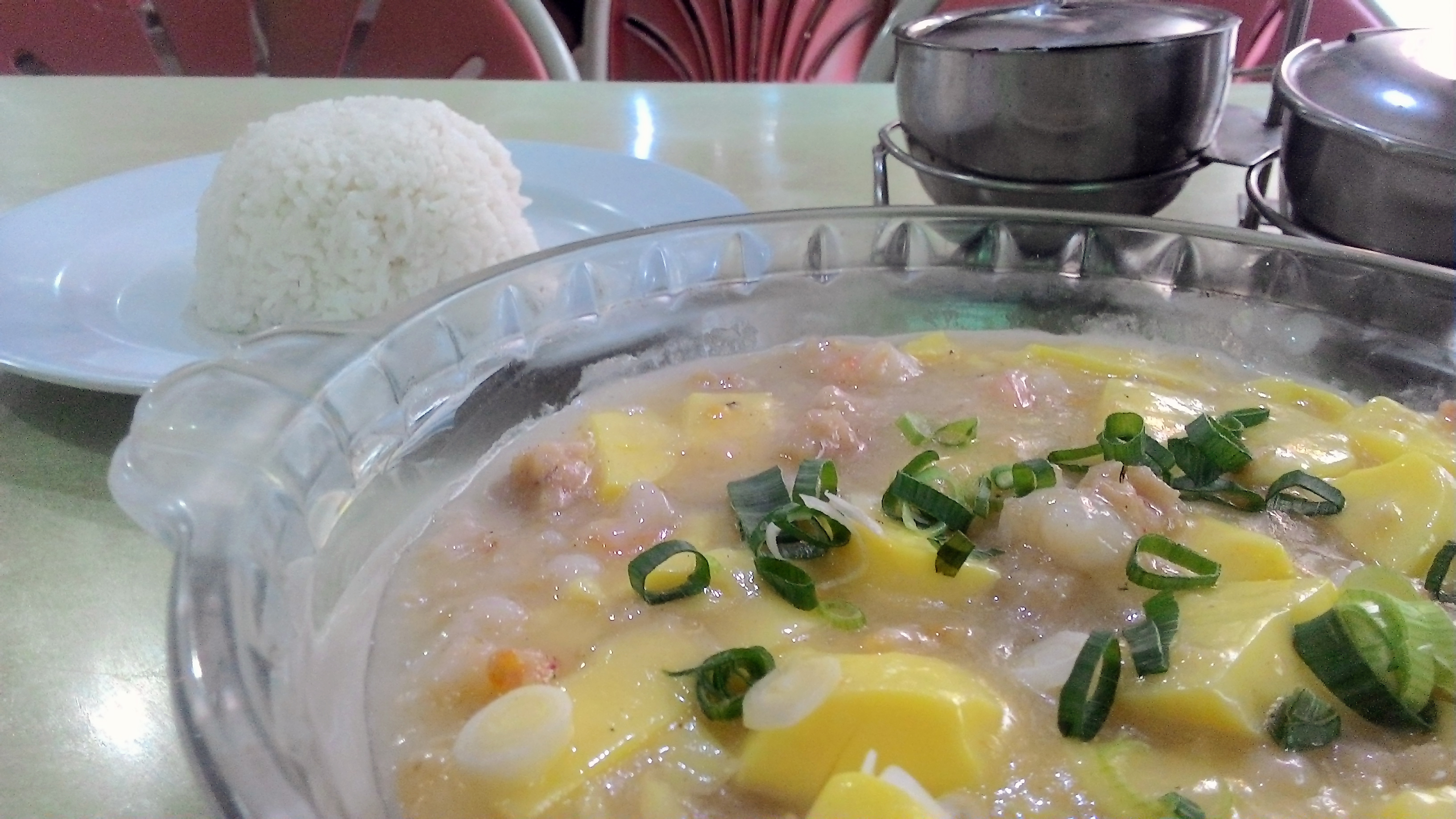
Mun tahu

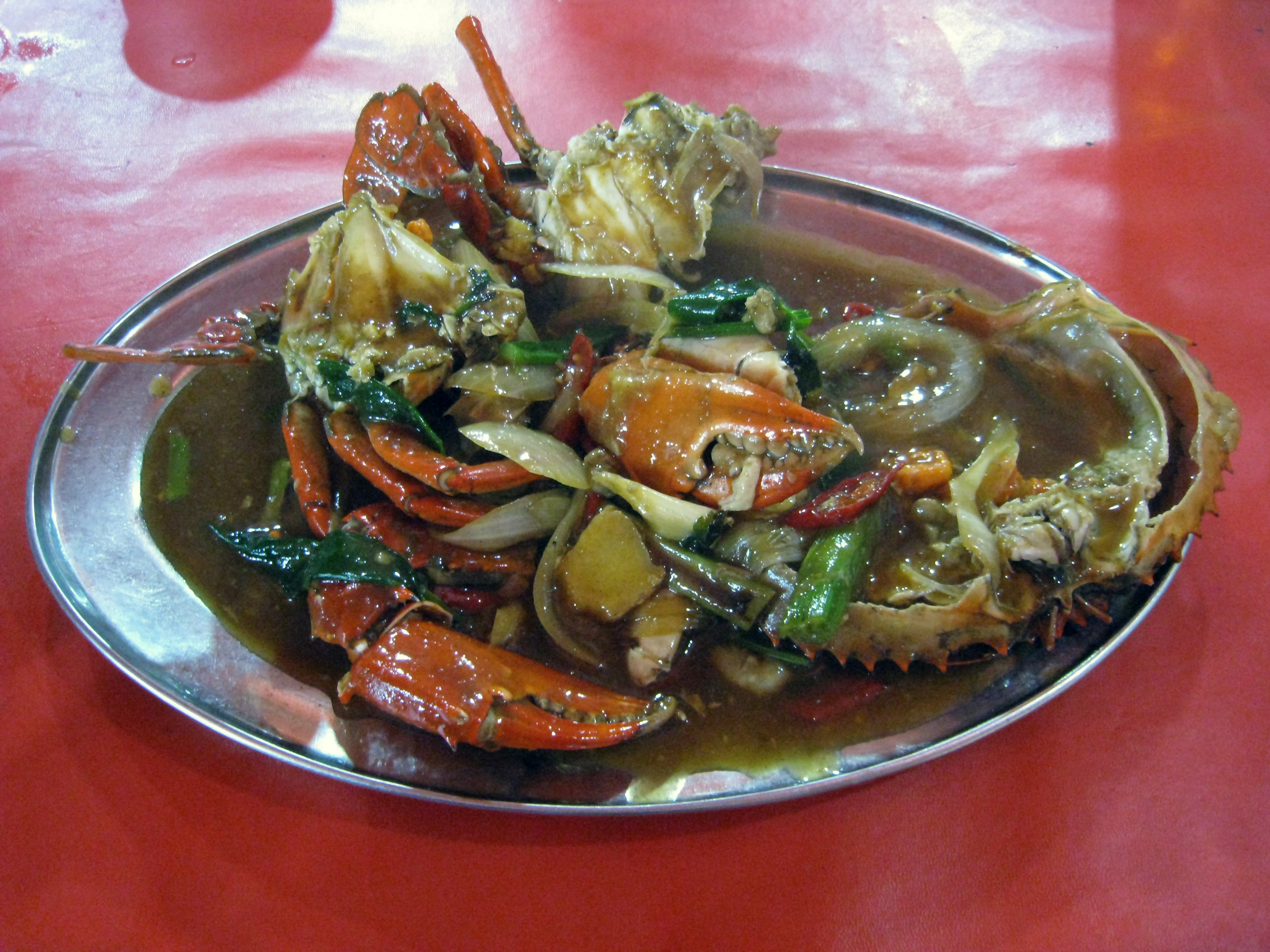
Kepiting saus tiram

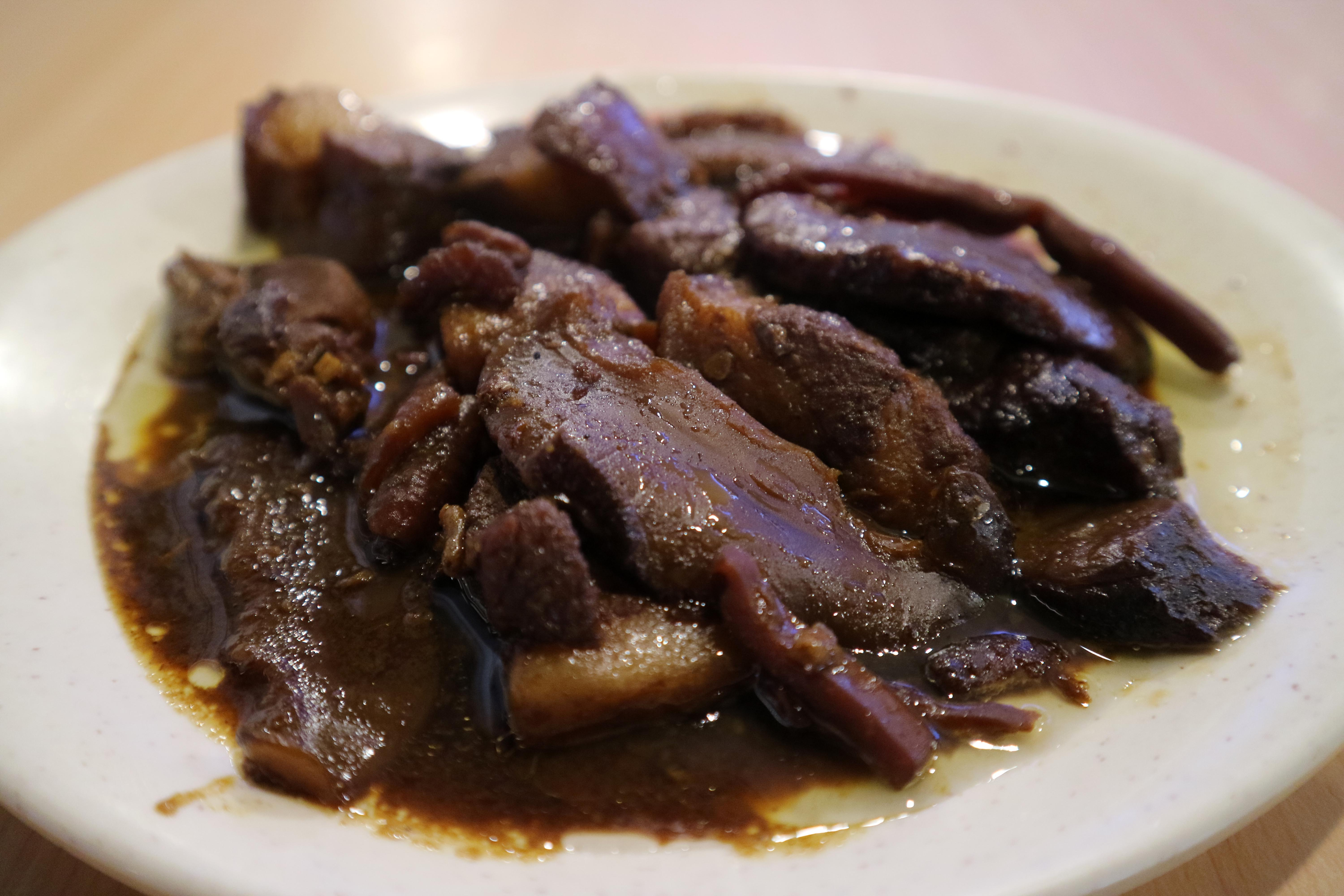
Babi hong, pork braised in soy sauce and spices

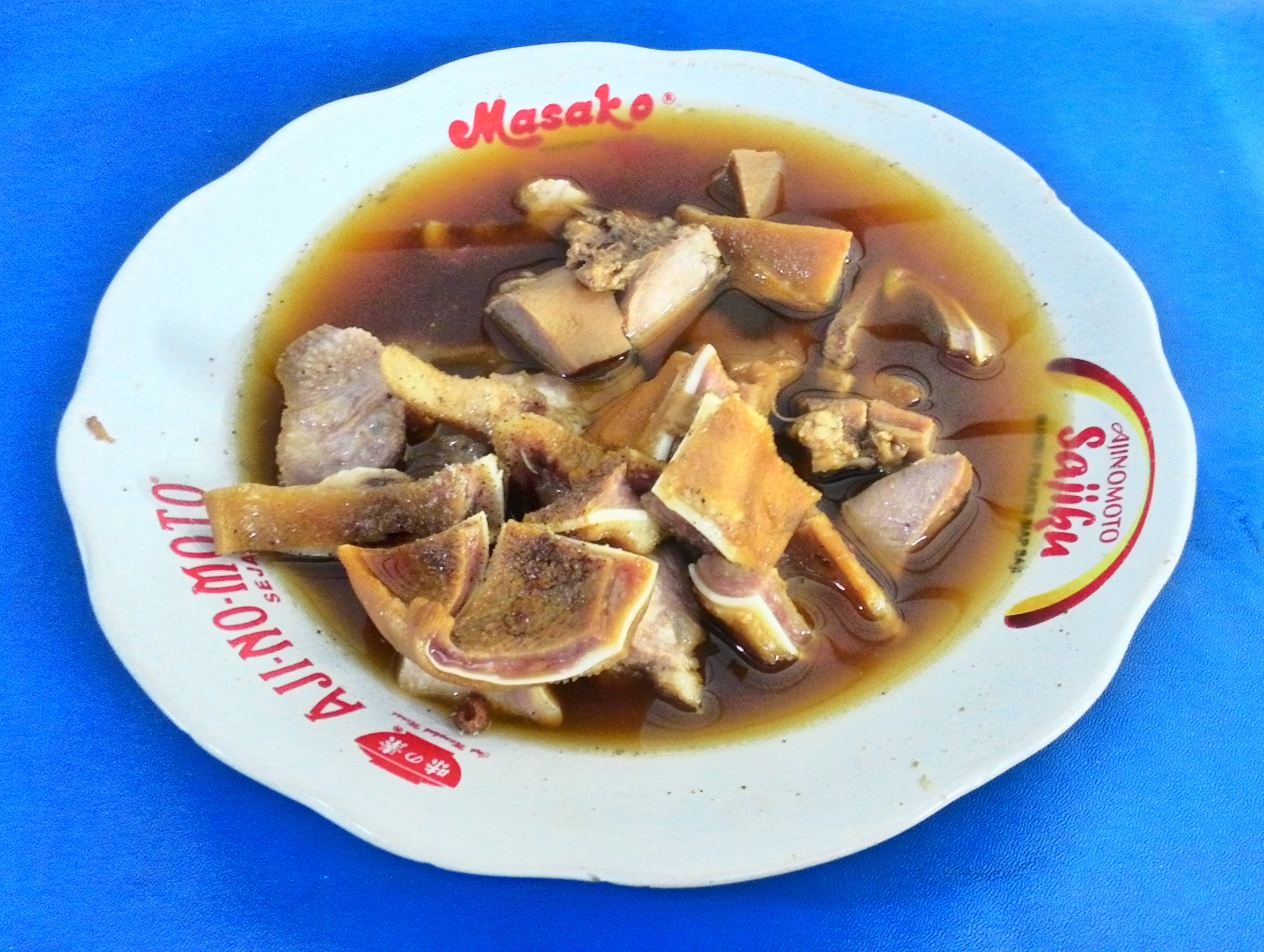
Sekba, pork offals

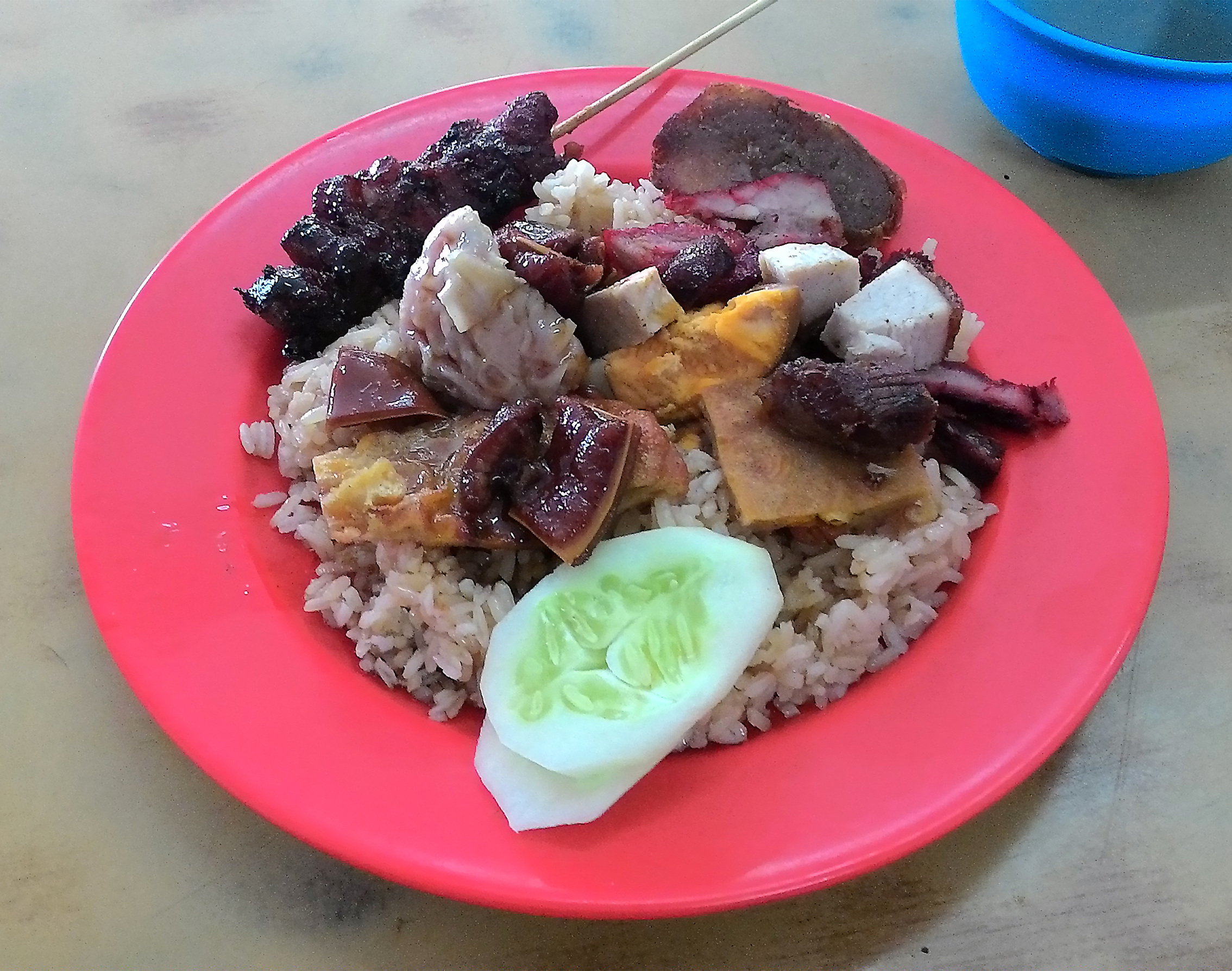
Nasi campur Chinese Indonesian version

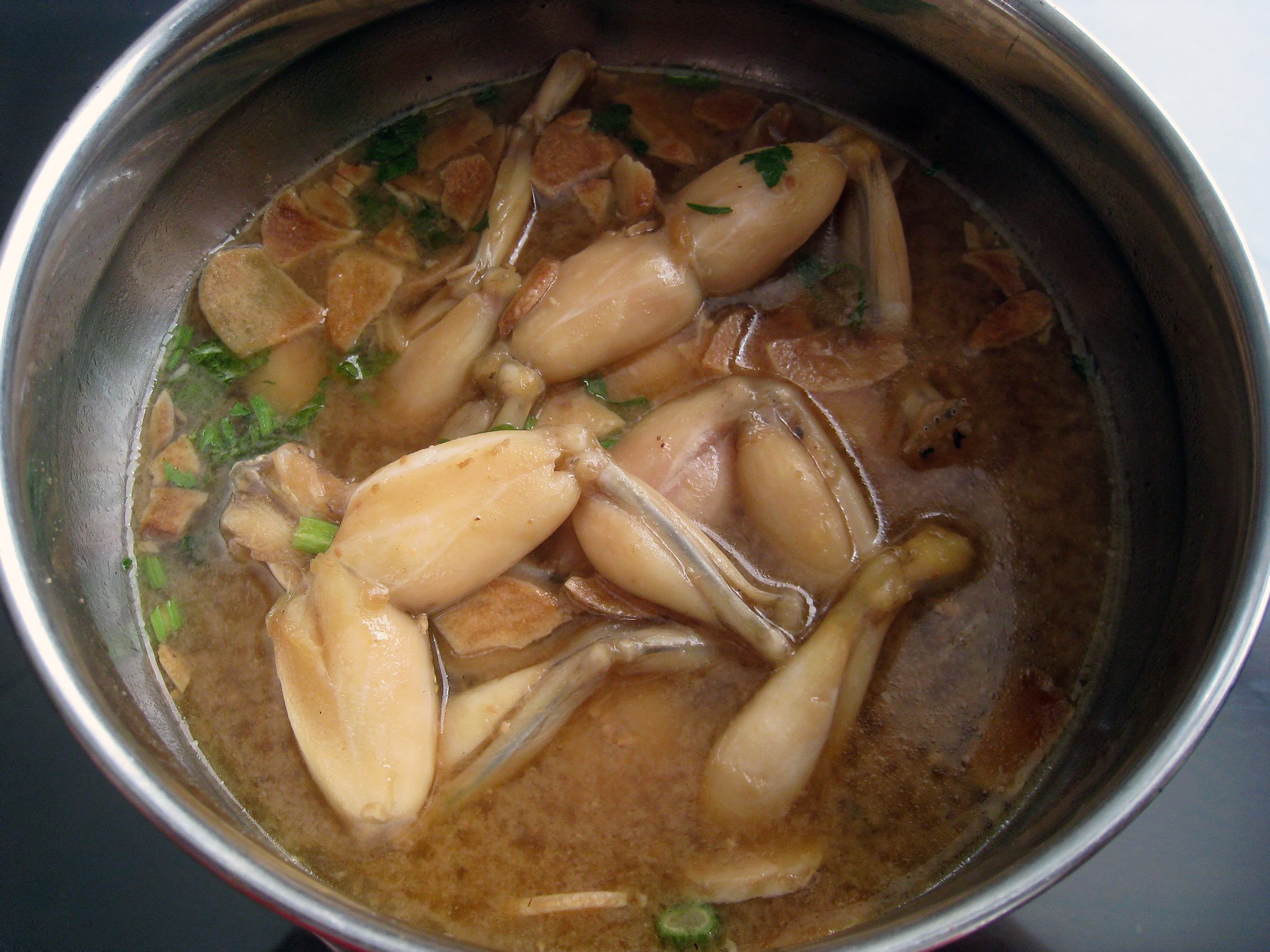
Swikee kodok oh, frog legs in Tauco soup

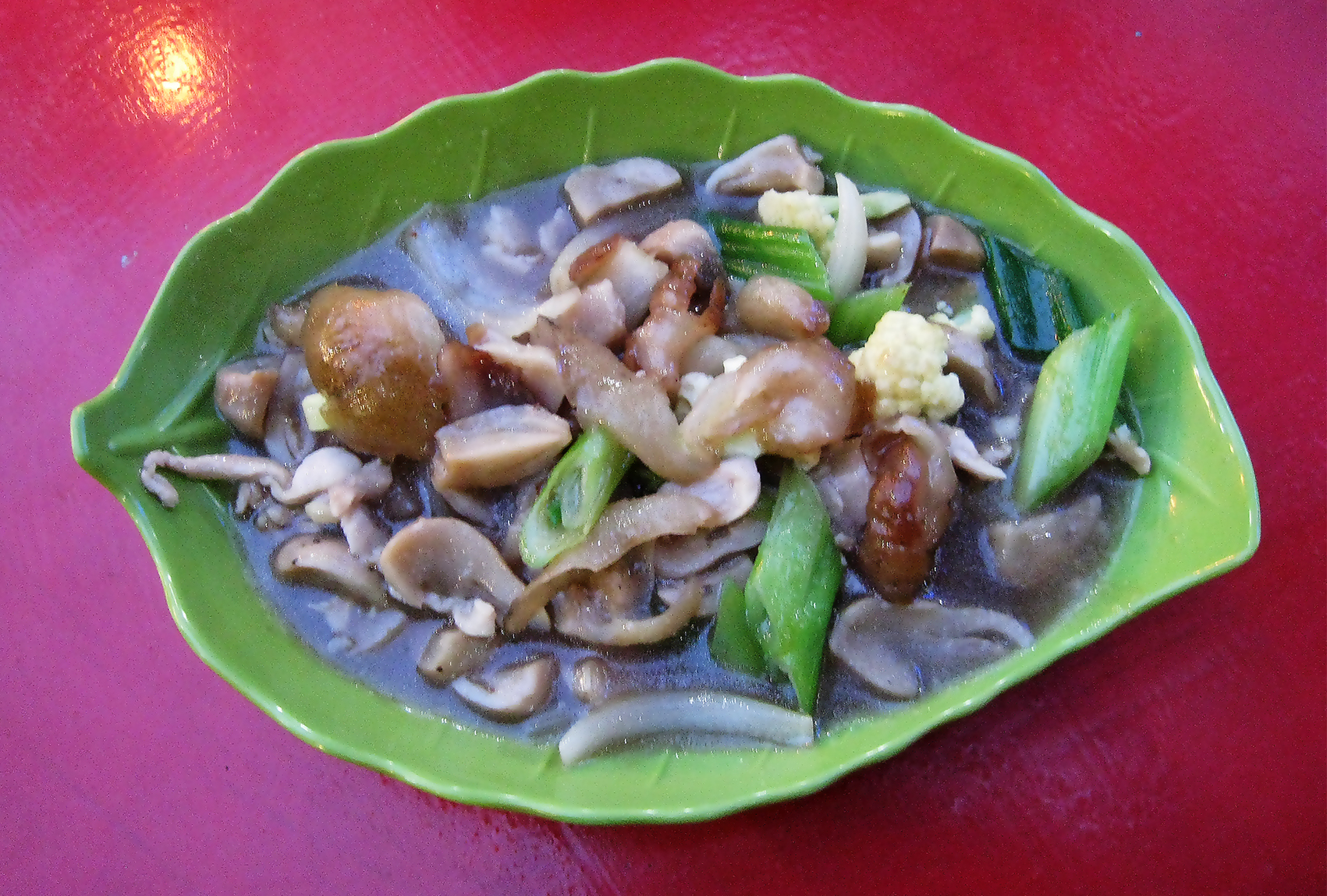
Haisom with mushroom

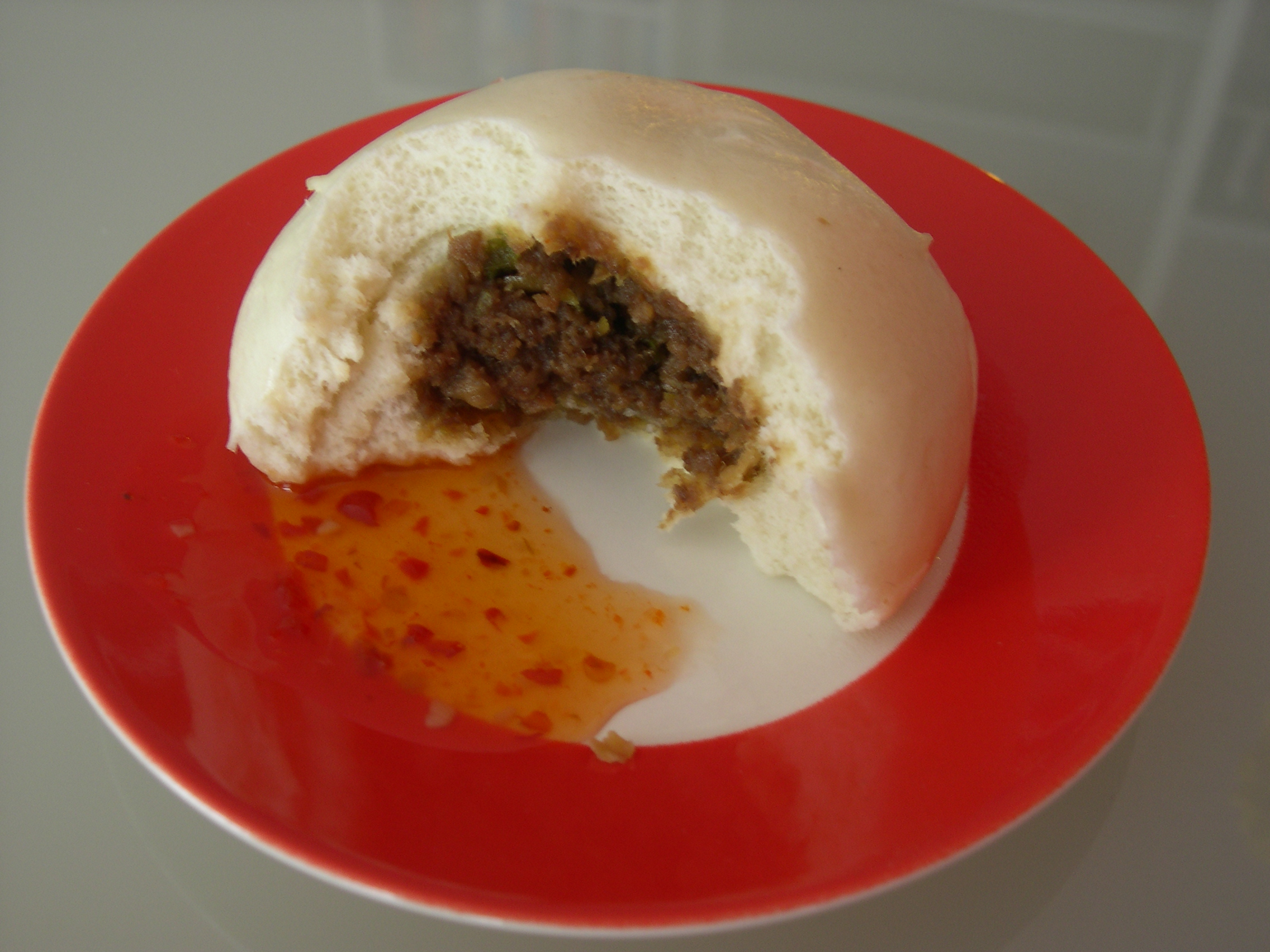
Bakpau

- Asinan, cured brined preserved vegetables in thin peanut sauce with krupuk mie.
- Ayam kluyuk or koloke (咕嚕雞), chicken in sweet and sour sauce.
- Babi hong, pork belly cooked in various Chinese seasonings and sauces; including several types of soy sauces, oyster sauces and cooking wine.
- Babi kecap, pork belly in kecap manis (sweet soy sauce) and spices.
- Bakcang or bacang (肉粽), glutinous rice stuffed with meat (usually pork) and wrapped in bamboo leaf in triangular (more precisely, tetrahedral) form.
- Bak kut teh (肉骨茶), pork rib soup made with a variety of herbs and spices.
- Bakkwa (肉乾), lit. dried meat; dried meat product similar to jerky or dendeng.
- Bakmi (肉麵), bak-mie comes from the Hokkien pronunciation for 'meat-noodles'; noodles which are adapted to different styles and regions. Each city has its own recipe for noodles or mie, e.g. Bakmi Jawa, Bakmi Siantar, Bakmi Medan, Bakmi Makassar, Bakmi Bangka, etc.
- Bakpau (肉包), Indonesian Chinese-style steamed bun, stuffed with chicken, meat (usually pork), sweetened mung beans or red beans paste.
- Bakso (肉酥), bak-so is the Hokkien pronunciation for 'shredded-meat'), beef or chicken meatballs, usually served in a bowl of broth and other ingredients.
- Bakso ikan, meatball made of fish. Just like bakso, bakso ikan served in a bowl of broth and other ingredients.
- Bakwan (肉丸), bak-wan is the Hokkien pronunciation for 'meat-ball'; fried meal consisting of vegetables, batter and sometimes beef.
- Banmian (板麵), handmade flat noodles served in a soup.
- Bihun goreng, fried thin rice noodle with spices and chili darkened with sweet soy sauce.
- Bihun kepala ikan, noodle soup in which the main ingredients are rice vermicelli and a deep fried fish head cut into chunks.
- Bihun kuah, rice vermicelli soup dish.
- Bubur ayam, a shredded chicken congee.
- Cakwe (炸粿), Chinese cruller or fried long bread, served with sweet, sour and spicy dipping sauce.
- Cap cai (雜菜), named from the Hokkien word for a mixture of various types of vegetables; mixed vegetables that usually served as stir-fried mixed vegetables with chicken when ordered as à la carte.
- Chai thau kue (菜頭粿), dim sum with main ingredients steamed rice flour and shredded white daikon.
- Cha kwe tiau (炒粿條), stir fried rice noodles with bean sprouts, prawns, eggs (duck or chicken), chives and thin slices of preserved Chinese sausages. This noodle dish similar to kwetiau goreng.
- Cha sio (叉燒), barbecued pork, usually served with rice, eggs, and cucumber, commonly found in Medan
- Fu yung hai or pu yung hai (芙蓉蛋), is a type of omelet filled with vegetables and meat (usually crab meat, shrimp or minced chicken) served in sweet and sour sauce.
- Haisom cah (炒海參), stir fried trepang with garlic, onion, hioko mushroom, scallion, minced chicken, soy sauce and oyster sauce.
- I fu mie (伊府麵), dried noodle in thick sauce with meat or seafood.
- Ikan malas tim, steamed "lazy fish" or betutu fish (marble goby) in ginger and soy sauce.
- Kakap asam manis, red snapper in sweet and sour sauce.
- Kakap tahu tausi, red snapper with tofu and douchi in tauco sauce.
- Kari kepala ikan, fish head curry dish.
- Kekian, minced prawn roll (sometimes replaced with fish or chicken), mixed with tapioca, egg, garlic, salt, and pepper. Similar to ngo hiong, but with a simpler seasoning without five-spice powder. Could be steamed or fried and eaten by itself, or sliced and stir-fried mixed in other dishes such as cap cai.
- Kepiting saus tiram, crab in oyster sauce.
- Kwetiau ayam, boiled flat noodle (shahe fen) with diced chicken.
- Kwetiau goreng, fried flat noodle similar to char kuay teow.
- Kwetiau siram sapi, flat noodle with beef in thick gravy.
- Kuping babi kecap, pork ear in sweet soy sauce.
- Laksa, spicy noodle soup of Peranakan cuisine, such as Palembang, Betawi, Bogor and Medan laksa. This noodle dish also prominent in neighboring Malaysia and Singapore.
- Lapchiong (臘腸), a Chinese sausage with various types that used as ingredient such as in kwetiau goreng.
- Lindung cah fumak, eel with stir fried Indian lettuce and fermented red rice.
- Lumpia (潤餅), a fresh spring roll of Hokkien/Chaozhou-style origin.
- Lontong cap go meh, lontong in rich coconut milk with chicken opor ayam, liver in chilli, sayur lodeh, and telur pindang (marbled egg). A Chinese Indonesian take on Indonesian cuisines dishes served during festive Cap Go Meh.
- Locupan (老鼠粄), a Chinese Indonesian name for lao shu fen, short "rat's tail-like" noodle.
- Mie ayam, chicken noodle, yellow wheat noodle topped with diced chicken meat, seasoned with soy sauce, and usually served with a chicken broth soup.
- Mie campur or bakmie campur, assorted meat noodle; yellow wheat noodle topped with an assortment of Chinese barbecue, such as Char Siew, crispy roast pork and sweet pork sausage. Noodle counterpart of Chinese Indonesian nasi campur.
- Mie goreng, fried noodle with spices and chili darkened with sweet soy sauce.
- Mie hokkien (福建麵), stir-fried or soupy noodle dish made of egg noodles and rice noodles.
- Mie kering, dried noodle in thick sauce.
- Lomie (滷麵), a bowl of thick yellow noodles served in a thickened gravy made from eggs, starch, and pork stock.
- Mie pangsit, thin egg noodles with wonton dumplings.
- Mie rebus, boiled noodle.
- Mie tarik (拉麵), lit. "pulled noodle"; a local name for la mien.
- Mie yamin or Yamien, chicken noodle in sweet soy sauce, similar to mie ayam but with sweeter taste acquired from kecap manis.
- Mun tahu (燜豆腐), silken tofu with shrimp and minced chicken braised in thick white sauce.
- Nasi ayam or Nasi Hainan, a rice dish that consisting of poached chicken and seasoned rice, served with chilli sauce and usually with cucumber garnishes.
- Nasi bebek, a rice dish made of either braised or roasted duck and plain white rice.
- Nasi campur (Chinese Indonesian version), it is rice with an assortment of Chinese barbecue, such as Char Siew, crispy roast pork, sweet pork sausage and pork satay.
- Nasi goreng, fried rice with spices and chili, often add kecap manis, but another variant may differ.
- Nasi tim, steamed chicken rice served with chicken broth.
- Ngo hiang (五香) or lor bak (滷肉), minced meat roll (pork, chicken, fish or prawn) seasoned with five-spice powder.
- Otak-otak (烏達烏達), steamed and grilled fish cake in banana leaf package, made of fish meat and spices served with spicy peanut sauce.
- Pangsit (扁食), wonton filled with vegetables, chicken or shrimp.
  - Pangsit goreng, fried wonton.
  - Pangsit kuah, wet wonton in a broth or gravy.
- Pau (包), which is the Chinese word for 'bun'; sometimes written as Bak-Pau (肉包), literally meaning 'Meat-Bun', which is a bun with meat fillings. (Bak is the Hokkien pronunciation for 'meat'.)
- ‘’Pek Cam Kee’’’ (白切鸡), marinated steamed white chicken
- Pempek, a savoury fishcake made of softly ground wahoo fish and tapioca served with spicy vinegar and palm sugar sauce. Specialty of Palembang city. According to the local legend, the name derived from ah pek to call the elderly Chinese man that invented and sold the dish.
- Popiah (薄餅), a large fresh unfried spring roll akin to lumpia.
- Rujak juhi or mie juhi, similar to asinan, cured brined preserved vegetables in thin peanut sauce with krupuk mi, but with addition of yellow noodle and juhi (salted cuttlefish).
- Rujak Shanghai, preserved seafood and jellyfish with vegetables and sweet and sour sauce.
- Sate babi, pork satay can be found in Chinatowns in Indonesian cities, especially around Glodok, Pecenongan, and Senen in the Jakarta area. It is also popular in Bali which the majority are Hindus, and also popular in The Netherlands.
- Sapo tahu (砂鍋豆腐), tofu in claypot, Sa-Po which is the Chinese word for 'clay pot' (砂鍋), the most popular variant is sapo tahu; silken egg tofu with vegetables, chicken or seafood, cooked in a clay pot to keep it warm.
- Sekba or bektim, a traditional Chinese soup mainly consists of pork offals (intestine, tripe, lung, liver, heart, tongue, ear, and nose), with egg, tofu and salted vegetables, served in a spiced broth.
- Siomay (燒賣), steamed finely ground fish dumplings, similar to Chinese dim sum, but Indonesian version usually served in spicy peanut sauce.
- Soto, is a traditional soup mainly composed of broth, meat and vegetables.
- Soto mi, is a spicy noodle soup dish.
- Sup hisit (魚翅湯), shark fin soup.
- Sup ikan bihun, soup-based seafood dish served hot made of rice vermicelli and fish.
- Sup sarang burung, edible bird's nest soup.
- Swikee (水雞), a dish of frog legs.
- Tahu (豆腐), tau-hu comes from the Chinese word for 'bean curd'), a fermented soy food.
- Tahu Bandung or tahu yun yi, firm but soft tofu with yellow skin coated with turmeric, a specialty of Bandung city. Usually served fried or stir fried.
- Tahu goreng, fried tofu with peanut sauce or sweet soy sauce with chopped chili.
- Tahu tauco, tofu in tauco sauce.
- Tauge ayam, bean sprouts chicken with soya sauce.
- Tauge tahu, sometimes shortened to ge-hu, stir fried bean sprout and tofu.
- Tee long pan, rice noodle roll served with red chili sauce, crushed roasted-peanuts, fried onions, and dried shrimp.
- Telur asin (鹹蛋), salted duck egg.
- Telur dadar tiram, omelette with a filling primarily composed of small oysters.
- Telur pitan (皮蛋), black-colored preserved duck egg.
- Telur teh (茶葉蛋), tea egg.
- Telur tim, steamed egg.
- Terang bulan/Martabak manis, a pancake made from a mixture of flour, eggs, sugar, baking soda, coconut milk, and water cooked upon a thick round iron frying pan in plenty of palm margarine, then sprinkled with filings such as crushed peanut granules, sugar, chocolate sprinkles, sesame, and cheddar cheese, and then folded.
- Tim daging, steamed minced meat (usually pork) and eggs.
- Yong tau fu (釀豆腐), a tofu dish that consisting primarily of tofu filled with ground meat mixture or fish paste.
- Yusheng or yee sang (魚生), fresh fish salad with sliced vegetables, such as carrot and turnips. Usually served during Chinese New Year.

=== Desserts and sweets ===
- Bakpia (肉餅), sweet mung bean-filled pastry from Fujian origin. In Indonesia, it is also widely known as bakpia Pathok, named after a suburb of Yogyakarta which specializes in the pastry.
- Cincau (青草), grass jelly drink served with shaved ice, coconut milk and sugar.
- Kembang tahu (豆花), soft tofu pudding in sweet ginger and sugar syrup.
- Kuaci (瓜子), edible dried and salted watermelon seed or sunflower seed.
- Kue bulan or tiong chu pia (中秋餅), the local name for Chinese mooncake.
- Kue keranjang or dodol cina; the local name for nian gao (年糕), the sweet treat of glutinous rice with palm sugar cake is locally known as dodol.
- Kue ku (龜粿), Chinese origin cake of sticky rice flour with sweet filling. The same as Chinese "Ang ku kueh" (Red Tortoise Cake).
- Kue moci (麻糬), glutinous rice filled with the peanut paste and covered with sesame seeds.
- Nopia, palm sugar-filled pastry smaller size than bak pia. In Indonesia it is associated with the town of Purbalingga and Banyumas in Central Java.
- Onde-onde, a fried glutinous rice ball filled with the peanut paste and covered with sesame seeds, local name for jin deui.
- Ronde, plain white or coloured sweet dumplings made from glutinous rice flour stuffed with peanut paste, floating in hot and sweet ginger and lemongrass tea.
- Sekoteng (四果湯), a ginger-based hot drink which includes peanuts, diced bread, and pacar cina, can be found in Jakarta, West Java, and Yogyakarta.

== See also ==
- Peranakan cuisine
