= Mun tahu =

Indonesian tofu soup dish

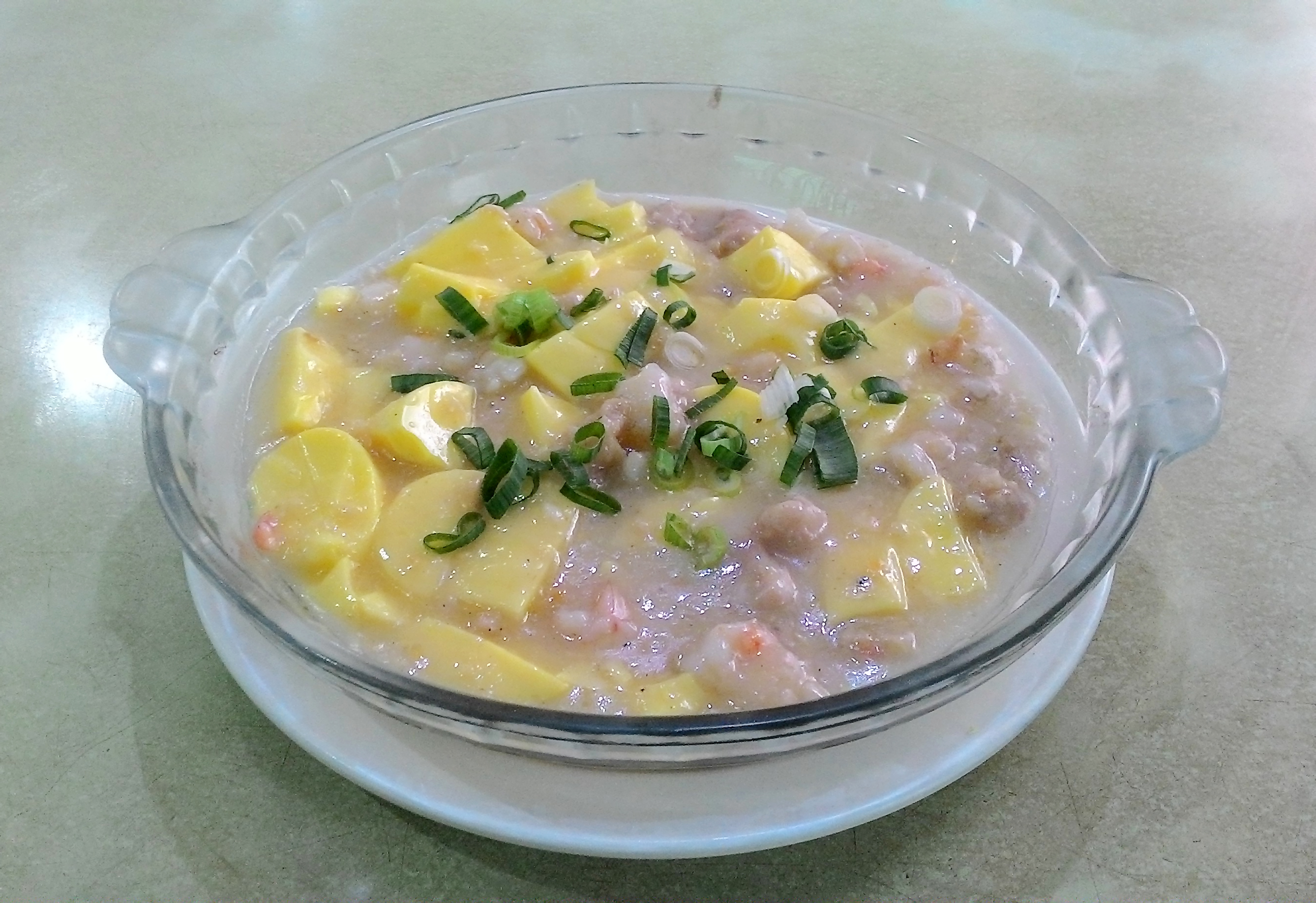
- Mun tahu, silken egg tofu with shrimp, chicken, leeks in thick savoury white sauce
- Course: Main course
- Place of origin: Indonesia
- Region or state: Southeast Asia
- Serving temperature: Hot
- Main ingredients: Silken egg tofu, vegetables, chicken or seafood

Mun tahu (Chinese: 燜豆腐 / 焖豆腐; pinyin: mèn dòufu'; lit. 'braised tofu') is Chinese Indonesian dish of soft tofu braised in savoury thick white sauce, mixed with minced chicken and shrimp.

== Etymology ==
The mun (Chinese: 燜/焖; lit. 'braised') cooking technique suggests that it is of Hakka origin. While tahu is tofu in Indonesian.

== Ingredients ==
Its main ingredient is soft and smooth silken tofu, or its variant the yellowish egg tofu, braised with meat and sprinkled with chopped leeks. It is mildly flavoured with garlic, ginger and onion, seasoned with small amount of soy sauce, salt and pepper. The colour of the sauce is whitish due to minimal addition of soy sauce. This white sauce is thickened using batter of tapioca powder or maize powder; resulting in a thick, slightly runny, gelatinized white sauce. Mun tahu usually also contains minced chicken or seafood, most commonly peeled shrimp, or sometimes minced beef or pork.

It has mildly savoury flavour with pleasantly soft texture, suitable for young children or adults in convalescence.

== See also ==
- Sapo tahu
- List of tofu dishes
- Mapo tofu
- Cap cai
- Tahu goreng
- Chinese Indonesian cuisine
