= Nasi tim =

Indonesian steamed chicken rice dish

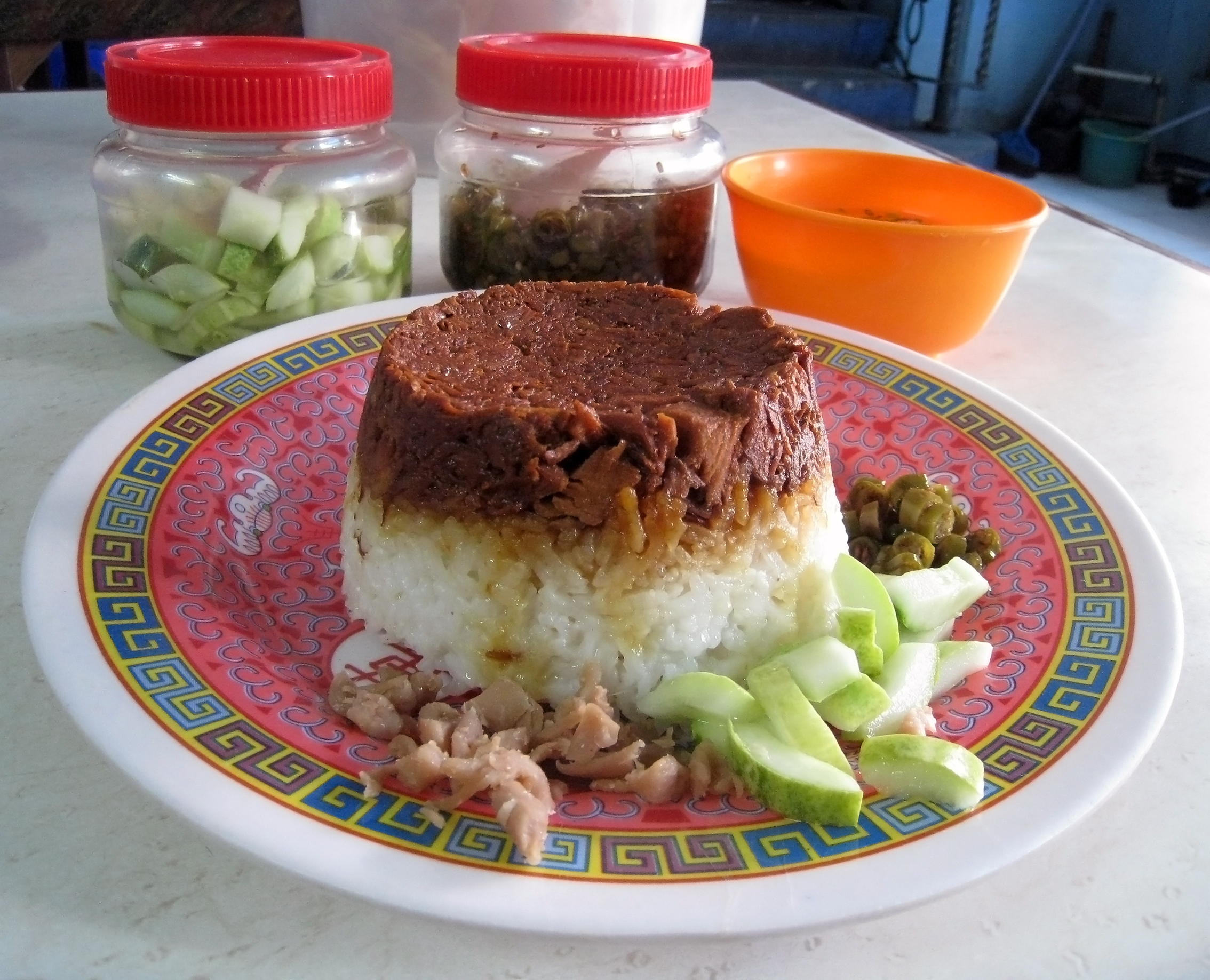
- Nasi tim ayam
- Course: Main course
- Place of origin: Indonesia
- Region or state: Southeast Asia
- Serving temperature: Hot
- Main ingredients: Rice steamed with chicken or meat

Nasi tim is a Chinese Indonesian steamed chicken rice. In the Indonesian language, nasi means (cooked) rice and tim means steam. The ingredients are chicken, mushroom and hard-boiled egg. These are seasoned in soy sauce and garlic, and then placed at the bottom of a tin bowl. This tin bowl is then filled with rice and steamed until cooked. This dish is usually served with light chicken broth and chopped leeks.

== Variations ==
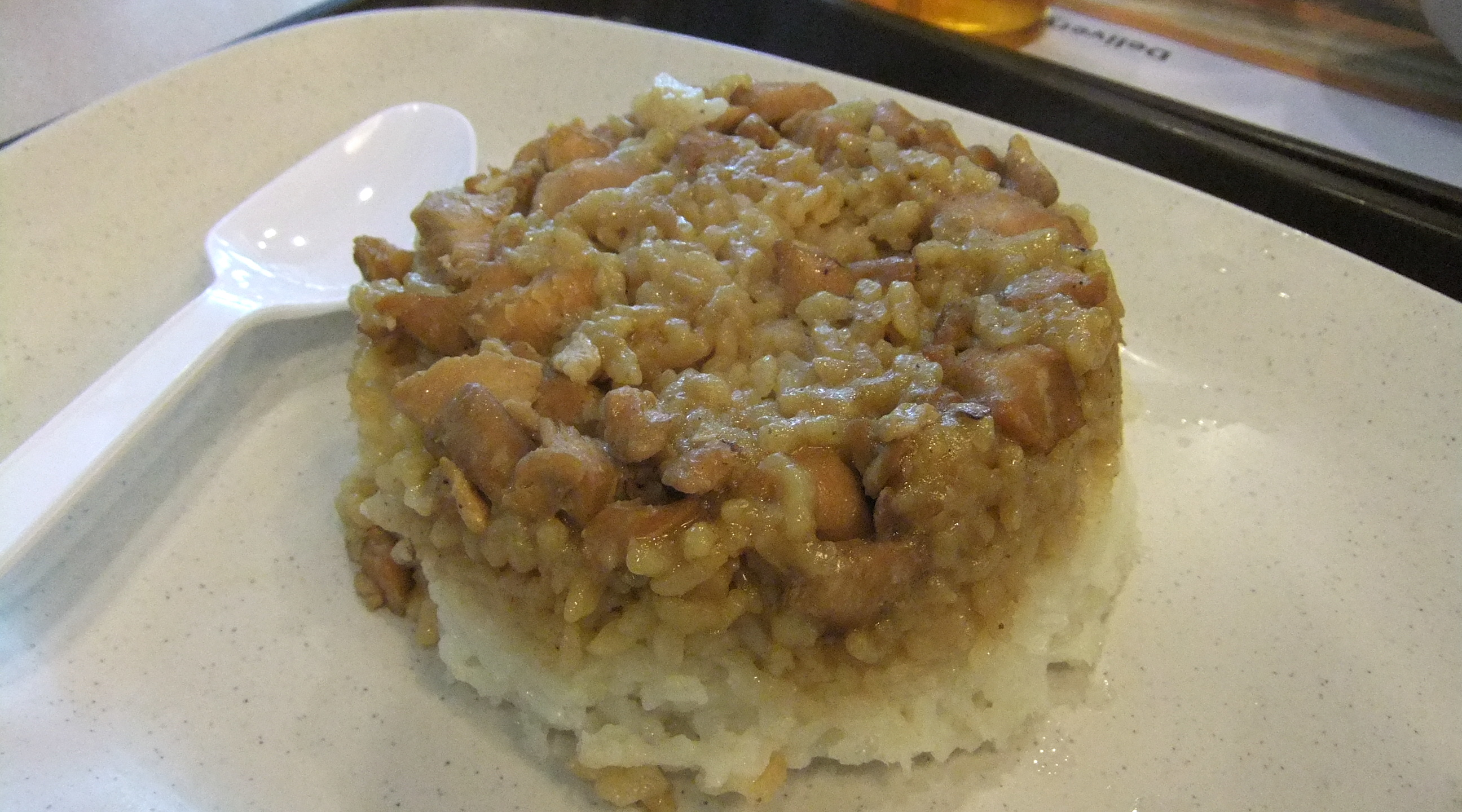
Nasi tim in a Chinese foodstall in Jakarta

Although it commonly uses chicken, some variants also use pork, fish or beef in place of chicken. Nasi tim for babies are often made from red rice and chicken liver.

== Preparation and serving ==
The diced and seasoned boneless chicken and mushroom are stir-fried with garlic and seasoned with soy sauce, Chinese cooking wine, sesame oil and oyster sauce. The rice is seasoned with salt and pepper and garlic. Hard boiled chicken egg is placed in the bottom of the bowl, followed by seasoned cooked chicken and mushroom, then the bowl is filled with seasoned rice. Then the bowl is steamed in a steamer until it is cooked well.

The serving method is as follows: nasi tim in metal bowls (made from tin, aluminium or stainless steel) are usually kept in a steamer to keep warm. It is then served by placing the tin bowl against a plate and the bowl's content will be printed upon the plate. Because this food is always served hot — just like chicken soup — nasi tim is known as comfort food in Chinese Indonesian culture.

The soft texture of rice and boneless chicken also make this dish suitable for young children or adults in convalescence.

== See also ==
- List of chicken dishes
- List of rice dishes
- List of steamed foods
- Hainanese chicken rice
- Duck rice
