= Kwetiau ayam =

Indonesian flat rice noodle dish

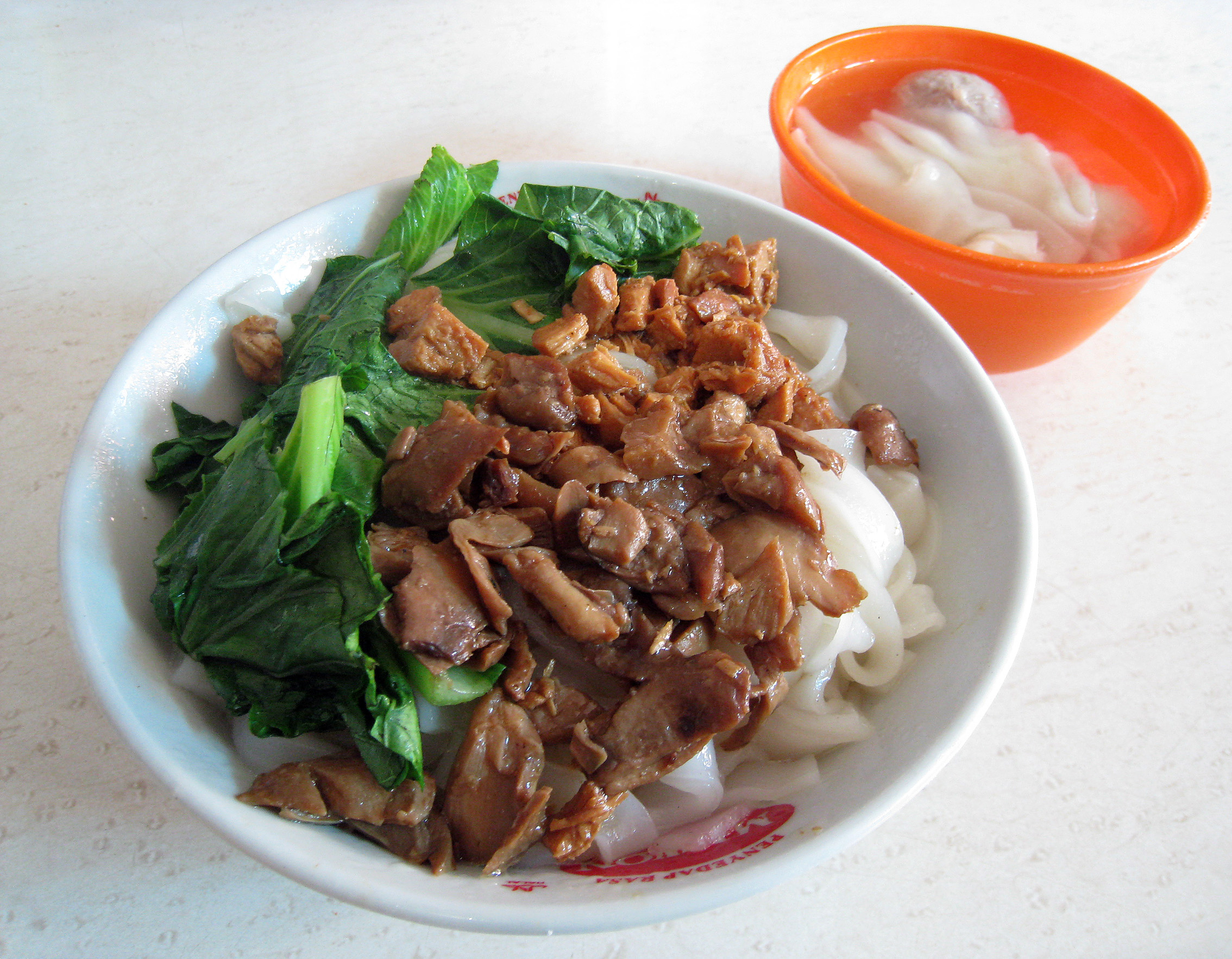
- Kwetiau ayam with mushroom, chinese cabbage and a separate bowl of chicken broth soup with bakso and pangsit (wonton)
- Alternative names: Kwetiau ayam, kuetiau ayam, chicken kway teow
- Course: Main course
- Place of origin: Indonesia
- Region or state: Nationwide in Indonesia, also popular in Southeast Asia
- Associated cuisine: Indonesia
- Serving temperature: Hot
- Main ingredients: Kwetiau, chicken meat, soy sauce, garlic, cooking oil (from chicken fat or vegetable oil), chicken broth, chinese cabbage, scallions

Kwetiau ayam, kuetiau ayam or sometimes kwetiau ayam kuah (Indonesian for 'chicken kway teow') is a common Chinese Indonesian dish of seasoned flat rice noodles topped with diced chicken meat (ayam). It is often described as a kwetiau version of the popular mie ayam (chicken noodles), and especially common in Indonesia, and can trace its origin to Chinese cuisine.

In Indonesia, the dish is recognized as a popular Chinese Indonesian dish together with bakso meatballs and mie ayam, served from simple humble street-side warung to restaurants. Since the recipe is almost identical to the popular mie ayam, food stalls and restaurants that serve mie ayam usually also offer kwetiau ayam and bihun ayam.

== Preparation and serving ==
The kwetiau flat rice noodles are boiled in water until the texture becomes al dente and mixed in a bowl with cooking oil, soy sauce and garlic. The oil coats the noodle to separate the threads. The oil can be chicken fat, lard, or vegetable oil. The chicken meat is diced and cooked in soy sauce and other seasonings, including garlic. The chicken meat might also be cooked with jamur (mushrooms).

The soy sauce seasoned chicken and mushroom mixture is placed on the flat rice noodles, and topped with chopped spring onions (green shallots). Kwetiau ayam is usually served with a separate chicken broth, boiled chinese cabbage, and often wonton (Indonesian: pangsit) either dry, crispy fried or moist soft in soup, and also bakso (meatballs). While Chinese variants might use pork fat or lard, the more common Indonesian kwetiau ayam uses halal chicken fat or vegetable oil to cater to Muslim customers.

Additional condiments might include tong cay (salted preserved vegetables), bawang goreng (fried shallots), daun bawang (leek), pangsit goreng (fried wonton), acar timun cabe rawit (pickled cucumber and birds eye chilli), sambal chili sauce and tomato ketchup.

== Variants ==
The dish recipe is actually almost identical to the popular mie ayam that uses yellow wheat noodles instead. Thus, variants might use almost an exact recipe and ingredients while replacing the type of noodles; either common mi wheat noodles or bihun (rice vermicelli).

Although kwetiau ayam is sometimes also called kwetiau ayam kuah or kwetiau kuah (soupy kway teow), the recipe is actually rather different. Kwetiau ayam chicken broth soup is usually served in a separate bowl, while kwetiau kuah noodle is cooked and served in rich soup together in a single bowl, more akin to mie kuah.

== See also ==
- Mie goreng
- Kwetiau goreng
- Kwetiau sapi
- Char kway teow
- List of noodle dishes
- List of chicken dishes
