= Sapo tahu =

Indonesian tofu soup dish

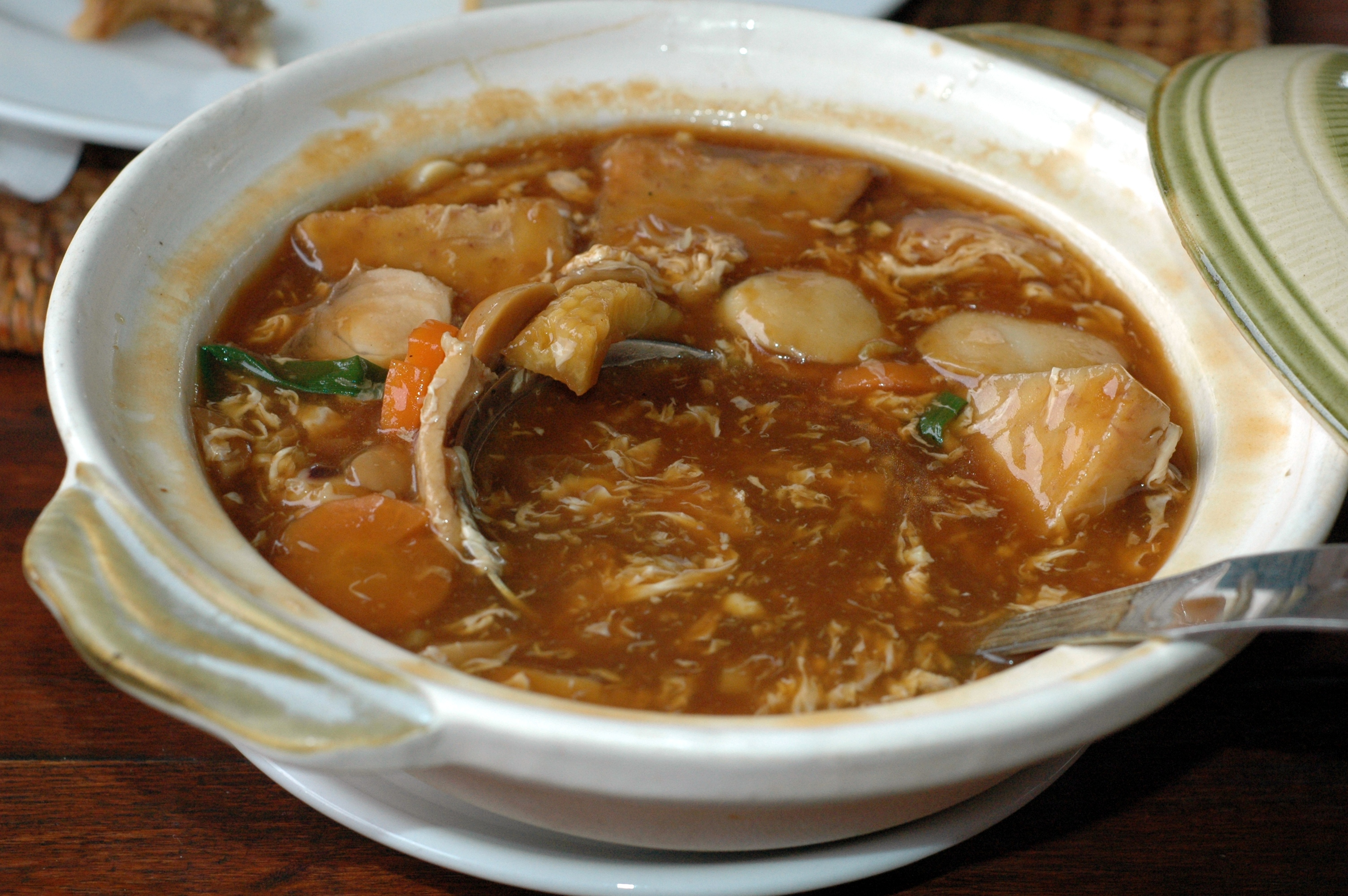
- Sapo tahu served in claypot tung
- Course: Main course
- Place of origin: Indonesia
- Region or state: Java
- Serving temperature: Hot
- Main ingredients: Stir-fried tofu, vegetables, chicken or seafood

Sapo tahu (Chinese: 砂鍋豆腐; pinyin: shāguō dòufu; lit. 'claypot tofu') is a Chinese Indonesian tofu dish traditionally cooked and served in claypot. Sapo tahu may be served as a vegetarian dish, or with chicken, seafood (especially shrimp), minced beef or pork. It is a popular tofu dish in Indonesia, with several Chinese restaurants competing to serve the best-tasting sapo tahu in Jakarta.

== Ingredients ==
Its main ingredient is soft and smooth silken or egg tofu, cooked in claypot with vegetables including carrots, mushrooms, mustard greens, leeks, Chinese cabbage, common beans, cauliflower, broccoli, baby corn, garlic and onion, seasoned with soy sauce, oyster sauce, fish sauce, salt and pepper. Sapo tahu usually also contains chicken or seafood, including shrimp, squid and fish.

== Cooking method and utensils ==
Traditionally, sapo tahu are strictly cooked in a traditional Chinese claypot on a charcoal fire. However, today it might be cooked in a common metal wok, cauldron or saucepan instead.

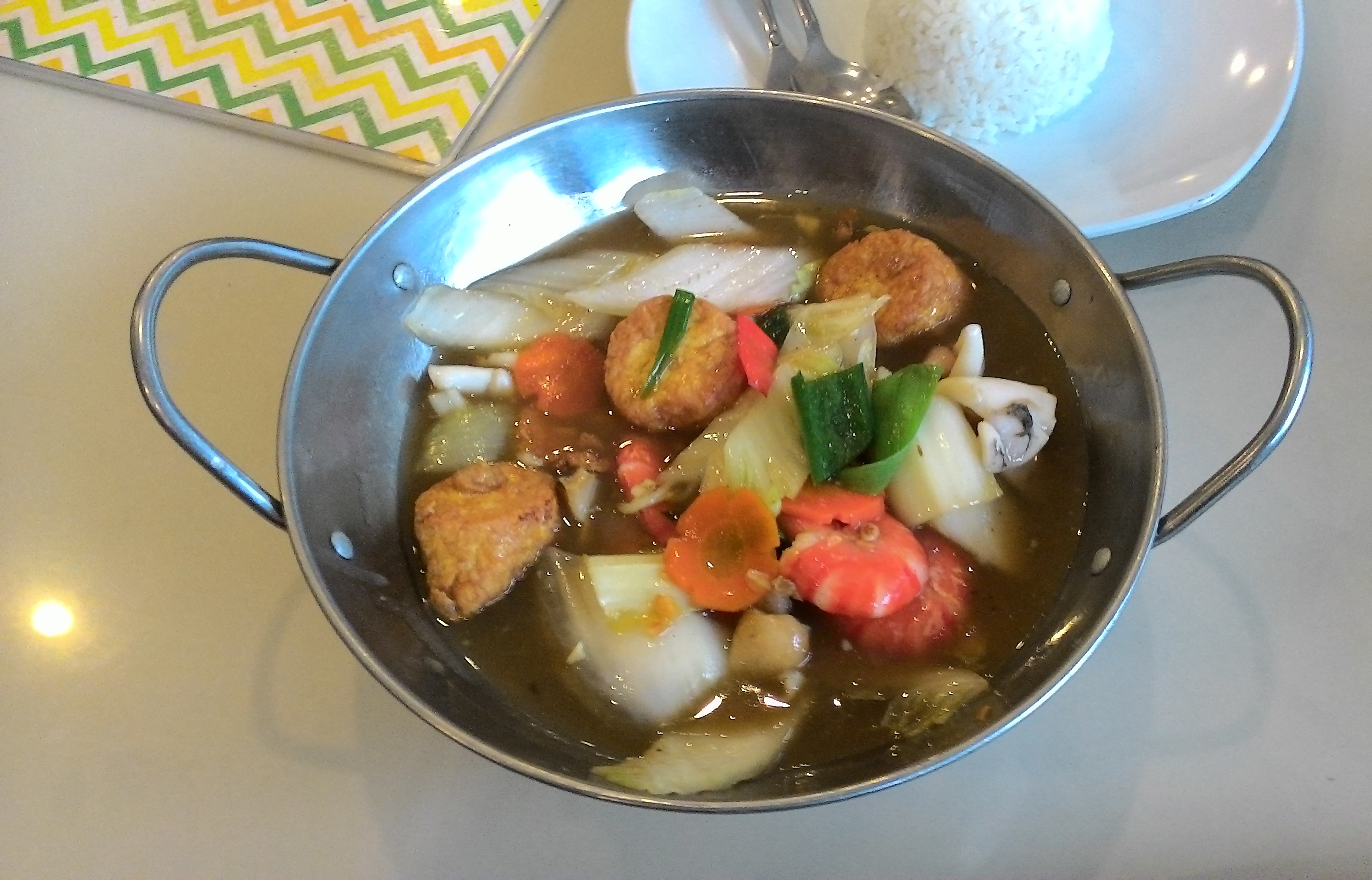
Sapo tahu seafood

== See also ==
- Claypot chicken rice
- Mun tahu
- List of tofu dishes
- Cap cai
- Tahu goreng
