= Kwetiau goreng =

Indonesian flat rice noodle dish

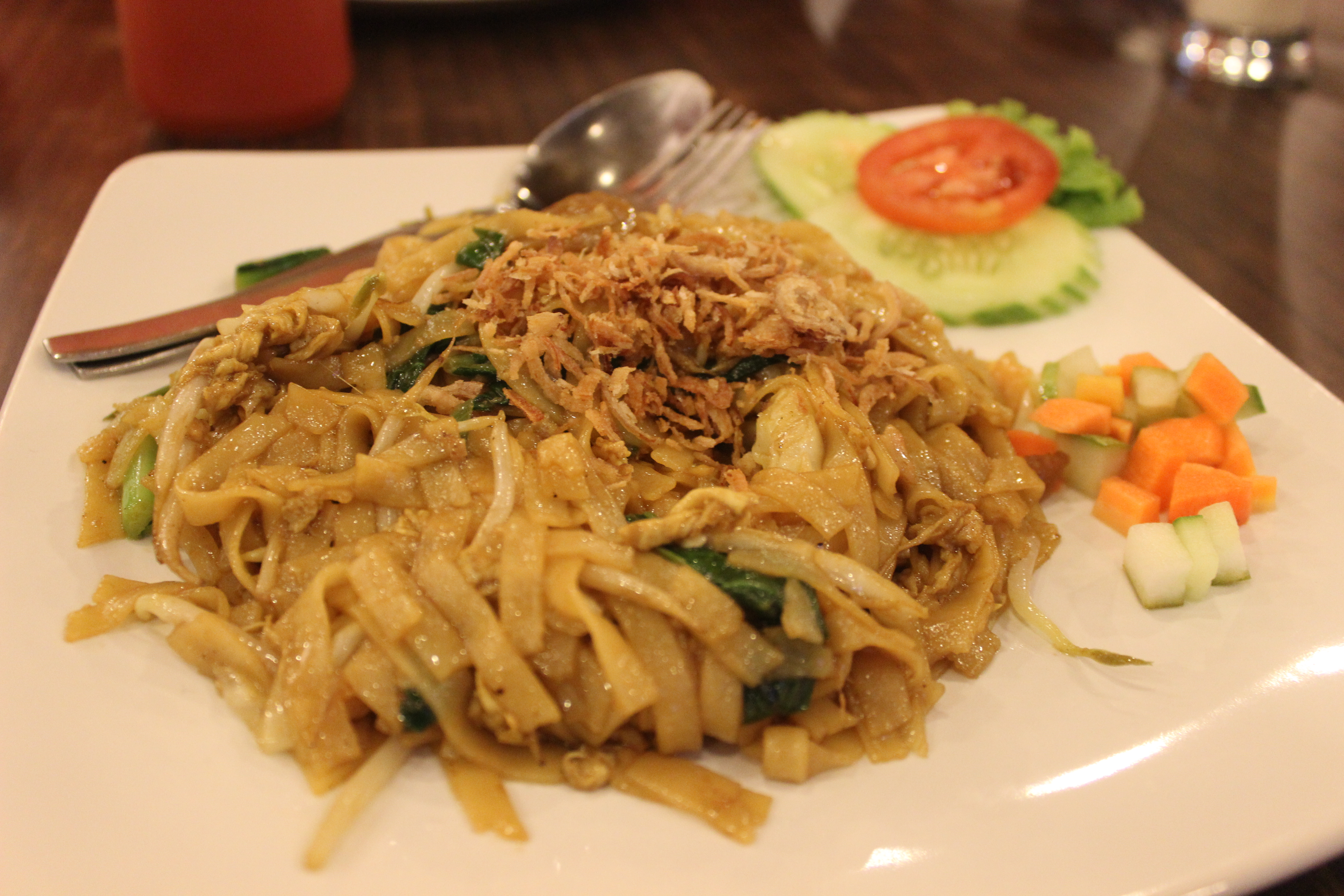
- Kwetiau goreng in a restaurant in Indonesia served with acar pickles and fried shallot sprinkles
- Alternative names: Kwetiaw goreng
- Course: Main course
- Place of origin: Indonesia,Malaysia
- Region or state: Nationwide
- Serving temperature: Hot
- Main ingredients: Fried flat noodles with chicken, meat, beef, prawn or crab

Kwetiau goreng (lit. 'fried kway teow') is an Indonesian style of stir-fried flat rice noodle dish. It is made from noodles, locally known as kwetiau, which are stir-fried in cooking oil with garlic, onion or shallots, beef, chicken, fried prawn, crab or sliced bakso (meatballs), chili, Chinese cabbage, cabbages, tomatoes, egg, and other vegetables with an ample amount of kecap manis (sweet soy sauce). In Asia, kwetiau is available in two forms, dried and fresh. Its recipe is quite similar to another Chinese Indonesian dish, mie goreng (fried noodles), except for the use of flat rice noodles in kwetiau goreng.

Ubiquitous in Indonesia, kwetiau is sold by many food vendors, from traveling street hawkers in their carts (warungs) to high-end restaurants. It is a favourite one-dish meal amongst Indonesians, although street food hawkers commonly sell it together with mie goreng and nasi goreng (fried rice). Kwetiau goreng is also served in Indonesian franchise restaurants.

Indonesian kwetiau goreng usually tastes mildly sweet with a generous addition of sweet soy sauce, spicier with the addition of sambal as a condiment, and mostly uses halal chicken and beef instead of pork and lard to cater to the Muslim majority population. The most common protein sources for kwetiau goreng are beef, chicken, prawns, or crab.

== Origin ==
Chinese influence is evident in Indonesian food, such as bakmi, mie ayam, pangsit, mie goreng and kwetiau goreng. The dish is derived from Chinese stir-fried shahe fen (Chinese: 沙河粉) and believed to have been introduced by Chinese immigrants in Indonesia over several centuries. In fact, term kwetiau originates from the Hokkien designation for the dish, kóe-tiâu (Chinese: 粿条). The Chinese first made contact with Indonesia in the 7th century, and by the 1600s Chinese settlements had sprung up along the coasts of Java and Sumatra. Centuries of interactions between the two cultures resulted in the blending of Chinese and local cuisine. Kwetiau goreng may be served with sweet soy sauce that adds mild sweetness, or a sprinkle of bawang goreng fried shallots, or sambal to add spiciness. Kwetiau goreng may have a krupuk topping to add a crispy texture, and not contain pork or lard to cater for Muslims.

== Variations ==
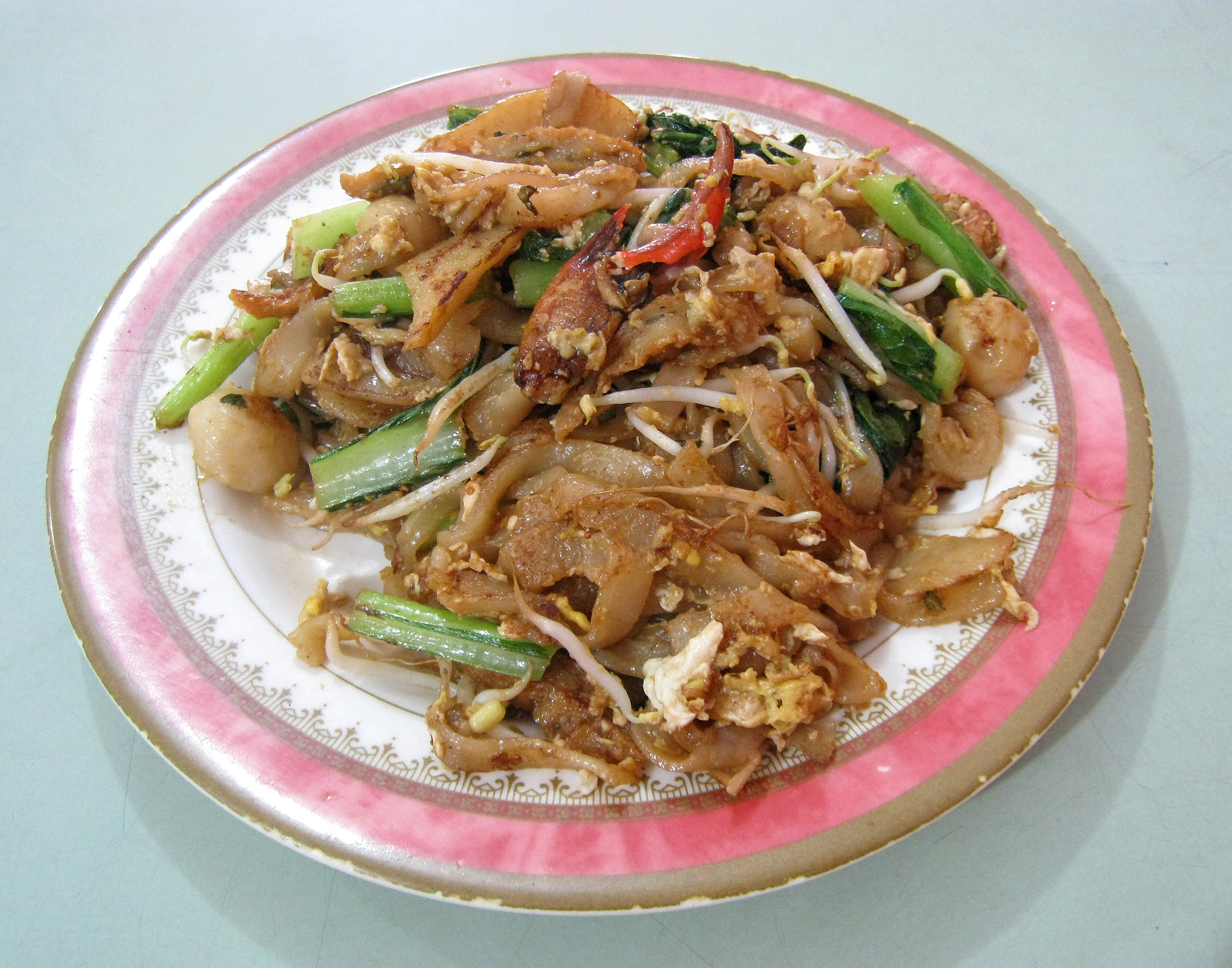
Kwetiau goreng kepiting, crab fried kwetiau.

Just like mie goreng, kwetiau goreng recipes might vary according to its ingredients. The popular variants are kwetiau goreng sapi (beef), kwetiau goreng ayam (chicken), kwetiau goreng seafood (including cuttlefish, prawn and fish) and kwetiau goreng kepiting (crab). The kwetiau goreng pedas (hot and spicy) uses a lot of chili pepper, while kwetiau goreng sayuran mainly uses vegetables.

Another popular kwetiau recipe is called kwetiau kuah (kwetiau with soup), kwetiau ayam (chicken kwetiau with soup) and kwetiau siram (poured kwetiau), in which the flat rice noodles are boiled or poured with thick soup or sauce instead of being stir-fried. Another variant called kwetiau bun is similar to kwetiau goreng but moister and softer with the addition of more water.

There is a variation called kwetiau goreng lenjer, which is made by slicing the pempek and mixing it with chicken, prawns, eggs, bean sprouts and soy sauce.

== See also ==
- Kwetiau ayam
- Kwetiau sapi
- Mie ayam
- Pad see ew
- List of noodle dishes
- Rice noodles
