= Beef kway teow =

Southeast Asian flat rice noodle dish

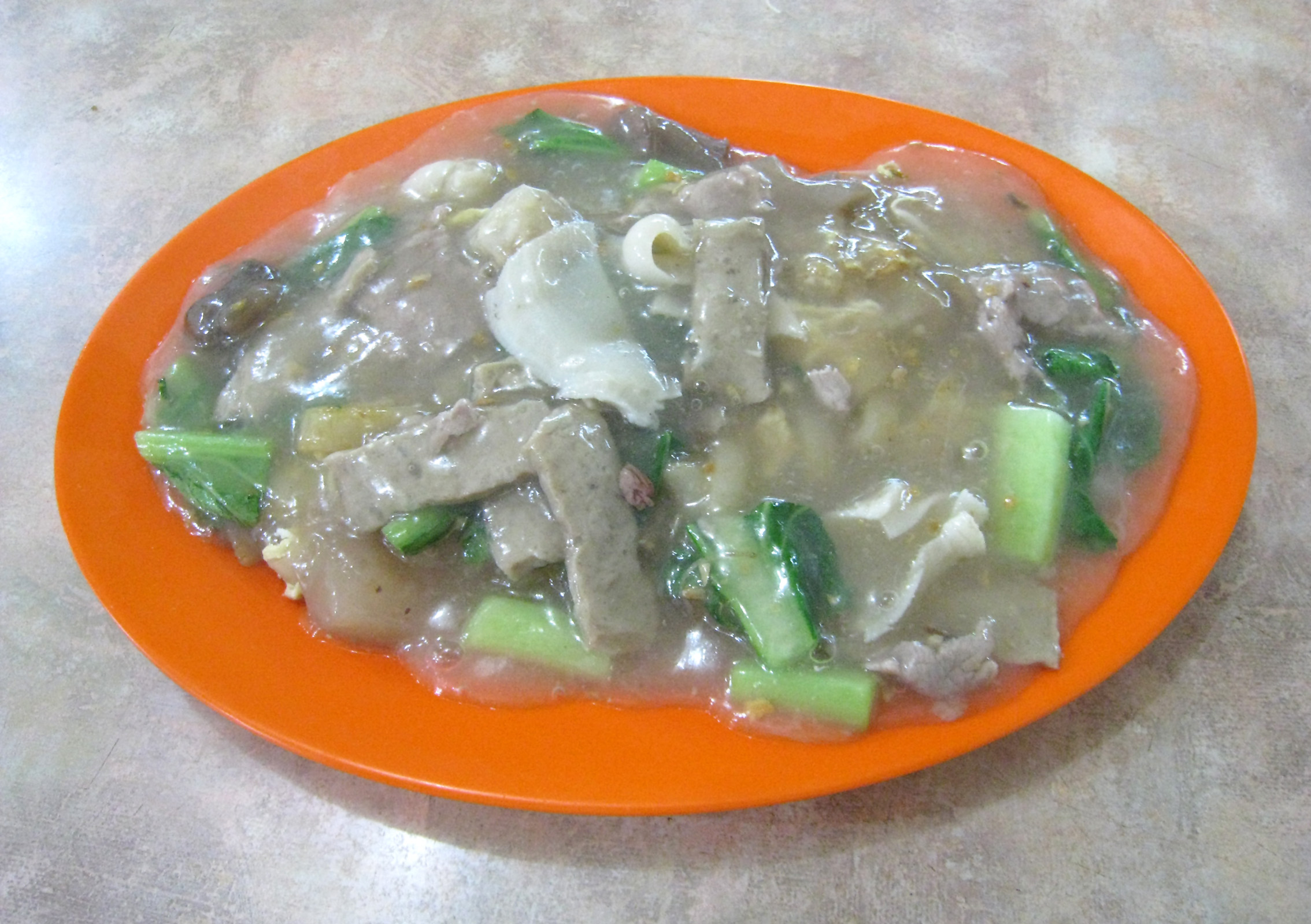
- Kwetiau siram sapi, poured beef kway teow served in Jakarta
- Alternative names: Kwetiau Sapi
- Course: Main course
- Region or state: Maritime Southeast Asia
- Associated cuisine: Indonesia and Singapore
- Serving temperature: Hot
- Main ingredients: Kway teow (flat rice noodles), beef tenderloin, gula Melaka, sliced, dried black beans, garlic, dark soy sauce, lengkuas (galangal or blue ginger), oyster sauce, soya sauce, chilli and sesame oil
- Variations: Fried beef kway teow, Hainanese-style beef noodles

Beef kway teow or beef kwetiau is a Maritime Southeast Asian dish of flat rice noodles (kway teow) stir-fried and topped with slices of beef or sometimes beef offal, served either dry or with soup. The dish is commonly found in Southeast Asian countries, especially Singapore and Indonesia, and can trace its origin to Chinese tradition. It is a popular dish in Singaporean cuisine and among Chinese Indonesians, where it locally known in Indonesian as kwetiau sapi.

== Variants ==
Technically, all kway teow (flat rice noodles) stir fried with beef can be categorized as beef kway teow. As the result, there are various recipes of beef kway teow exist.

=== Singapore ===
In Singapore, traditionally, beef extract was added to the stock, and the soup enhanced with gula melaka and lengkuas (galangal or blue ginger). However, the dry version of beef kway teow is mixed with sesame oil, soy sauce and chilli; thick gravy is not usually served in this version.

=== Indonesia ===
In Indonesia, kwetiau sapi is a popular Chinese Indonesian dish. Kwetiau with beef is known in three variants; kwetiau siram sapi (poured upon), kwetiau goreng sapi (stir fried), kwetiau bun sapi (a rather moist version), kwetiau yam sapi (dry and sour with soup on the side) and kwetiau kuah sapi (soup version). The kwetiau siram sapi is a kwetiau noodle poured (Indonesian: siram) with beef in thick flavorful sauce. The beef sauce has thick and rather gloppy glue-like consistency acquired from corn starch as thickening agent. The kwetiau goreng sapi is a variant of popular kwetiau goreng (stir fried kway teow) but distinctly served with beef. While the kwetiau bun sapi is similar to common fried kwetiau but rather moist and soft due to water addition. The kwetiau yam sapi is a dry version with black vinegar and served with soup on the side.

The common ingredients are flat rice noodles (kwetiau), thin slices of beef tenderloin, garlic, sliced bakso meatballs, caisim, napa cabbage, oyster sauce, beef stock, soy sauce, black pepper, sugar, corn starch, and cooking oil.

== See also ==
- Kwetiau goreng
- Char kway teow
- Beef chow fun
- Chinese Indonesian cuisine
- Rice noodles
