= Duck rice =

Southeast Asian duck dish

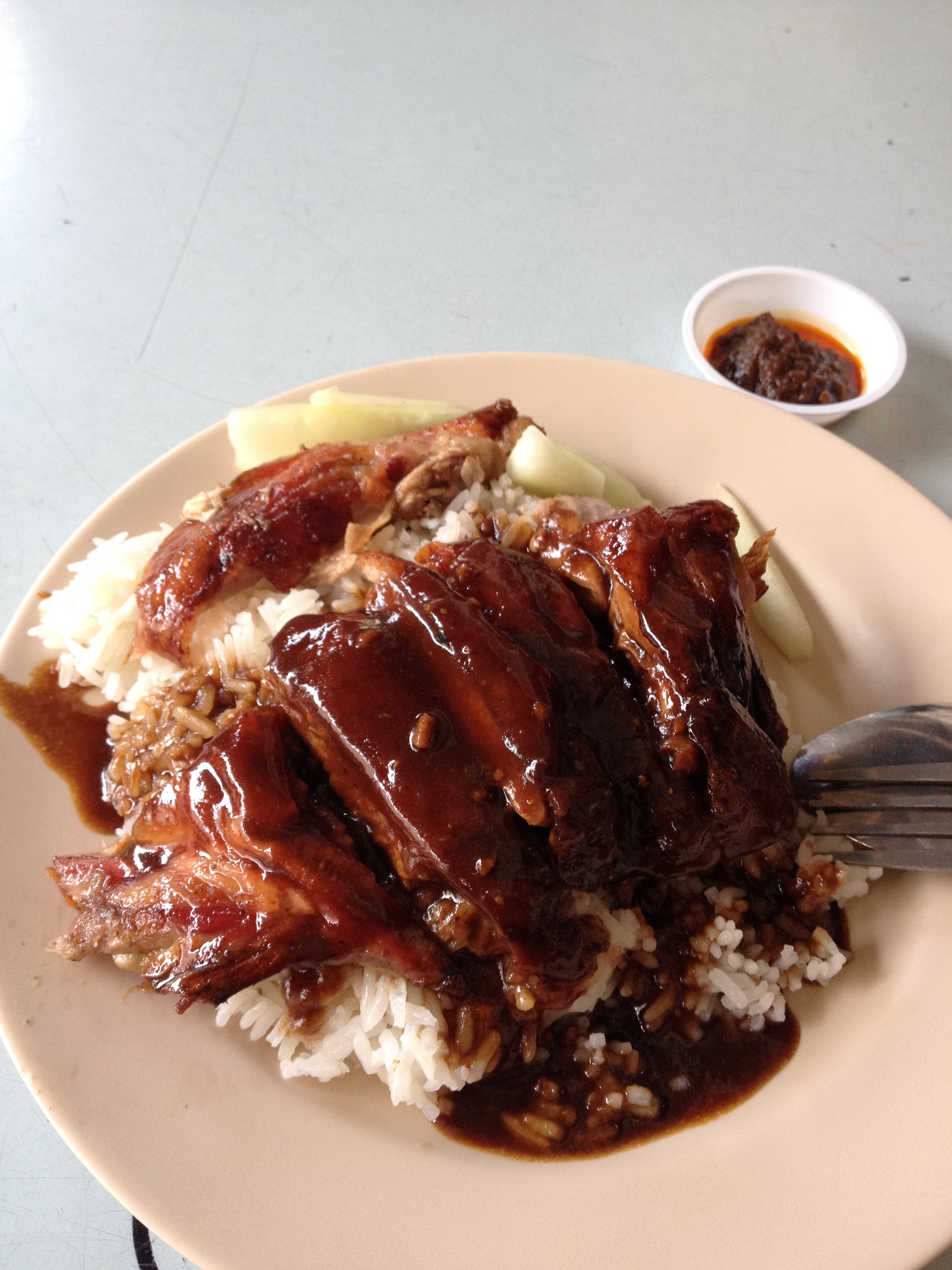
- Roast duck rice served at a kopi tiam in Singapore
- Place of origin: Southeast Asia
- Region or state: Greater China, Mainland Southeast Asia, Maritime Southeast Asia
- Associated cuisine: Brunei, Indonesia, Malaysia, Singapore, and Thailand
- Main ingredients: Duck, maltose or honey, rice vinegar, rice

Duck rice (simplified Chinese: 鸭饭; traditional Chinese: 鴨飯; pinyin: yā fàn; Jyutping: aap3 faan6; Pe̍h-ōe-jī: ah-pn̄g) is a Southeast Asian meat dish usually consumed by the Chinese diaspora in Maritime Southeast Asia, made of either braised or roasted duck and plain white rice. The braised duck is usually cooked with yam and shrimp. It can be served simply with plain white rice and a thick dark sauce; side dishes such as braised hard-boiled eggs, preserved salted vegetables or hard beancurd may be added. Teochew boneless duck rice is a similar, but more refined dish; due to the slightly tougher texture of duck, the duck is artfully deboned and sliced thinly for the convenience of the diner, allowing the sauces to seep into the meat. Hainanese chicken rice and other similar dishes are frequently served in this style due to its popularity.

This dish can commonly be found in Singapore food centers.

In Thailand, this dish is called khao na pet (ข้าวหน้าเป็ด; lit: "rice topped with duck"), and is sold by street vendors or in restaurants inside shopping malls. A Bangkok neighborhood known for its duck rice is Bangrak on Charoen Krung road. In addition, it has also been adapted to other dishes by mixing roasted red pork and Chinese sausage with a special gravy, a dish called khao che po (ข้าวเฉโป) or khao sia po (ข้าวเสียโป), meaning "gamble away rice". It is considered traditional Teochew cuisine.

== See also ==
- Siu mei are Cantonese roast meats, often sold together with plain rice
- List of duck dishes
- List of rice dishes
