= Cap cai =

Indonesian stir-fried mixed vegetables

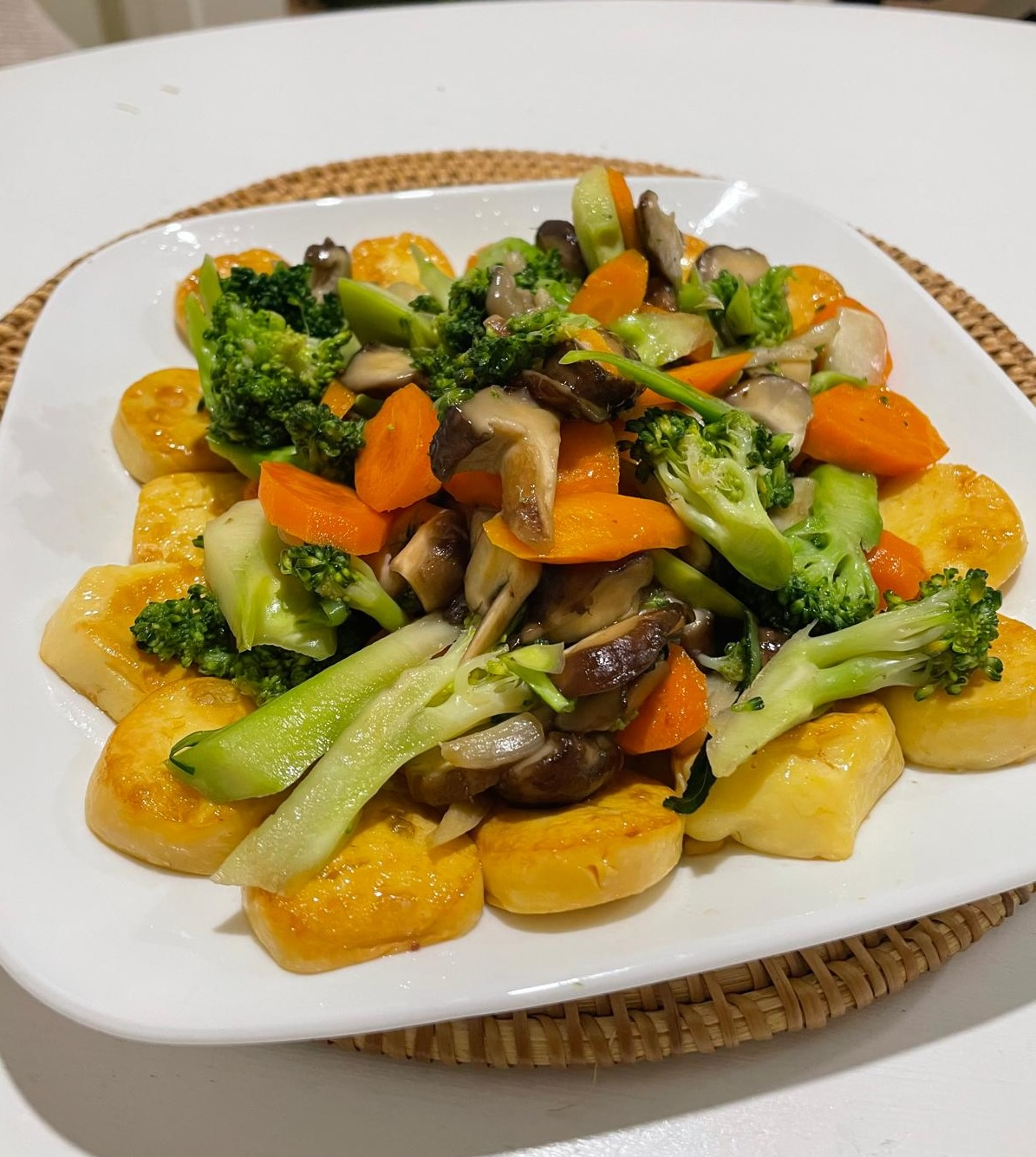
- Cap cai
- Course: Main course
- Place of origin: China
- Region or state: Nationwide in Indonesia, also popular in Southeast Asia
- Serving temperature: Hot
- Main ingredients: Stir-fried mixed vegetables with broccoli, carrot and mushrooms
- Variations: Cap cai kuah (soupy) and Cap cai goreng (dry)

Cap cai, sometimes spelled cap cay (Chinese: 雜菜; pinyin: zácài; Pe̍h-ōe-jī: cha̍p-chhài; lit. 'mixed vegetables'), is the Hokkien-derived term for a popular Chinese Indonesian and Peranakan stir fried vegetable dish that originates from Fujian cuisine.

== History ==
According to Aji Bromokusumo, an expert on Chinese Peranakan cuisine in Indonesia, the stir fried mixed vegetables has its origin from the Chinese imperial kitchen. According to the royal etiquette, the Chinese emperor should always consume high quality food made of fresh ingredients daily, thus there are a lot of leftover vegetables in the palace kitchen. This led the chef to salvage the leftover vegetables, mixed and stir-fried it as a new dish, which led to the creation of Chinese stir-fried mixed vegetables. This stir-fried leftover vegetables of course, was not meant for the emperor or the royal family, but is served to feed the palace servants, eunuch and courtiers.

Cap cai was brought to Indonesia from the Fujian area, where the Hokkien people originated. Subsequently, the Hokkien people are the dominant Chinese ethnic group in Indonesia. According to a culinary history expert, Chinese immigrants who arrived in Indonesia cooked cap cai because Indonesia is rich in various types of vegetables. On the other hand, meat was not affordable for the struggling early immigrants. This is also the reason why cap cai does not have a rigid recipe regarding the types of vegetables contained in it.

== Ingredients ==
Various vegetables such as cauliflower, cabbage, Chinese cabbage, Napa cabbage, carrot, baby corn, mushrooms, and leeks are chopped and stir-fried in a wok with small amount of cooking oil and water. Chopped garlic and onion with salt, sugar, soy sauce, ang ciu Chinese cooking wine and oyster sauce are added for flavour. The liquid sauces are thickened using corn starch.

Cap cai can be made as a vegetarian dish, or mixed with meats such as chicken, liver or gizzard, beef, fish, shrimp or cuttlefish, and slices of beef or fish bakso (meatballs). The type and numbers of vegetables differ according to recipe variations and the availability of vegetables in each household, but the most common vegetables in simple cap cai are cauliflower, cabbage and carrot.

== See also ==
- Chop suey
- Japchae
- Peranakan cuisine
