= List of noodle dishes =

Images and descriptions of noodle dishes from cuisines around the world

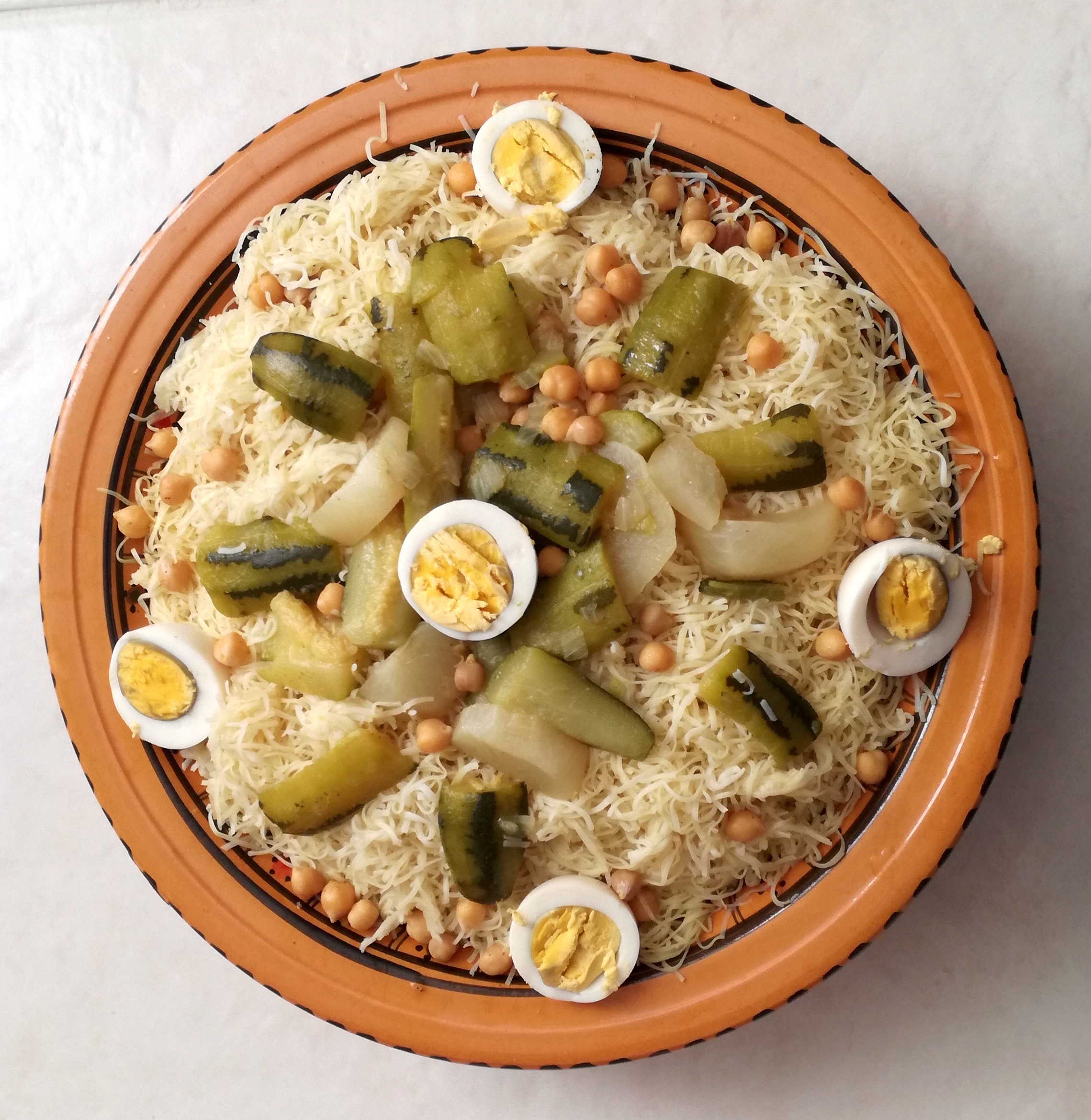
A bowl of rechta in broth

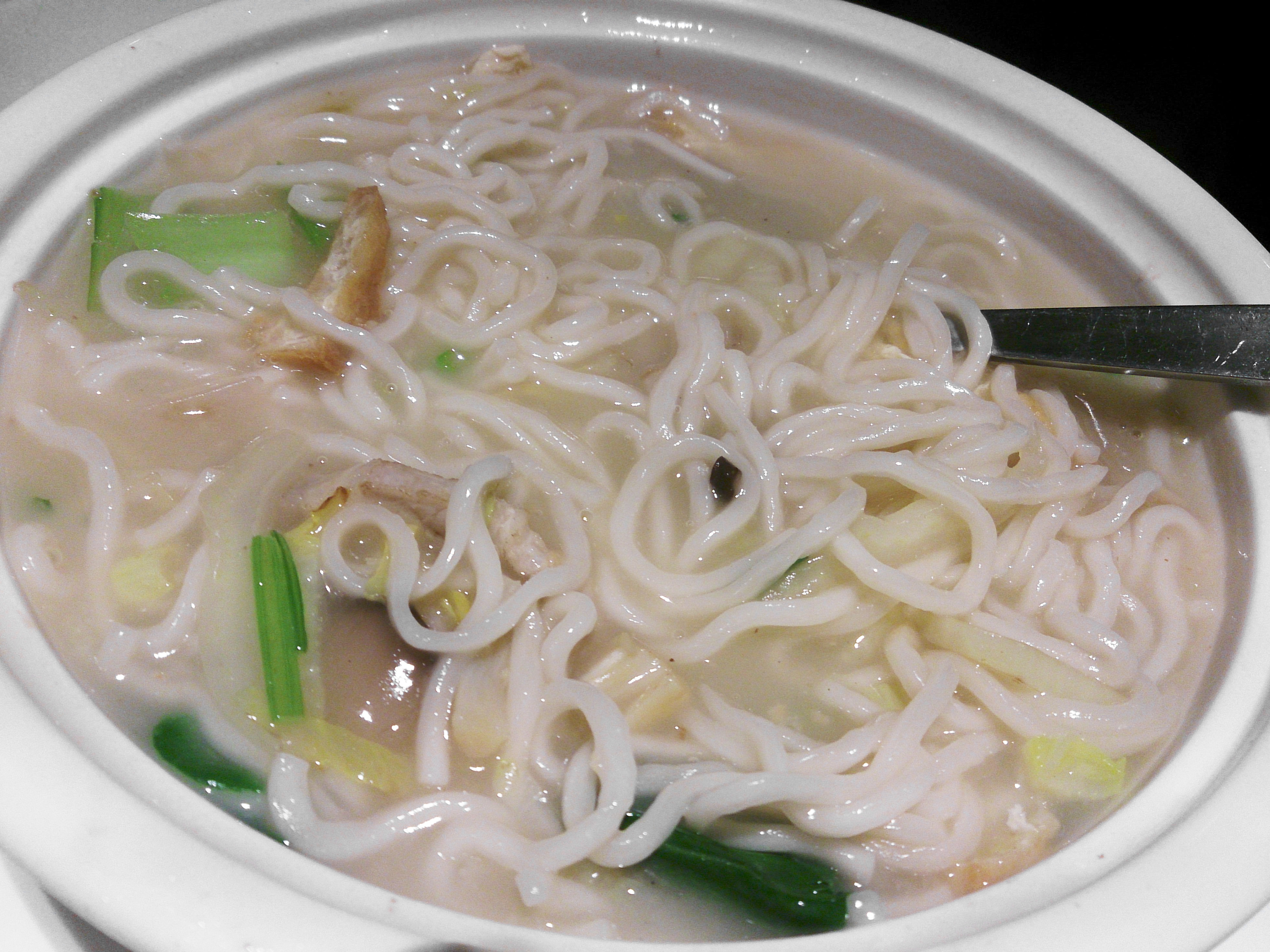
Noodles are used in a variety of dishes.

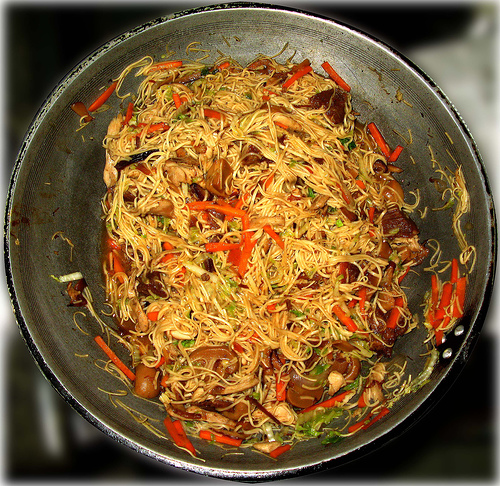
Fried misua noodles

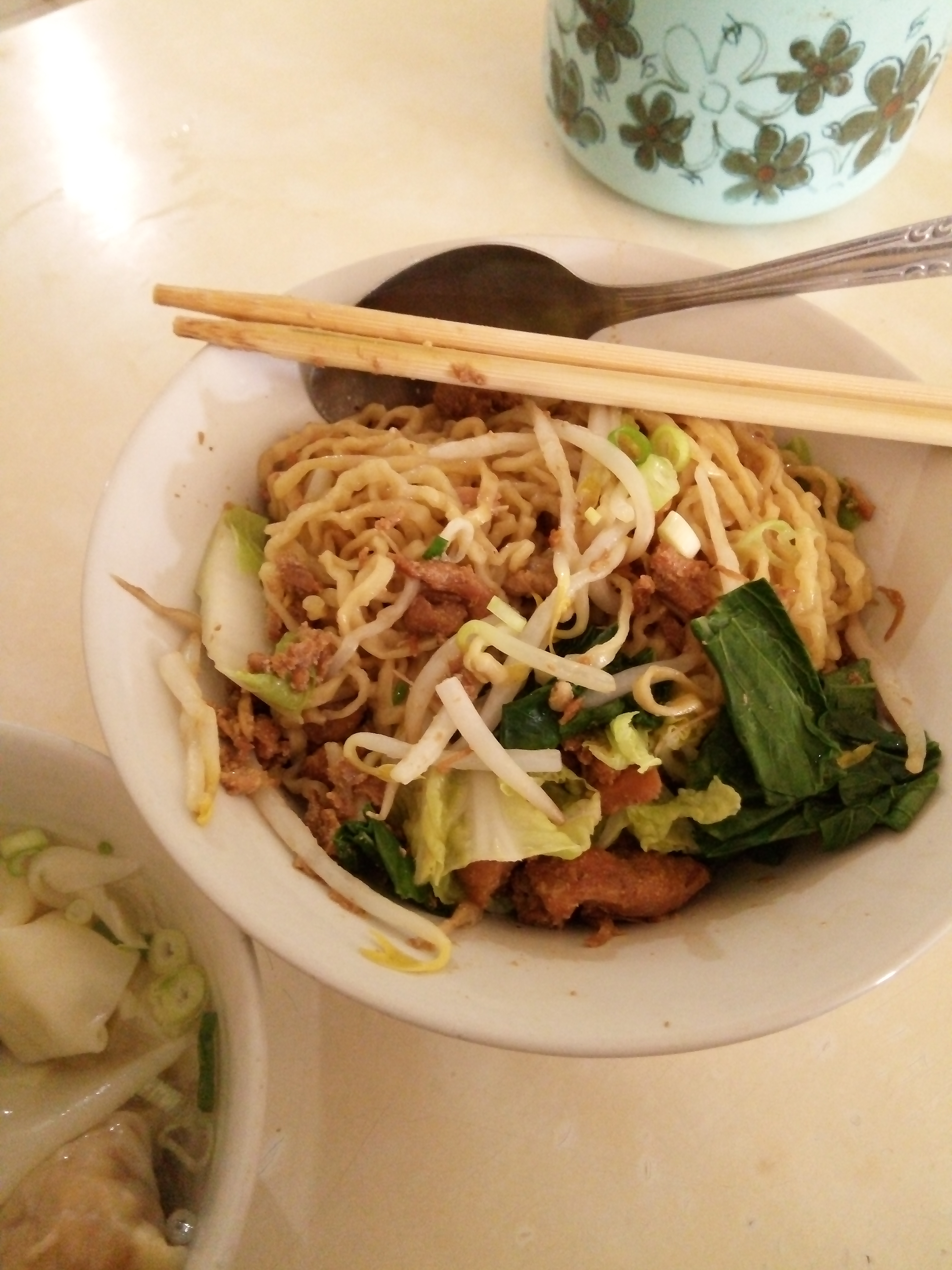
Mie ayam, an Indonesian noodle dish

This is a list of notable noodle dishes. Noodles are a type of staple food made from some type of unleavened dough which is rolled flat and cut into one of a variety of shapes. While long, thin strips may be the most common, many varieties of noodles are cut into waves, helices, tubes, strings, or shells, or folded over, or cut into other shapes. Noodles are usually cooked in boiling water, sometimes with cooking oil or salt added. They are often pan-fried or deep-fried. Noodles are often served with an accompanying sauce or in a soup.

== General ==
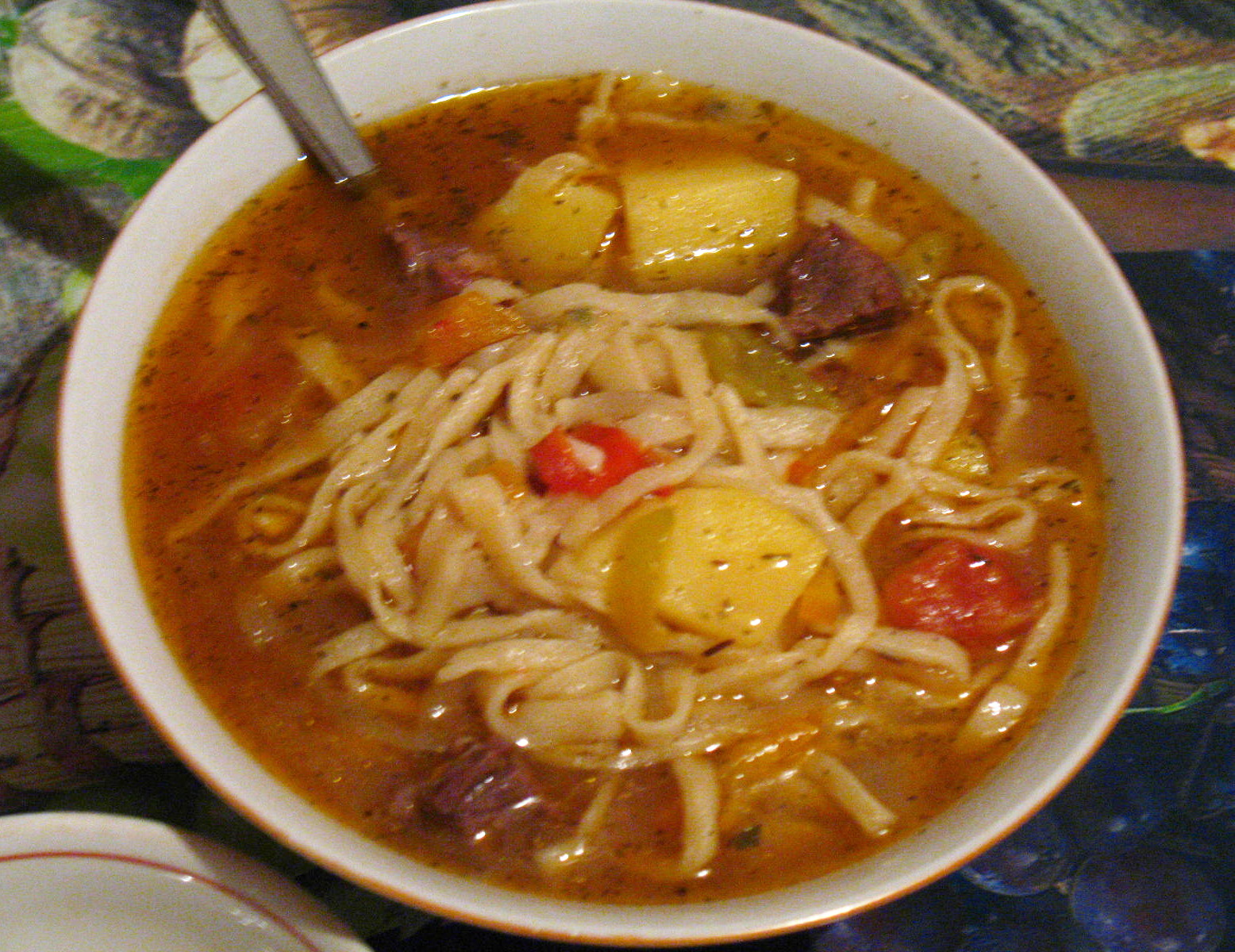
A bowl of kesme in broth

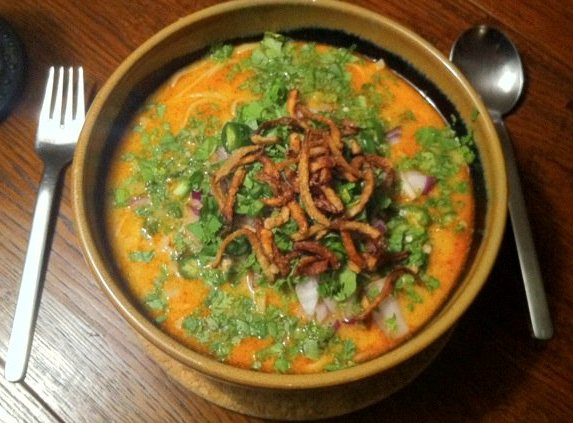
Khow suey

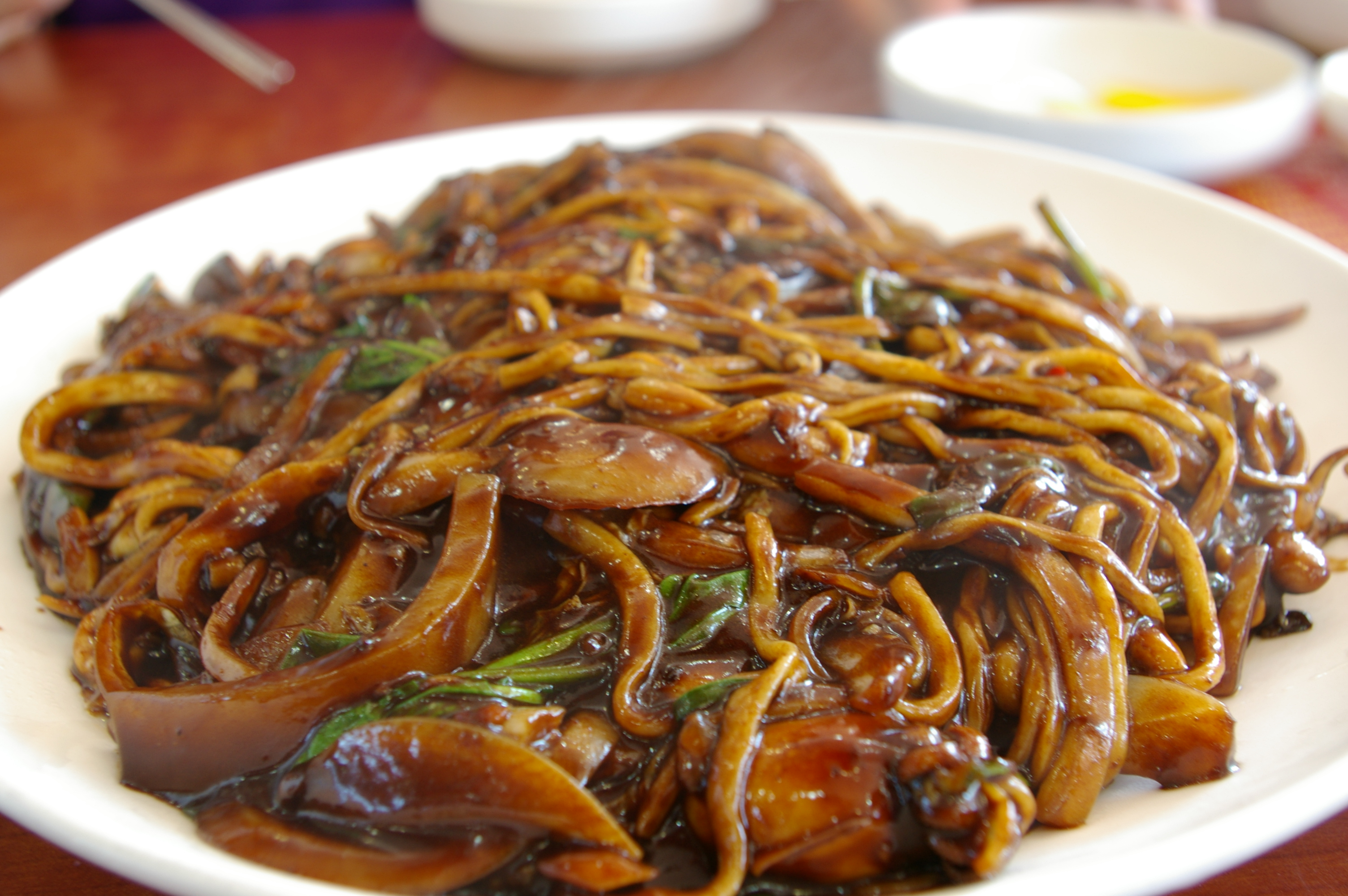
Jajangmyeon

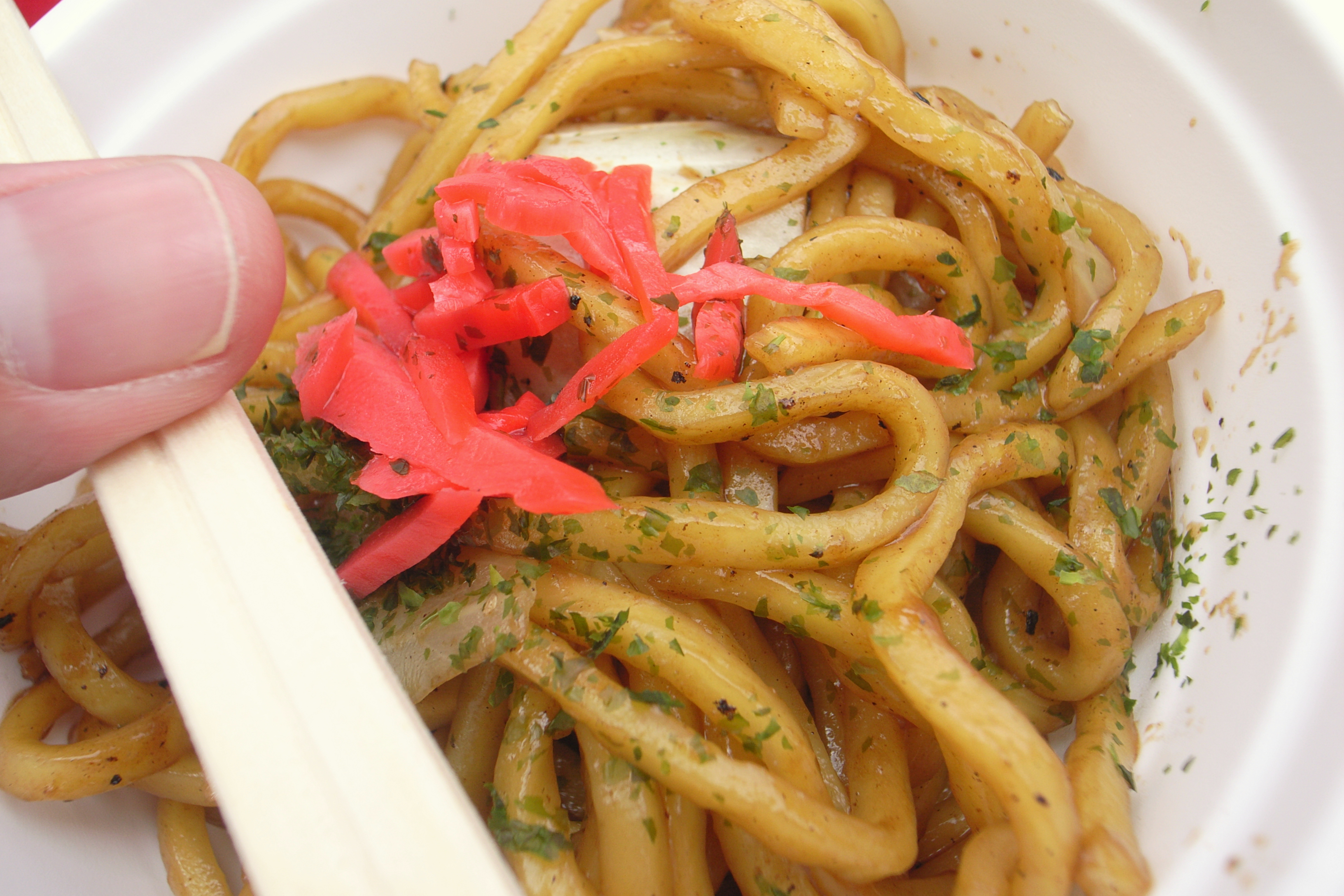
Yakisoba

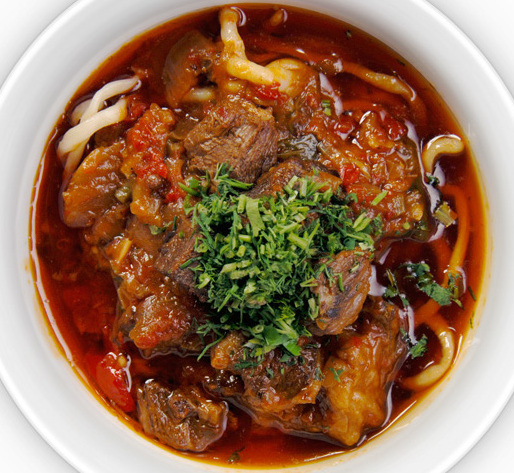
Uzbek lag'mon in Tashkent

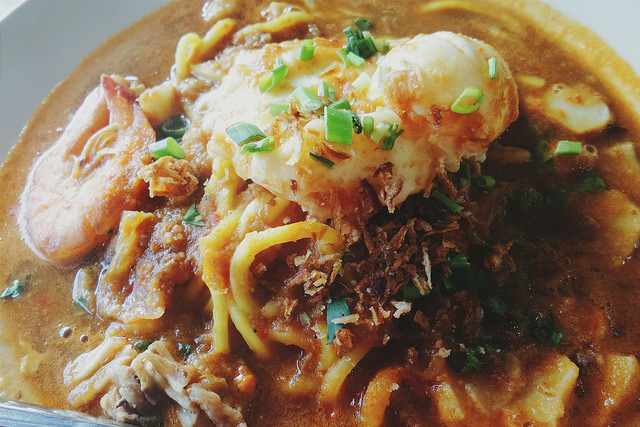
Mee bandung Muar

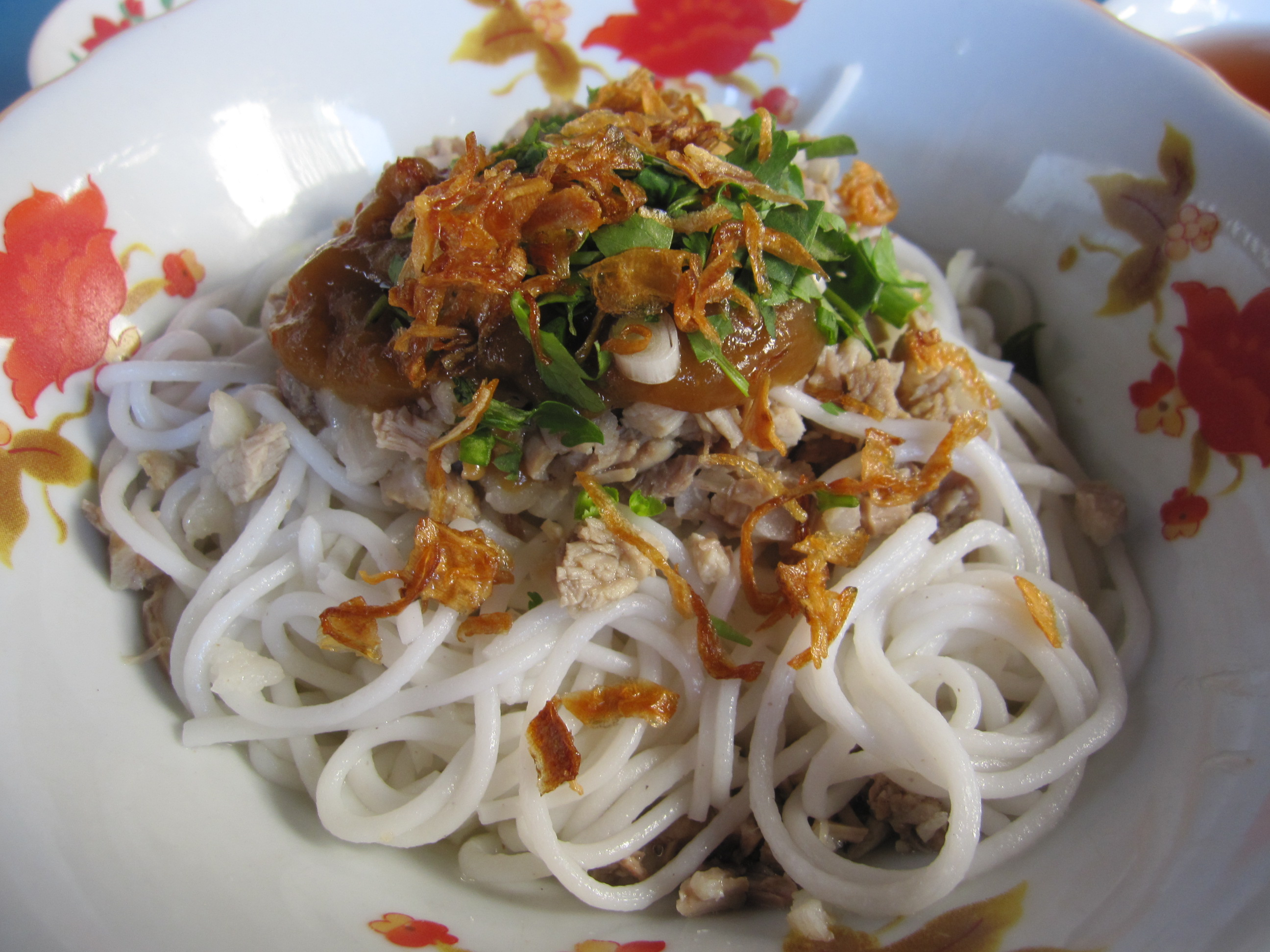
Mogok meeshay

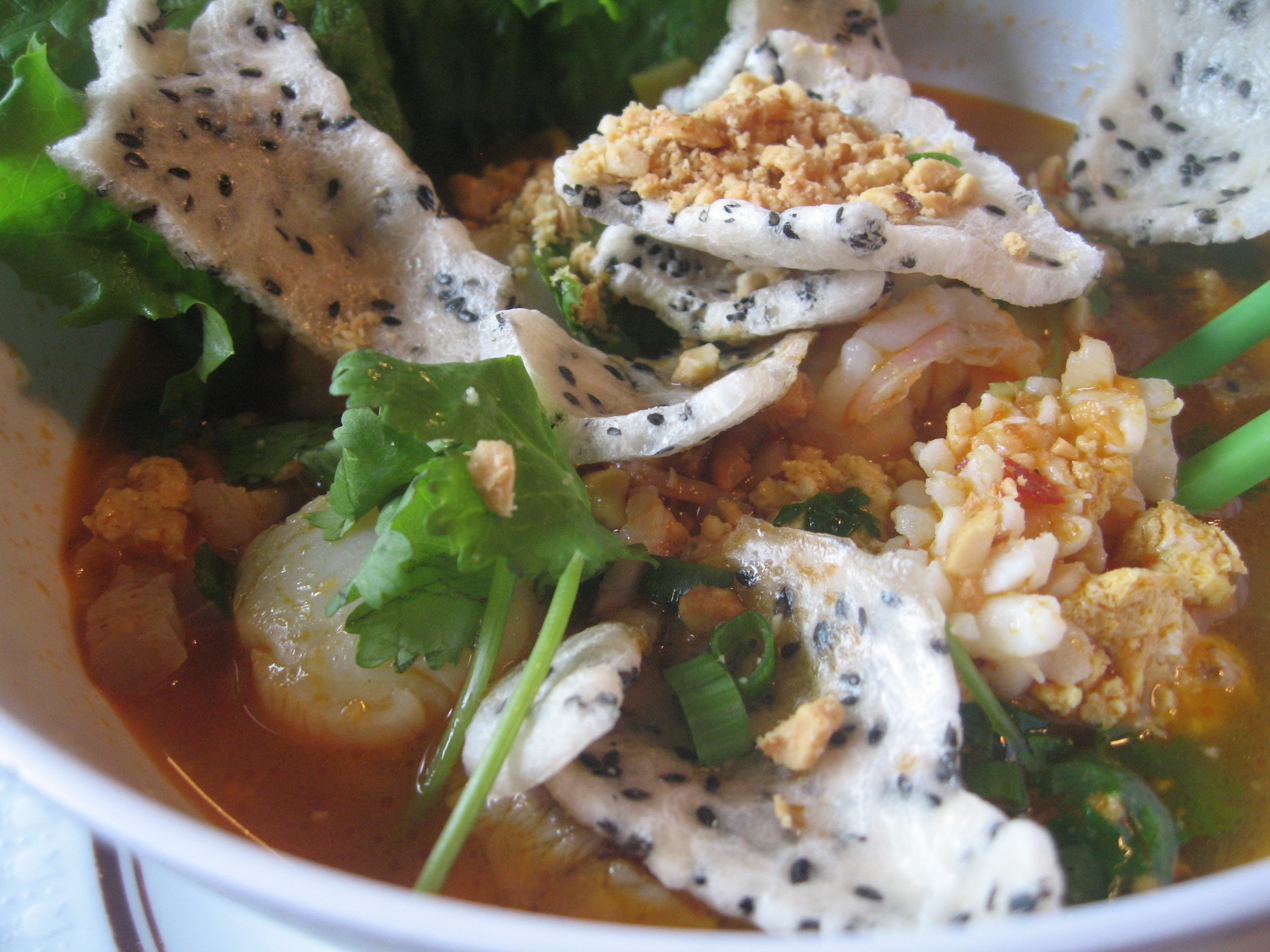
A bowl of mì Quảng

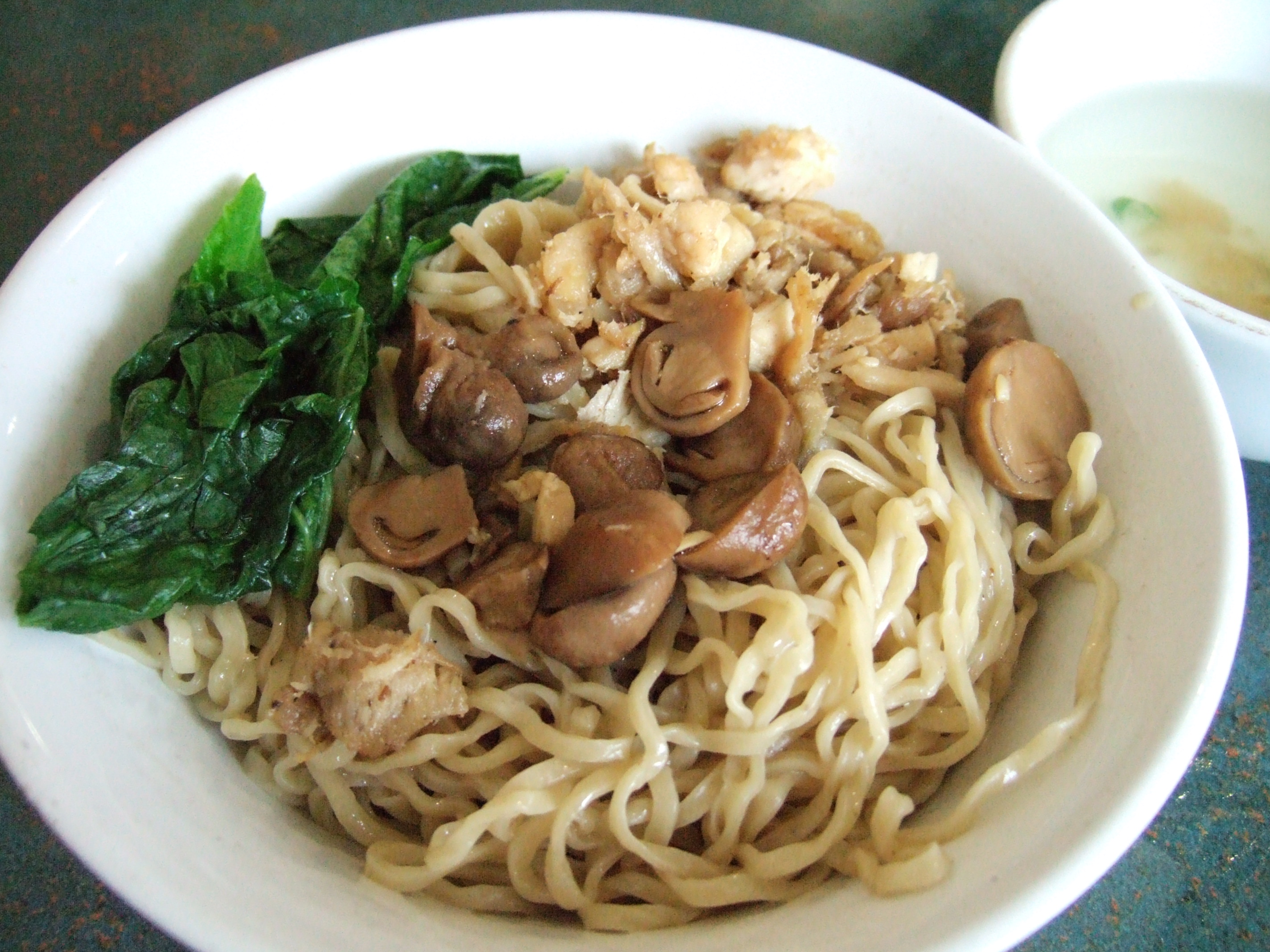
Mie ayam with mushroom, Chinese cabbage and chicken broth

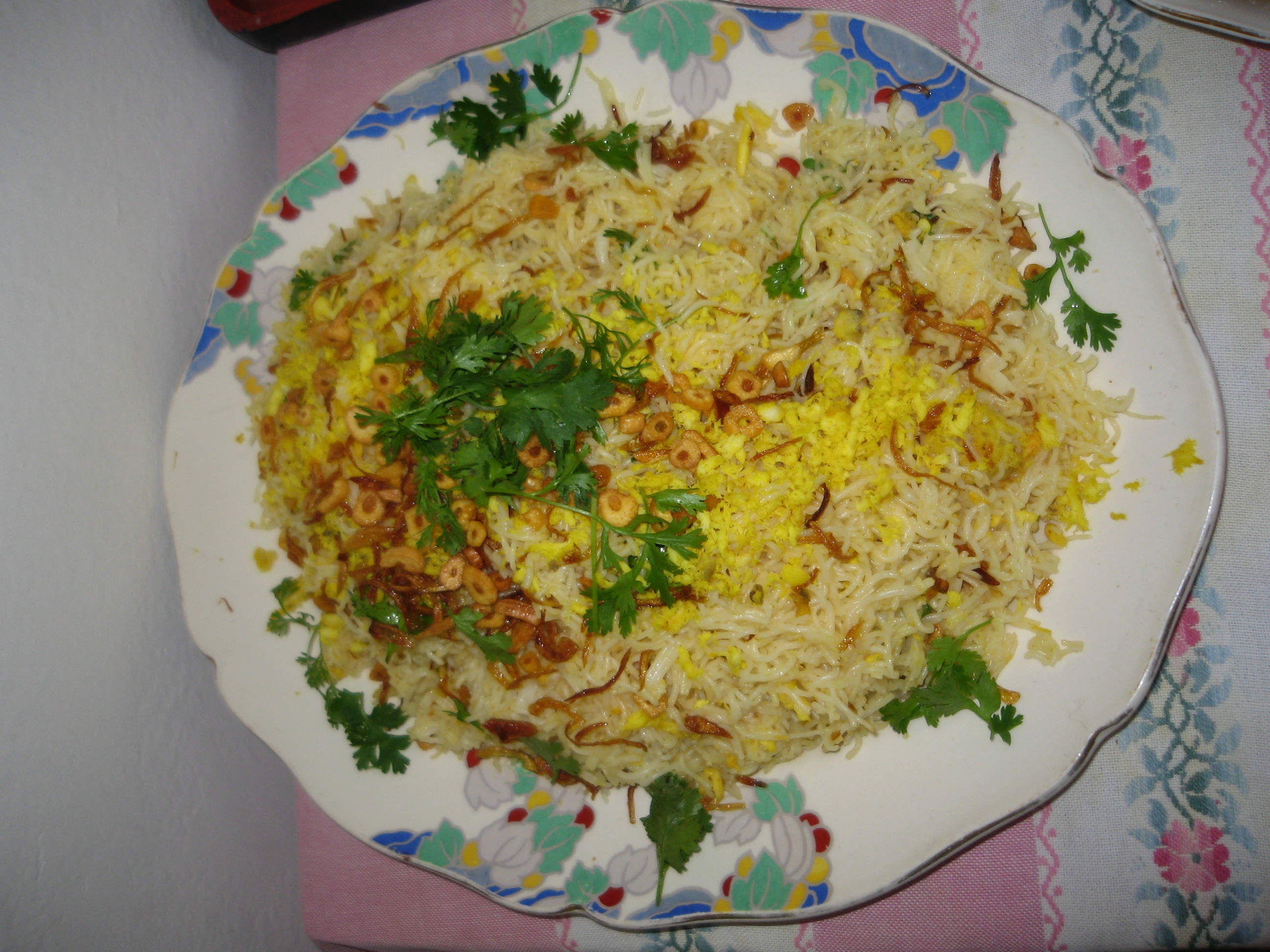
Rakhine mont di fish soup with garnish

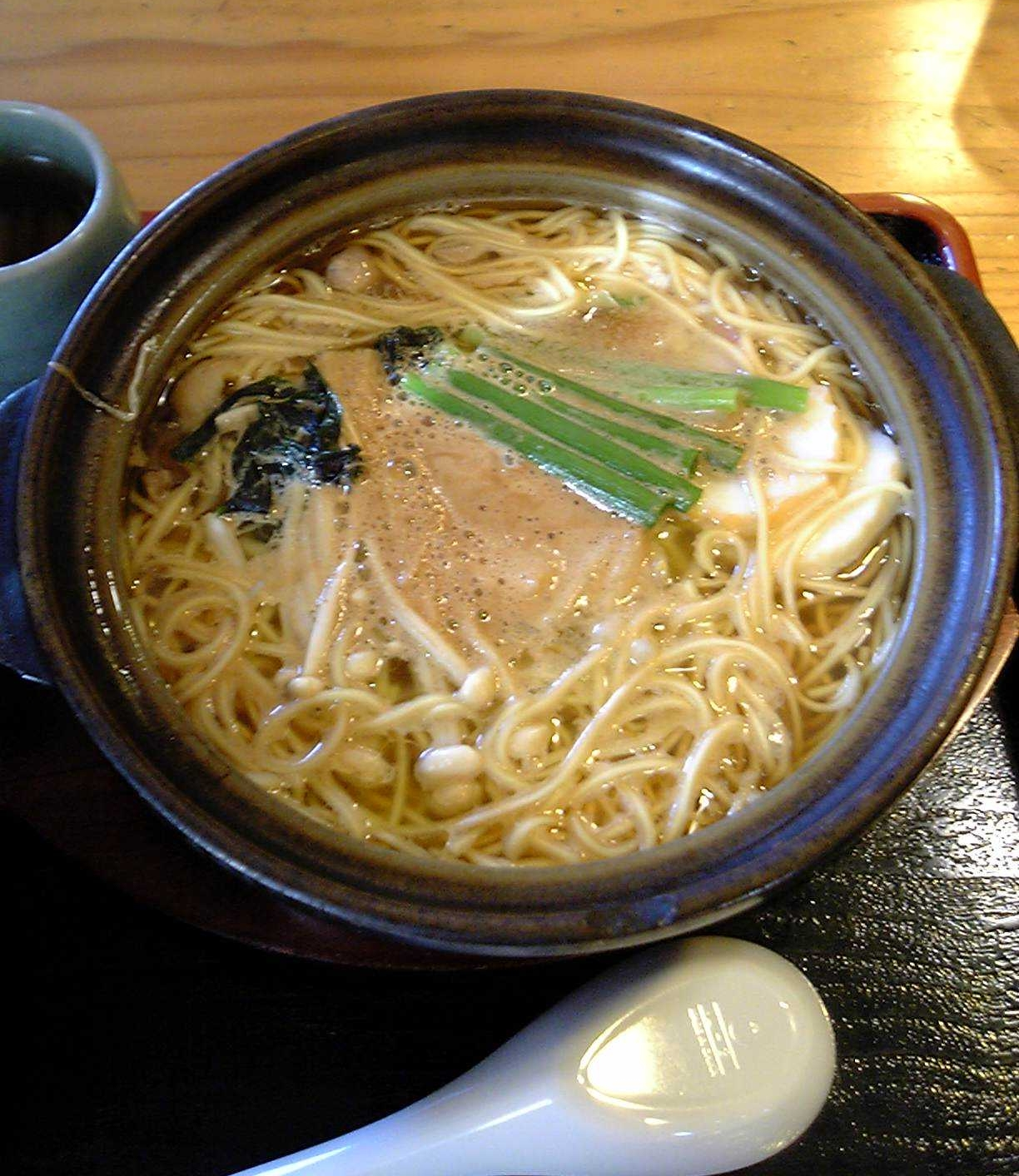
A bowl of nabeyaki (hot pot) ramen

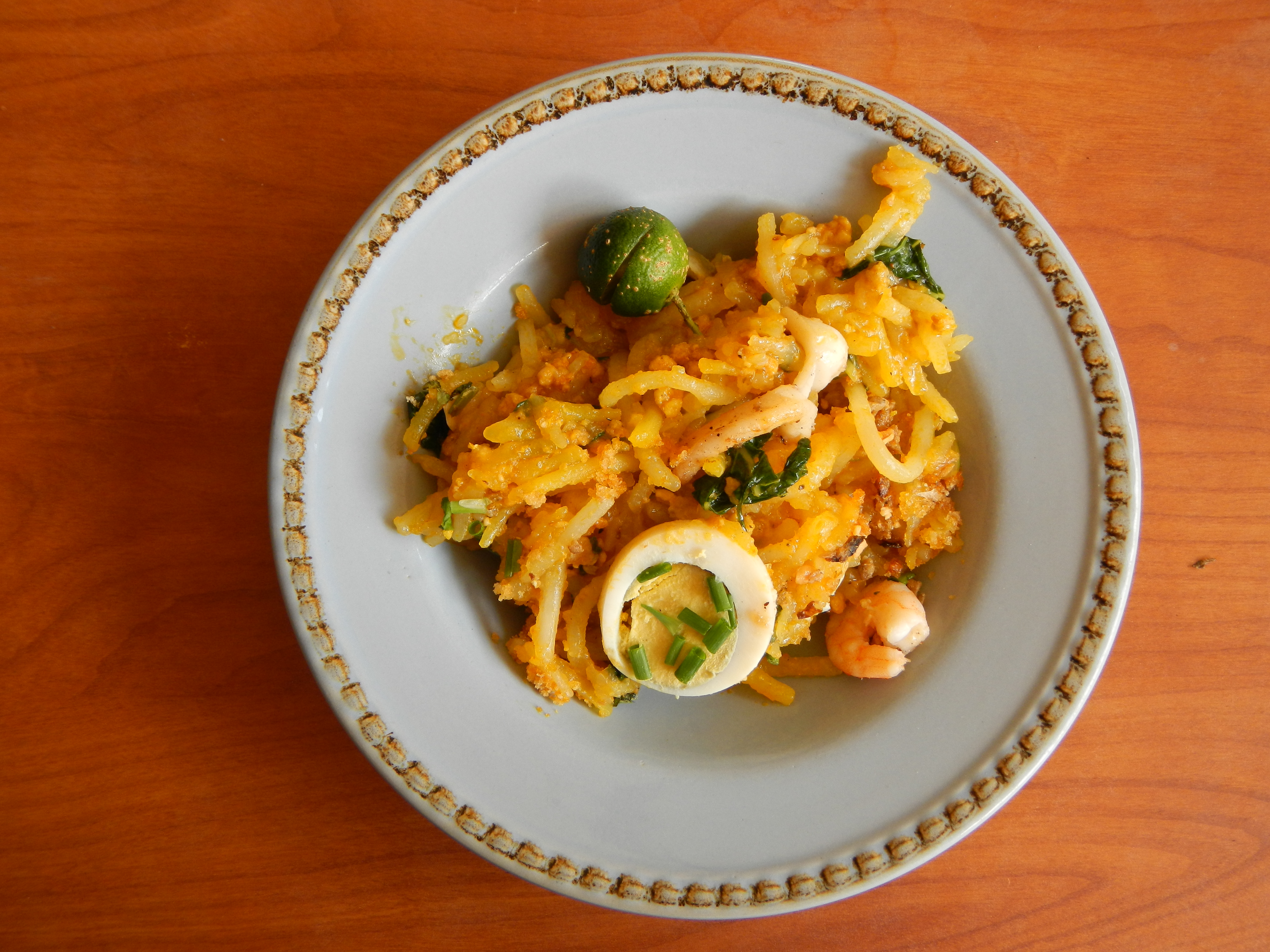
Pancit malabon (pancit luglug, pancit balabok), La Familia, Baliuag, Bulacan

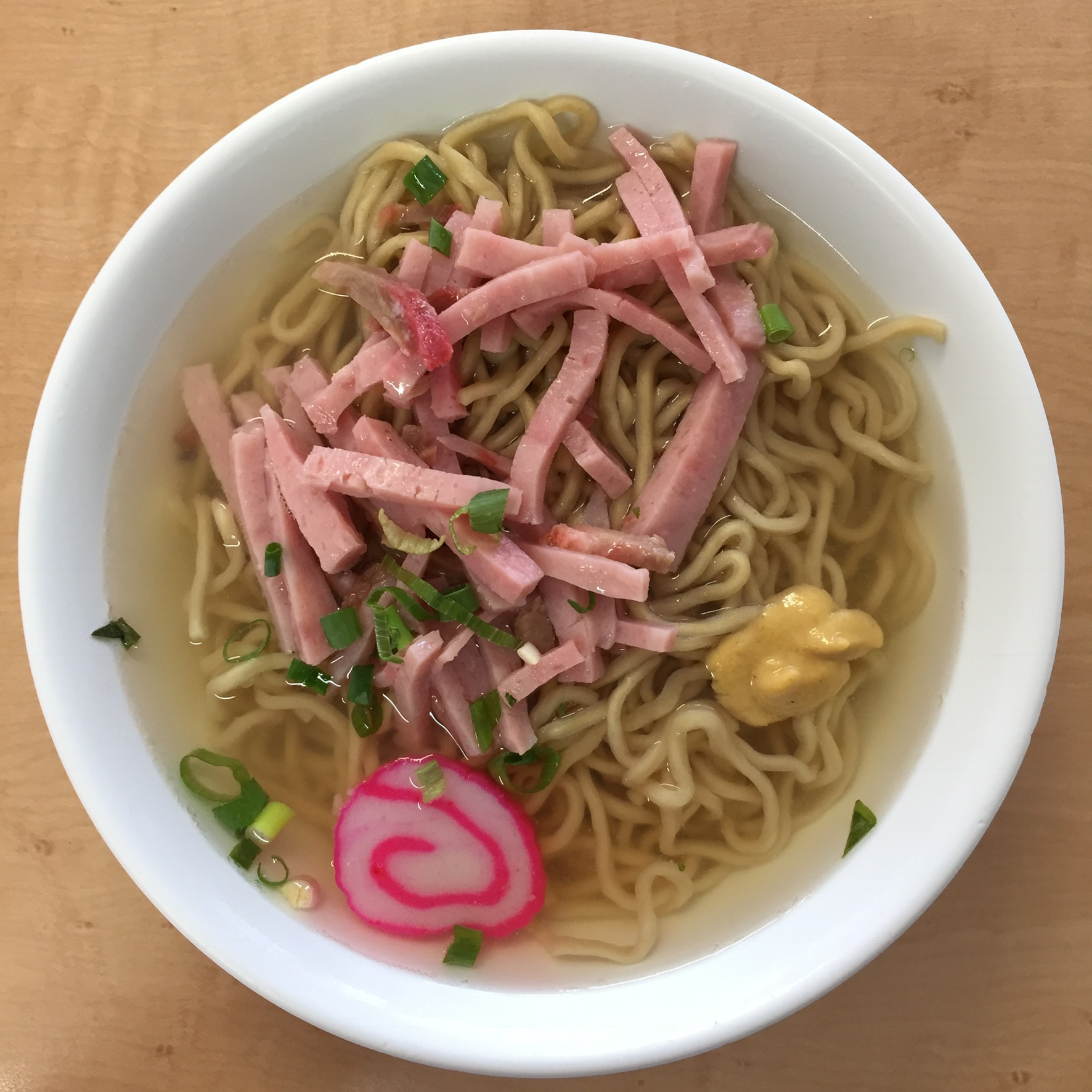
Saimin

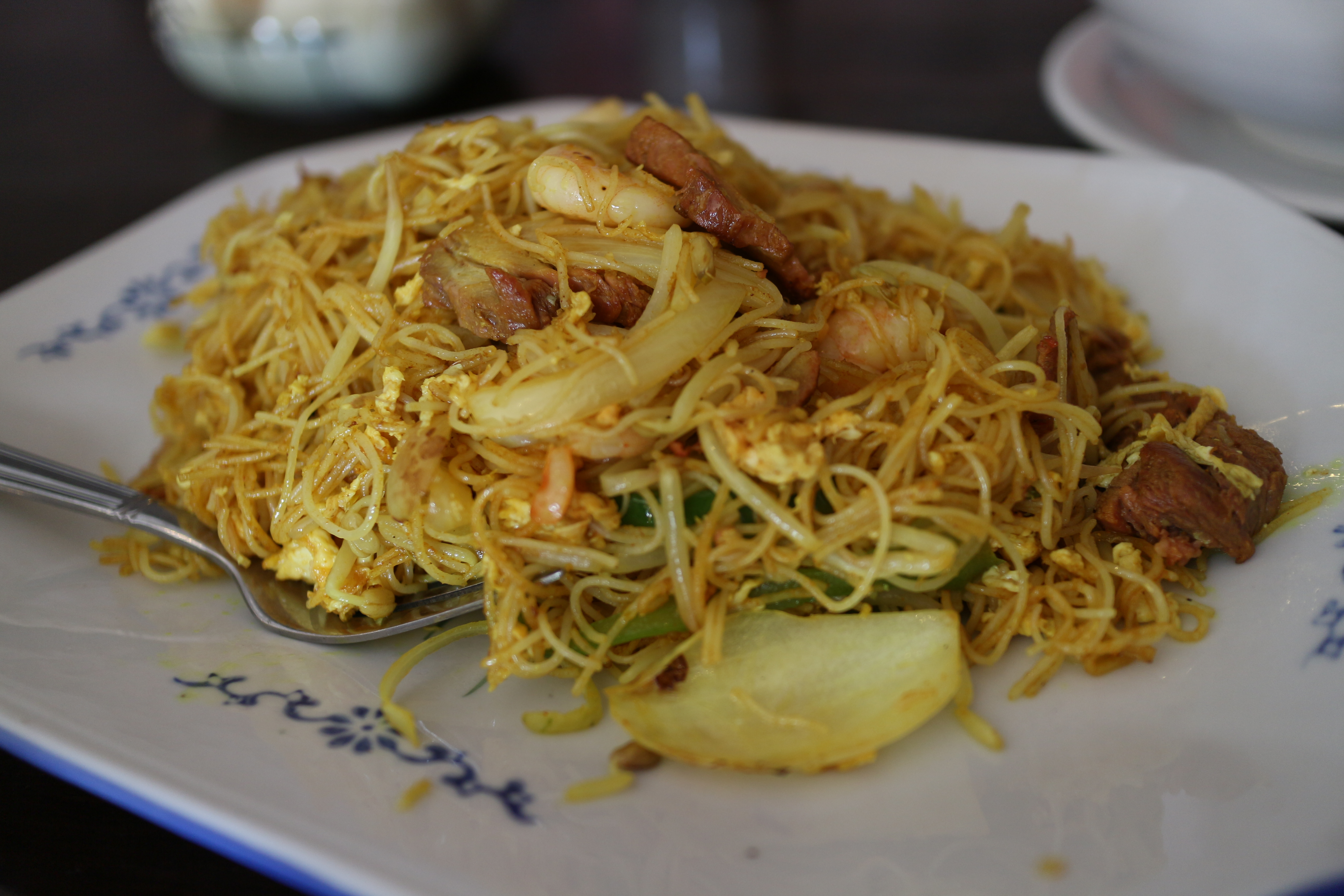
Singapore noodles

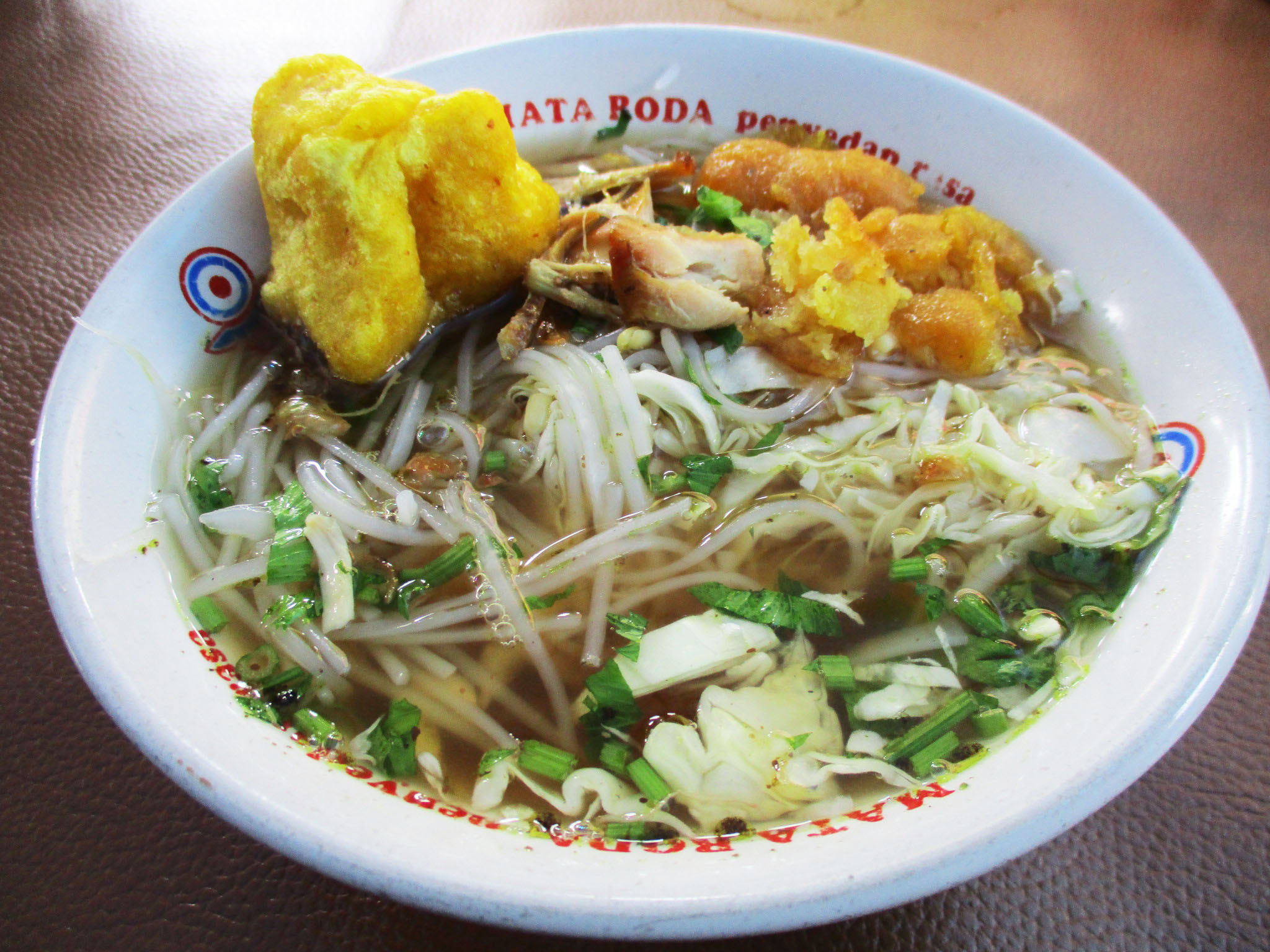
Soto ayam

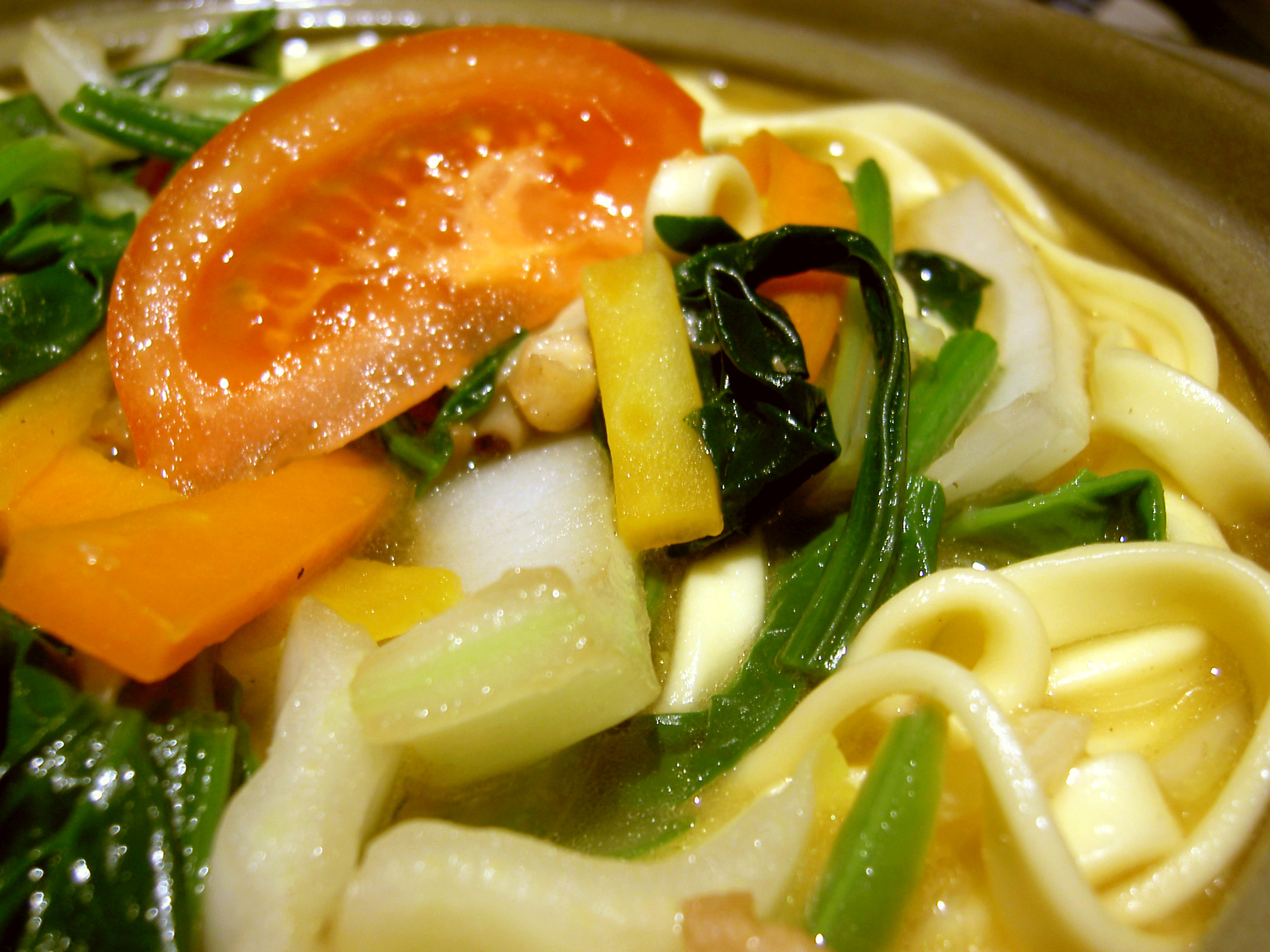
Thukpa

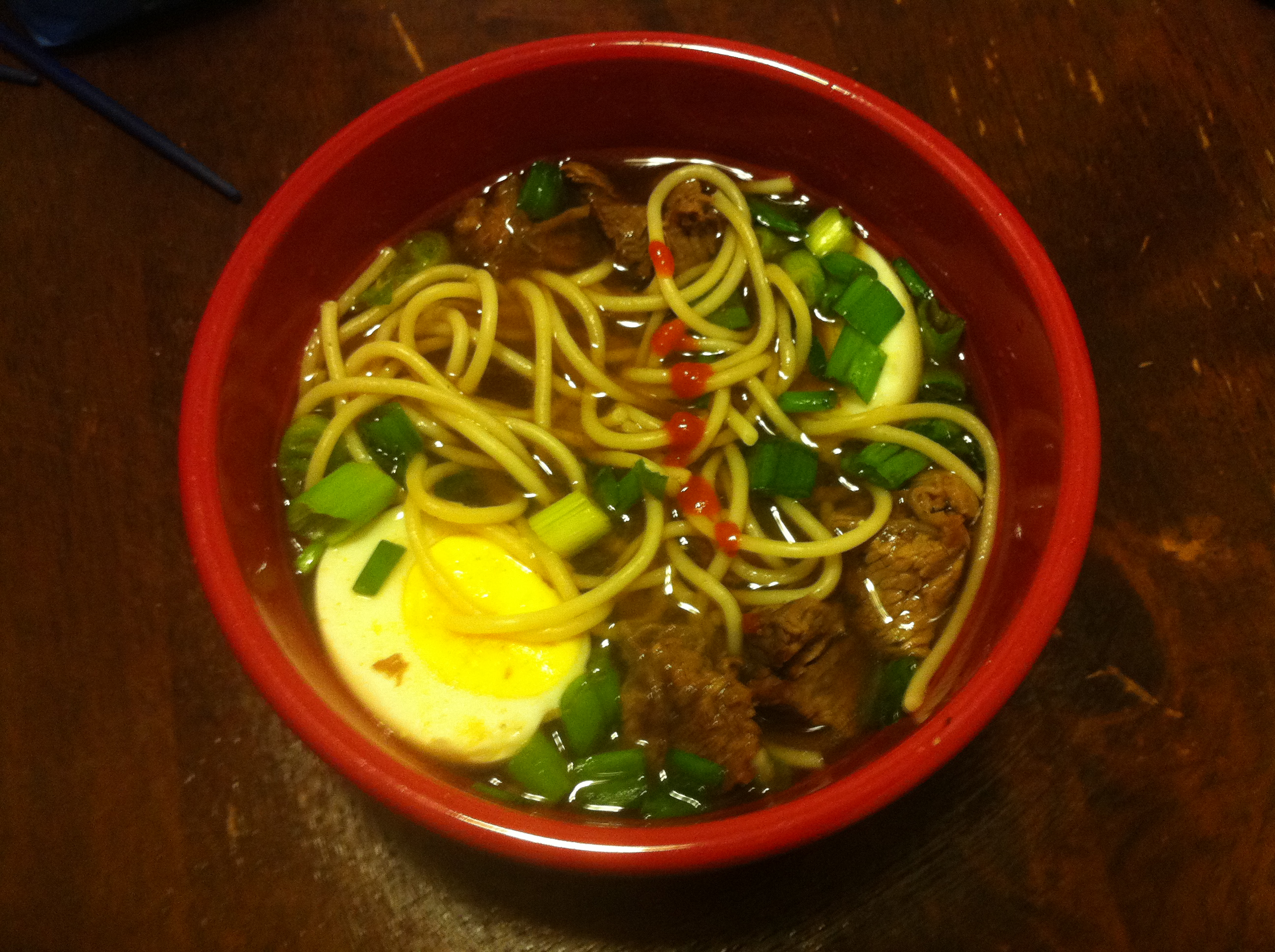
Yaka mein

- Fried noodles – A common dish throughout East Asia, Southeast Asia and South Asia; many varieties, cooking styles, and ingredients exist.
- Instant noodles, or instant ramen, are noodles sold in a precooked and dried block with either a flavoring powder, a packet of sauce, and/or seasoning oil; the flavoring is usually in a separate packet, although in the case of cup noodles, the flavoring is often loose in the cup.
- Noodle soup – A variety of soups with noodles and other ingredients served in a light broth, a common dish across East Asia, Southeast Asia and the Himalayan states of South Asia; various types of noodles are used, such as rice noodles, wheat noodles, and egg noodles.

== East Asia ==
=== Chinese ===
There is a great variety of Chinese noodles, which vary according to their region of production, ingredients, shape or width, and manner of preparation. They are an important part of most regional cuisines within China, as well as in Taiwan, Singapore, and other Southeast Asian nations with sizable overseas Chinese populations.

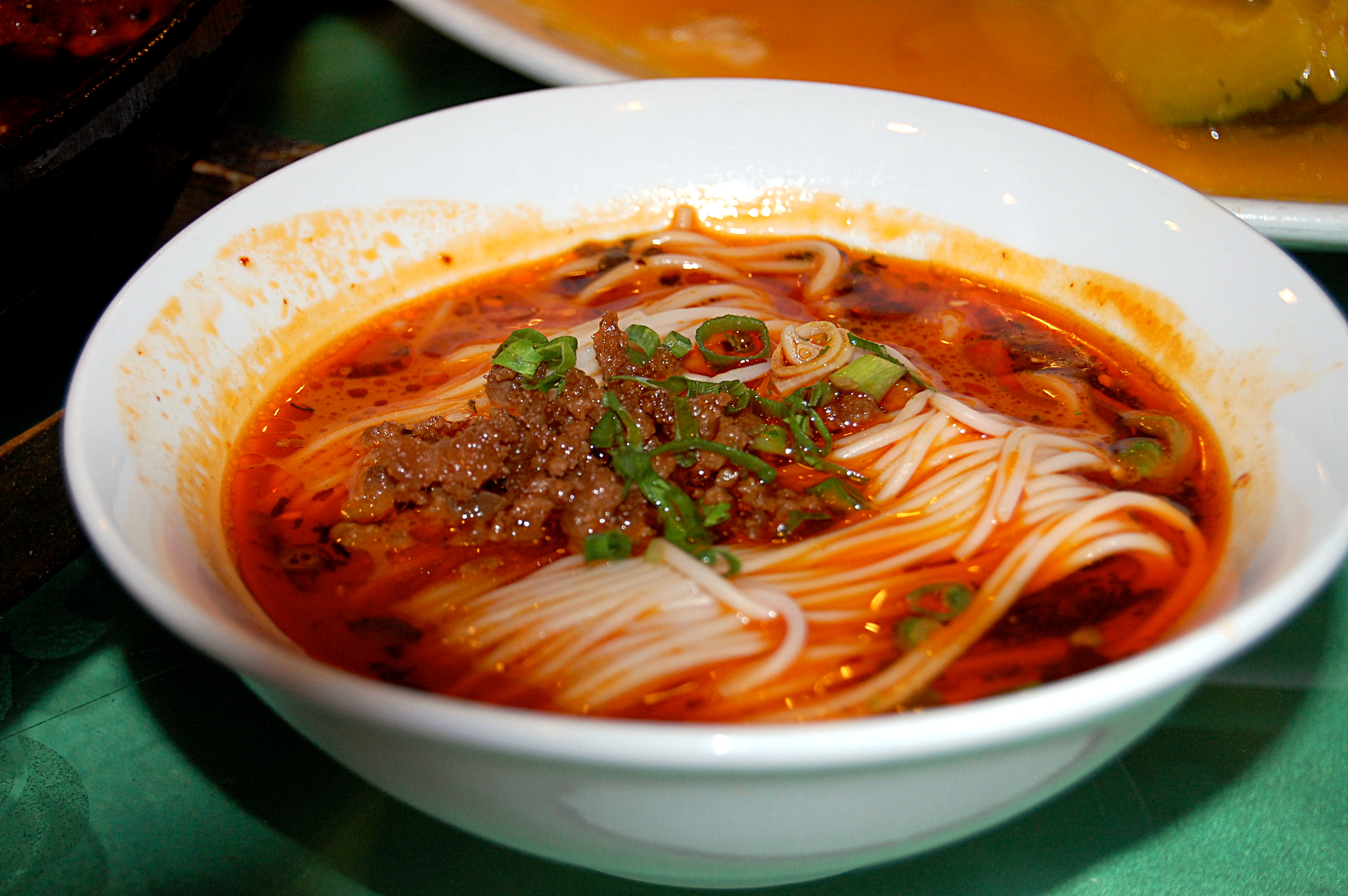
Dandan noodles

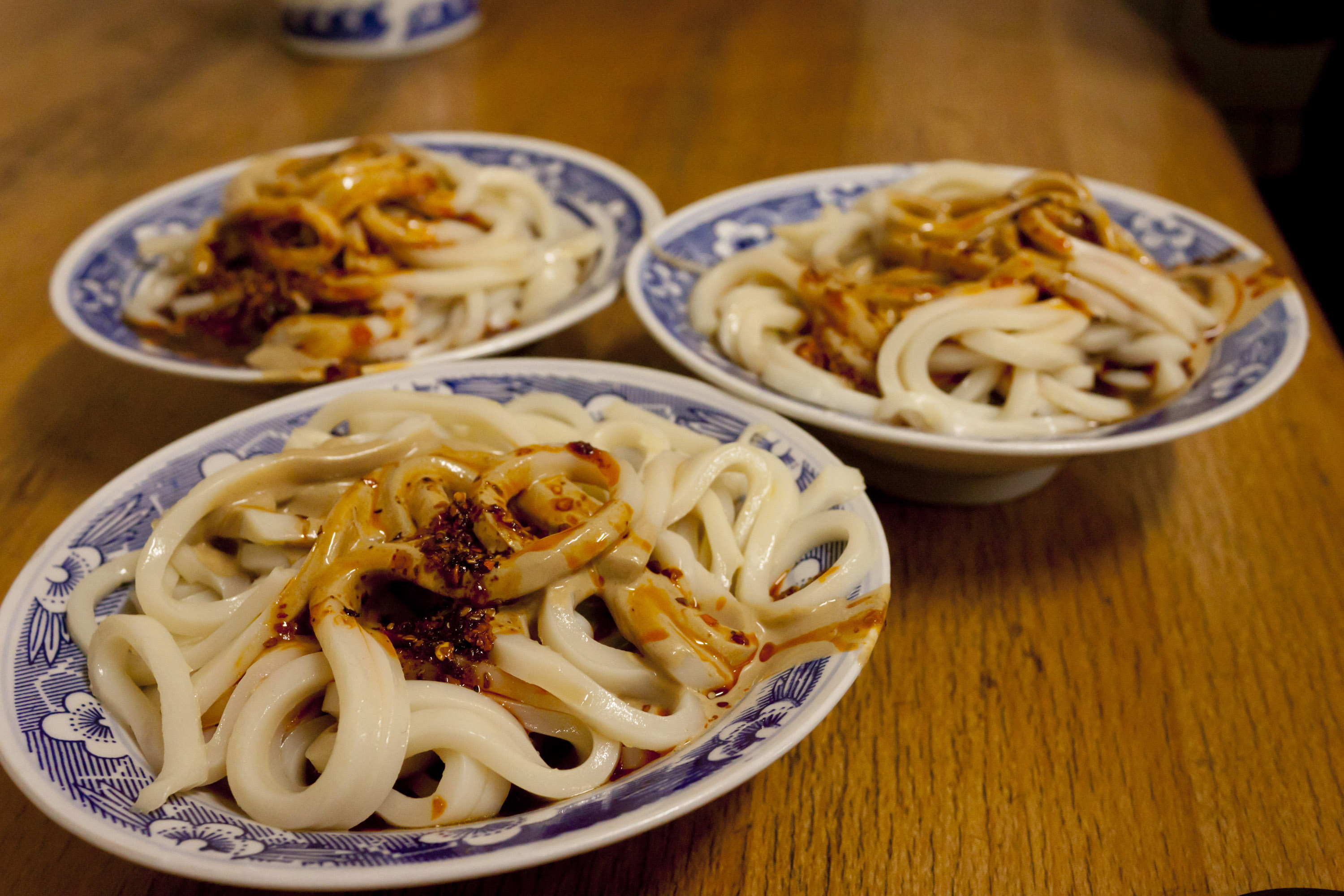
Liangpi

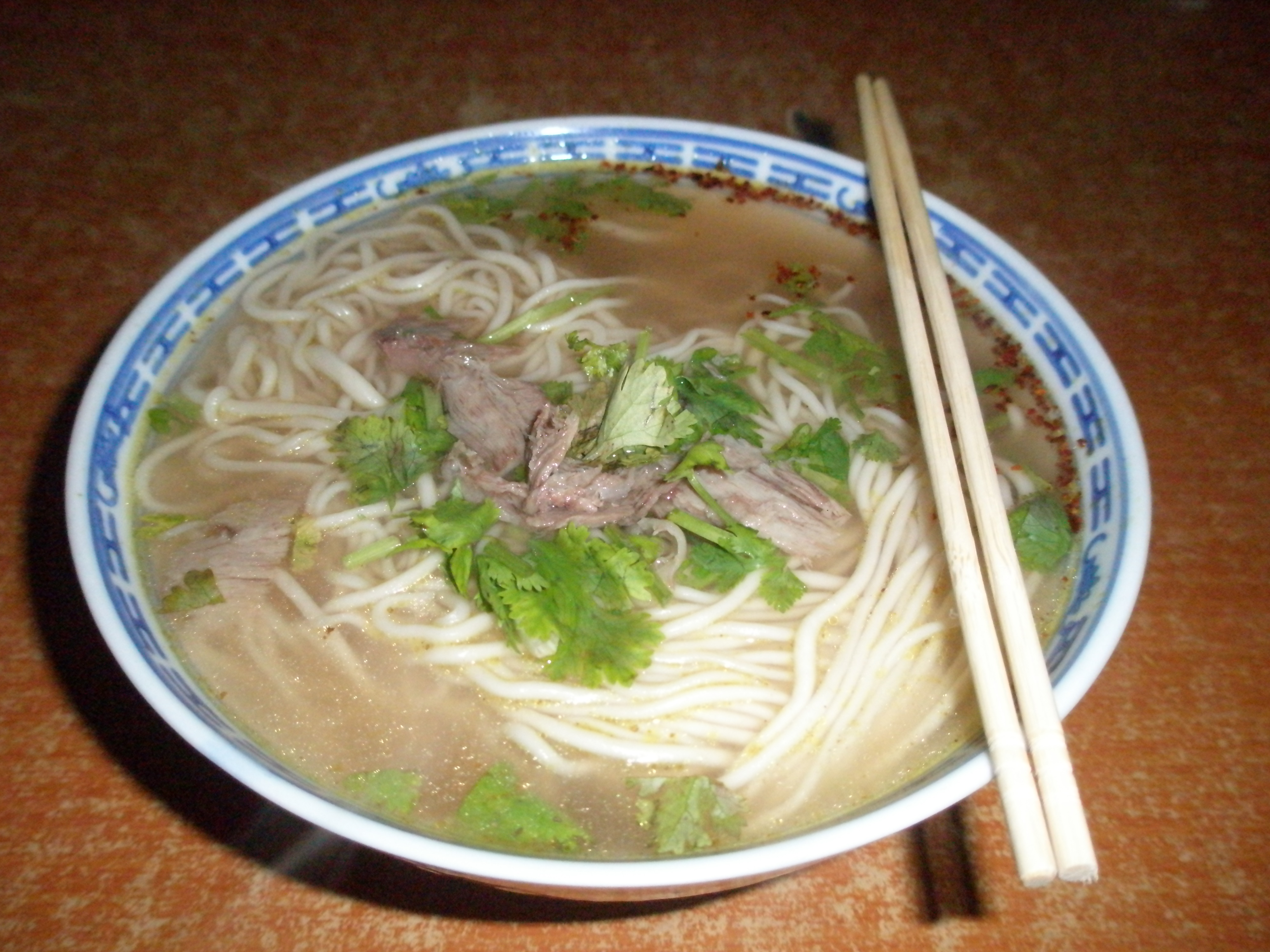
Lanzhou beef lamian

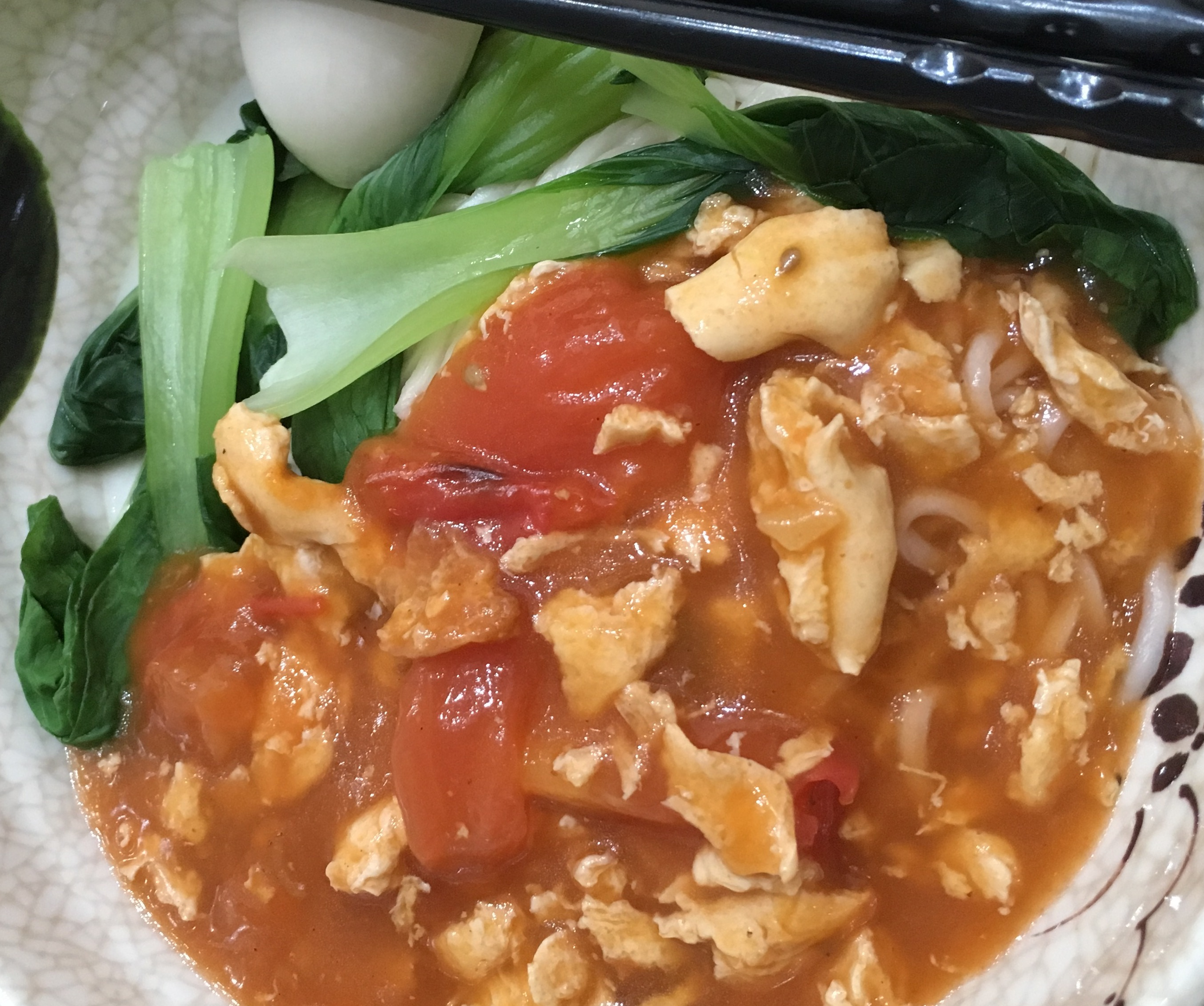
Noodles with tomato egg sauce

- Ants climbing a tree – Sichuan dish
- Banmian – Chinese noodle dish
- Beef noodle soup – Category of noodle dishes
- Biangbiang noodles – Type of Chinese noodles
- Cart noodle – Noodle dish traditionally sold by street vendors from carts
- Chongqing noodles – Spicy noodle dish from Chongqing, China
- Chow mein – Chinese stir-fried noodles
- Crossing the bridge noodles – Rice noodle soup from Yunnan, China
- Kuanfen noodles (宽粉) — Chinese potato noodle dish
- Dan zai noodles – Taiwanese noodle dish
- Dandan noodles – Chinese noodle dish
- Hokkien mee – Southeast Asian noodle dish
- Hot and sour noodles – Chinese noodle dish
- Hot dry noodles – Noodle dish from Wuhan, China
- Hui mian – Henan-style noodle soup
- Jiangshui noodles – Chinese noodle dish
- Lanzhou beef noodle soup – Beef noodle soup from Lanzhou, China
- Liangpi – Chinese noodle-like dish
- Lo mein – Chinese egg noodle dish
- Huoguo dun fen — Sichuan hotpot dish
- Luosifen – Chinese rice noodle dish originated from Liuzhou, Guangxi
- Mee pok – Chinese noodle dish
- Millinge – Chinese noodle dish
- Misua – Type of Chinese wheat noodles
- Noodles with tomato egg sauce – Chinese dish
- Paomo – Chinese traditional dish from Xi'an
- Satay bee hoon – Singaporean satay dish
- Shanghai fried noodles – Chinese noodle dish
- Su-style noodle
- Suan la fen — Sichuan potato noodle stew
- Wonton noodles – Cantonese noodle dish
- Yuntunmian – Cantonese noodle dish
- Zhajiangmian – Chinese noodle dish

=== Hong Kong ===
- Wonton noodles – Cantonese noodle dish
- Beef chow fun – Beef and noodle Cantonese dish
- Cart noodle – Noodle dish traditionally sold by street vendors from carts

=== Japanese ===
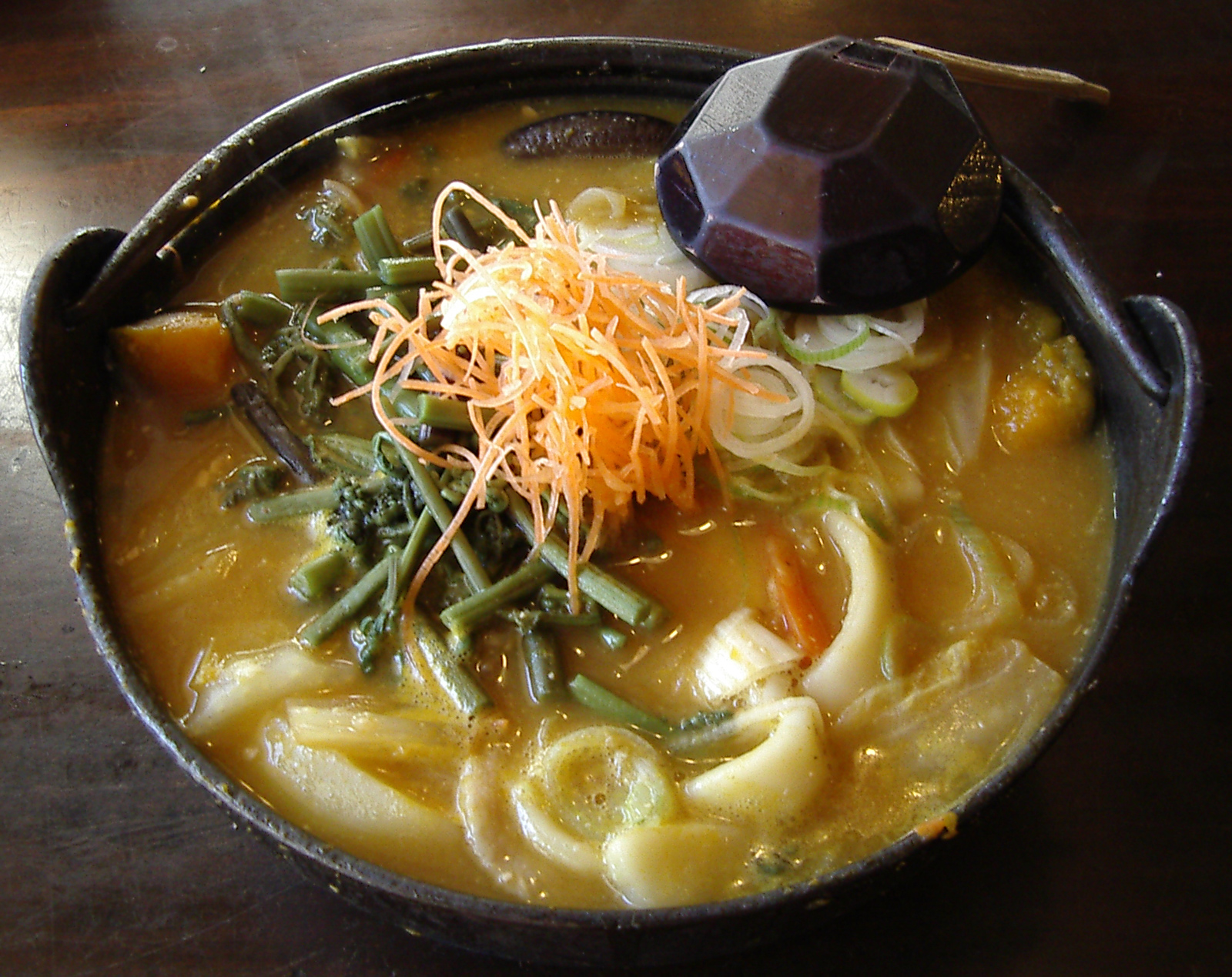
Hōtō

Japanese noodles are a staple part of Japanese cuisine. They are often served chilled with dipping sauces, or in soups or hot dishes.

- Champon – Noodle dish from Japanese-Chinese cuisine
- Hiyashi chūka – Chinese-style Japanese noodle dish
- Hōtō – Popular regional dish from Yamanashi, made by stewing flat udon noodles and vegetables in miso soup.
- Okinawa soba – Type of Japanese noodle
- Ramen – Japanese noodle dish
  - Tsukemen – Japanese noodle dish
- Sara udon – Japanese noodle dish topped with vegetables
- Soba – Thin Japanese noodle made from buckwheat flour
  - Tensoba – Japanese noodle dish
  - Toshikoshi soba – Noodle dish eaten in Japan on New Year's Eve
- Sōmen – Type of East Asian noodles
- Udon – Thick noodle made from wheat flour
  - Yaki udon – Thick noodle made from wheat flour
- Yakisoba – Japanese fried noodle dish
  - Otaru Ankake Yakisoba – A regional variety from Otaru, Hokkaido.

=== Korean ===
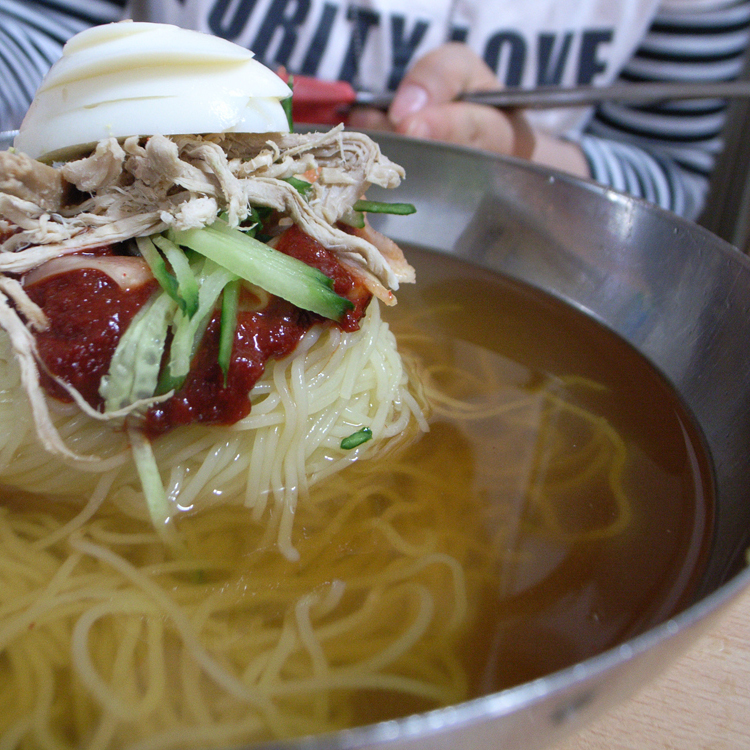
Milmyeon

- Bibim guksu – Korean cold, spicy dish made with thin wheat flour noodles
- Jajangmyeon or Jjajangmyeon – A Chinese-style Korean noodle dish topped with a thick sauce made of chunjang, diced pork, and vegetables; variants of the dish use seafood, or other meats.
- Janchi guksu – Korean noodle dish
- Japchae – Korean stir-fried noodle dish
- Jatguksu – Korean noodle dish in pine nut broth
- Jjamppong – Korean spicy noodle dish
- Jjolmyeon – Korean noodle dish
- Kalguksu – Korean noodle dish
- Kongguksu – Korean noodle dish in soy milk broth
- Makguksu – Korean buckwheat noodle dish
- Milmyeon – Korean noodle dish
- Naengmyeon – Korean cold noodle dish
- Ulmyeon – Korean-Chinese noodle dish
- Yukgaejang – Korean spicy beef soup
- Bulgogi Udon - Thick noodle made from wheat flour with bulgogi

=== Mongolian ===
- Tsuivan - Mongolian noodle dish with meat and vegetables; usually served plain or in milk tea.
- Guriltai Shul – Mongolian noodle soup; consists of mutton or beef with vegetables and fried noodles.
- Khuitsai - Mongolian noodle; consists of glass noodles with beef or meatballs.

=== Taiwanese ===
- A-gei – Taiwanese dish
- Eel noodles – Taiwanese noodle dish
- Nabeyaki egg noodles
- Neritic squid rice noodles
- Oyster vermicelli – Taiwanese noodle soup
- Pumpkin rice vermicelli
- Ta-a noodles – Taiwanese noodle dish
- Taiwanese beef noodle soup
- Tshik-á-mī

=== Tibetan ===
- Guthuk – A noodle soup in Tibetan cuisine.
- Laping – A spicy cold mung bean noodle dish in Tibetan cuisine, a street food also popular in some parts of Nepal.
- Thenthuk – A hand-pulled noodle soup (thukpa)
- Thukpa – Tibetan noodle soup

== South East Asia ==
=== Burmese ===
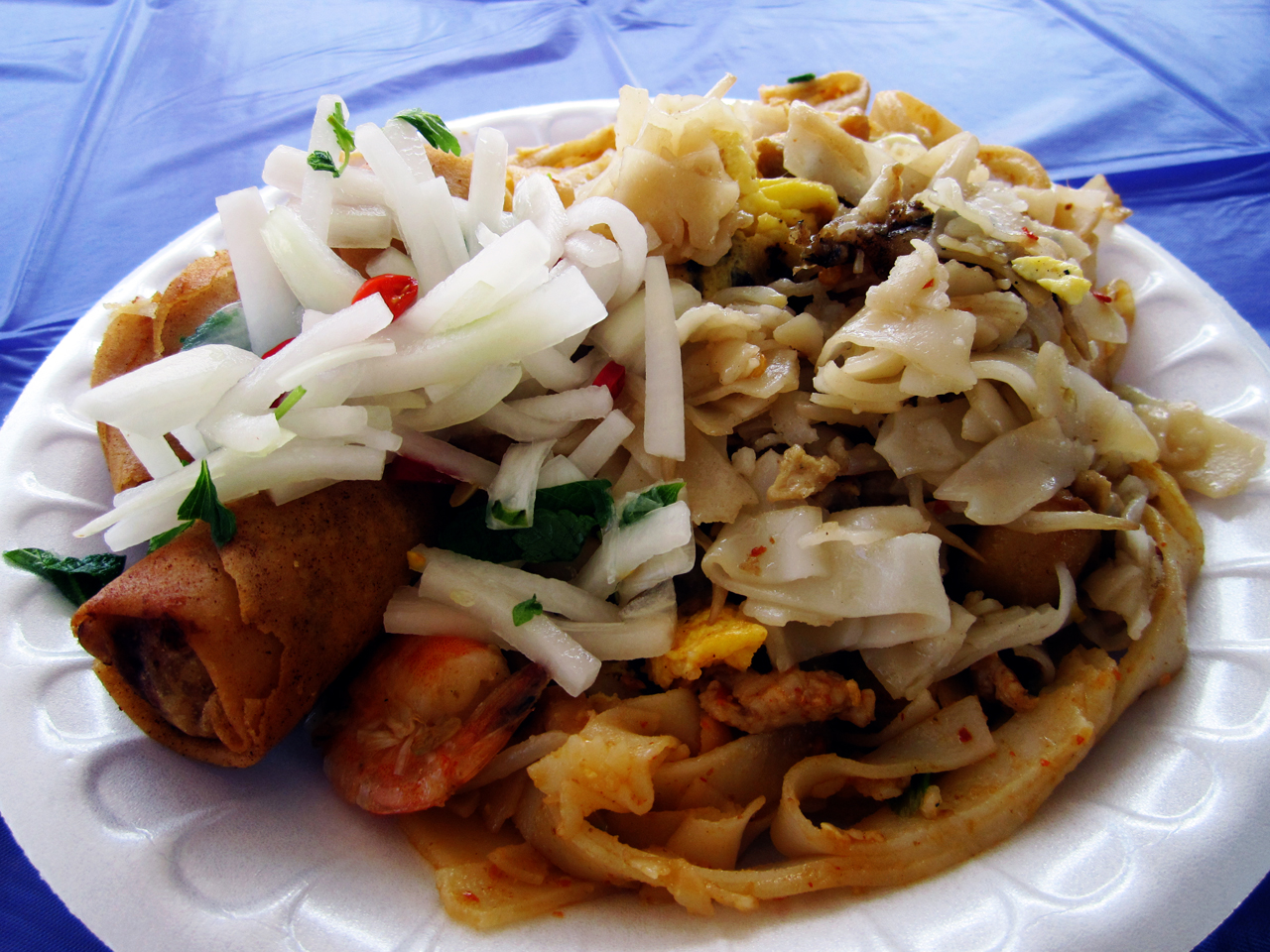
Kat kyi kaik

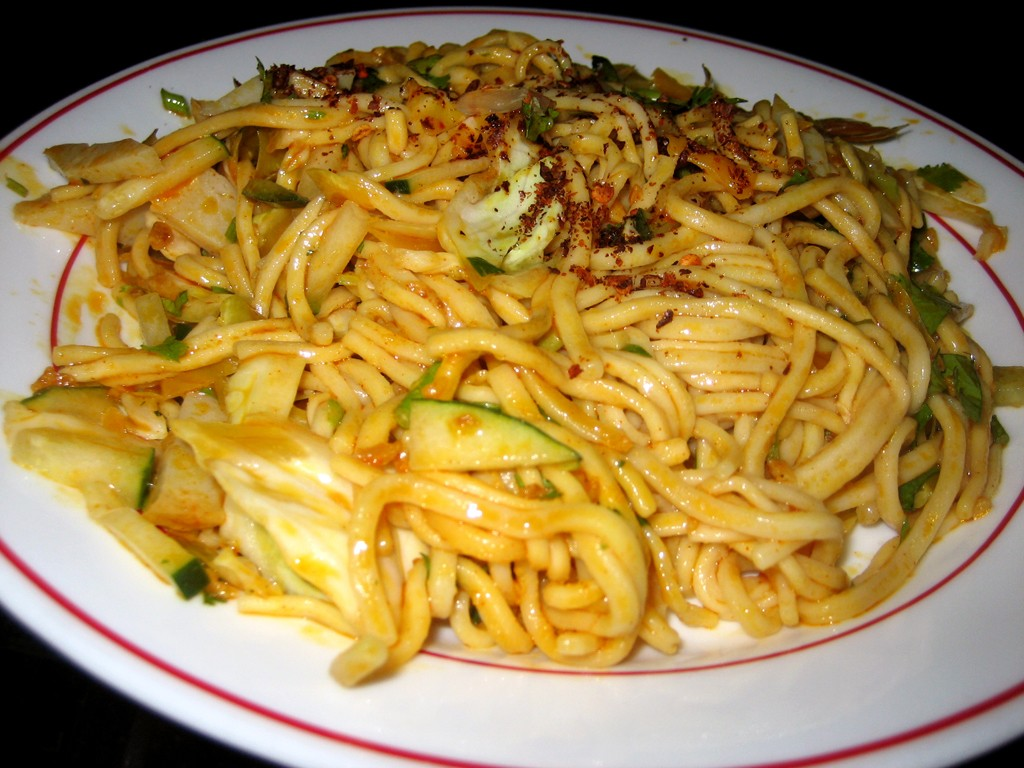
Khauk swè thoke

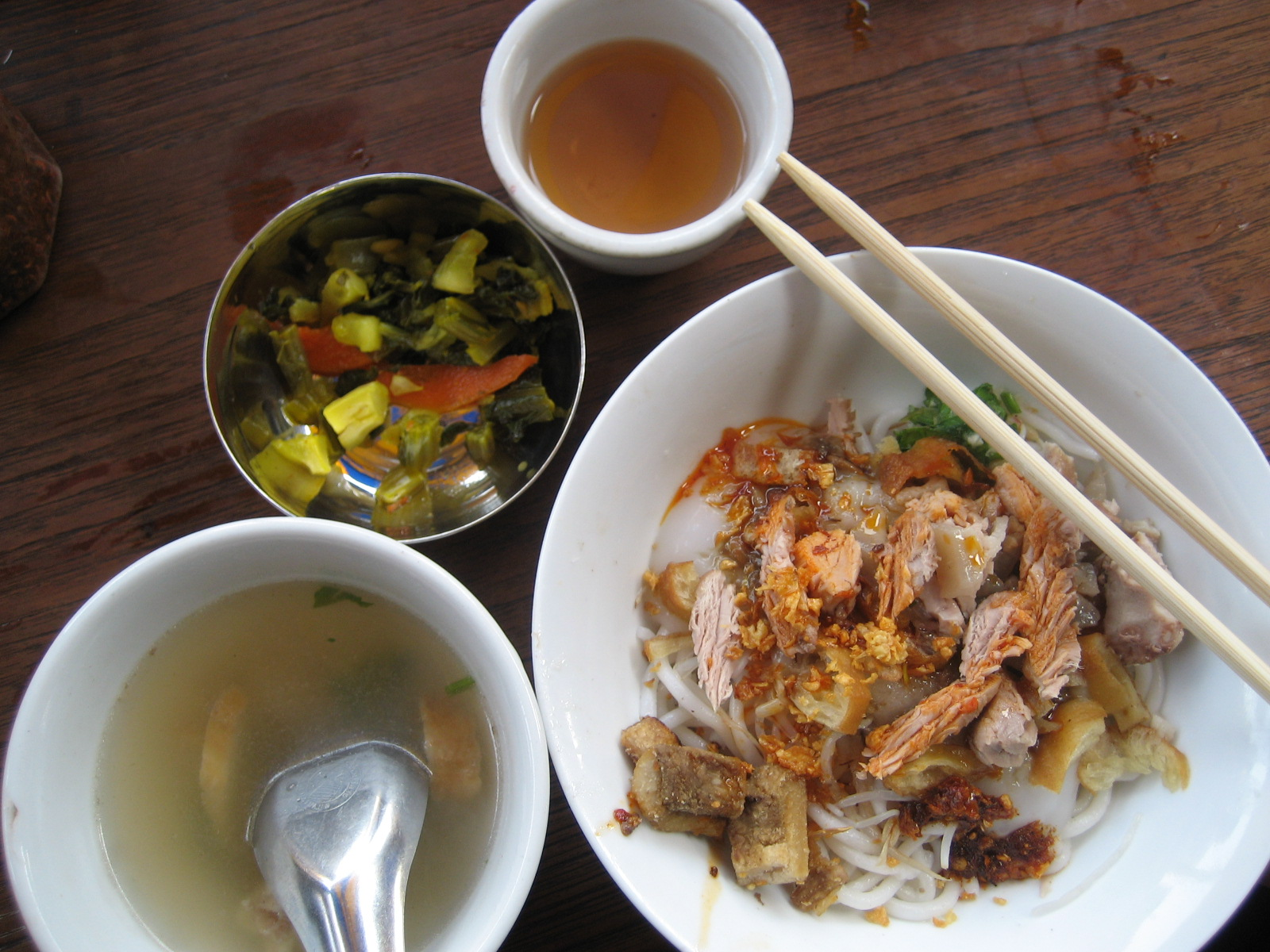
Meeshay

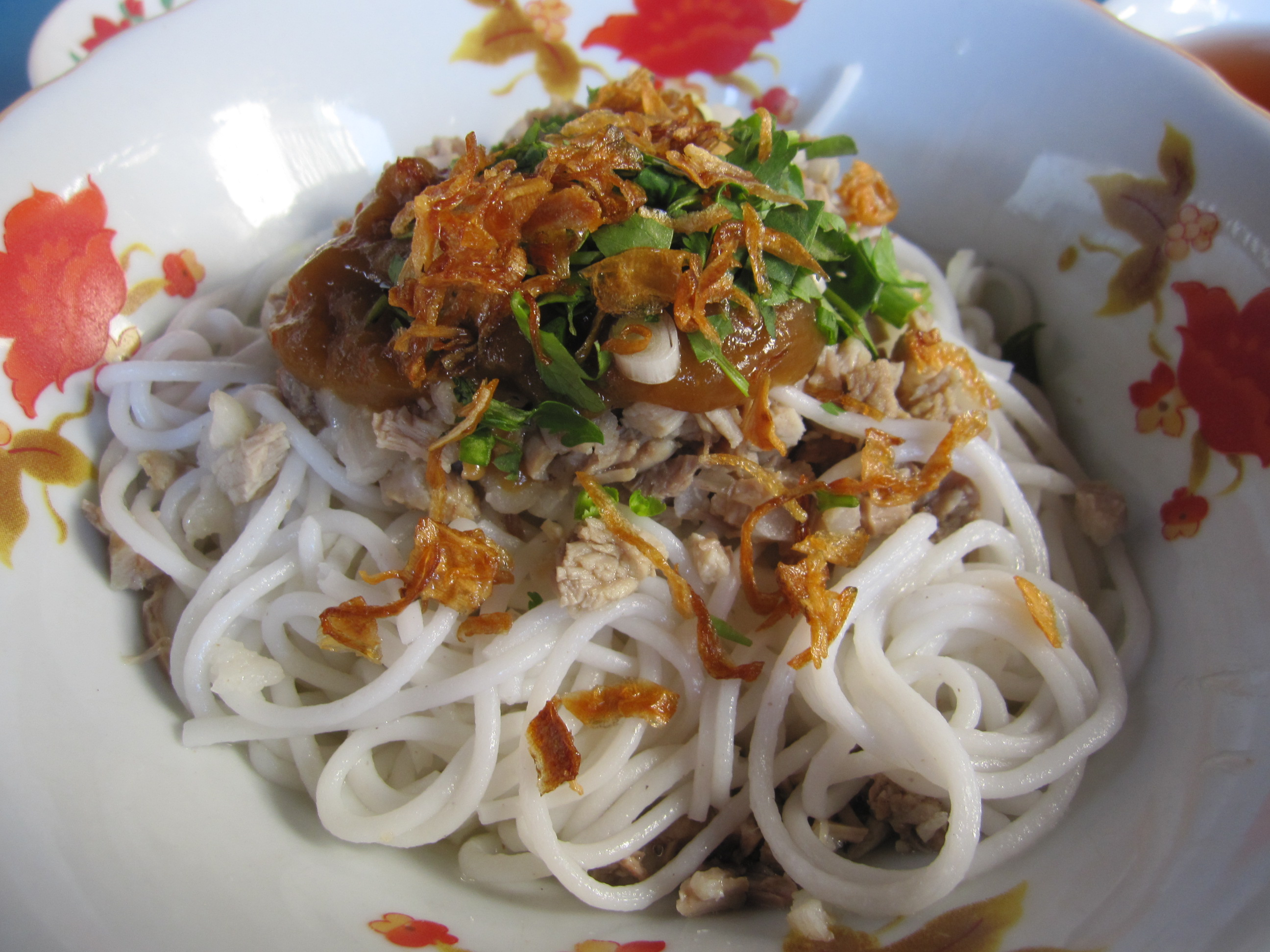
Mogok meeshay

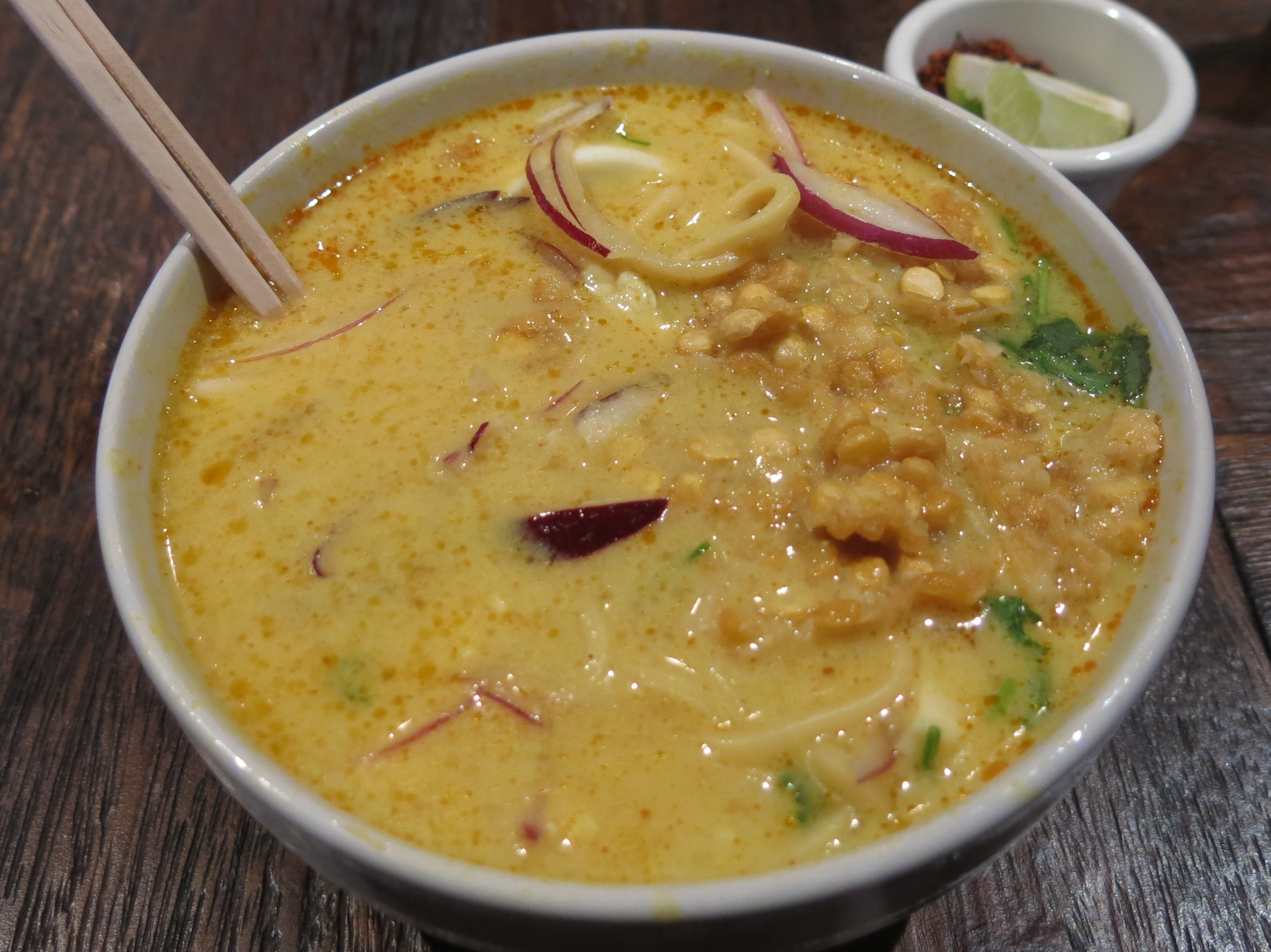
Ohn no khao swè

- Kat kyi kaik – a spicy Burmese fried noodle dish
- Khauk swè thoke – a wheat noodle salad made with dried shrimp, shredded cabbage, carrots, fish sauce, lime and dressed with fried peanut oil
- Khow suey – A noodle soup made of egg noodles and curried beef or chicken with coconut milk, served with a variety of contrasting condiments. Khow suey, aka ohn no khao swè, originated in Burma, came to East India with Indians who migrated from Burma during World War II.
- Kyay oh – a popular noodle soup made with pork and egg
- Kya zan hinga – a glass noodle in chicken consommé dish
- Meeshay – Also spelt mi shay, mee shay, mee shei, is rice noodles with meat sauce.
- Mohinga – rice noodle and fish soup considered by many to be the national dish of Myanmar
- Mont di – a collective term for Burmese dishes made with thin rice noodles
- Nan gyi thohk – an a thoke salad dish made with thick round rice noodles mixed with chicken curry and chili oil
- Ohn no khao swè – wheat noodles in a curried chicken and coconut milk broth thickened with chickpea flour
- Sigyet khauk swè – a fried noodle dish usually including garlic and duck
- Shan khauk swè – a "soup version" of meeshay without gel, and fish sauce instead of soy sauce, with flat or round noodles, where the soup is part of the dish itself, rather than as consommé

=== Cambodian ===
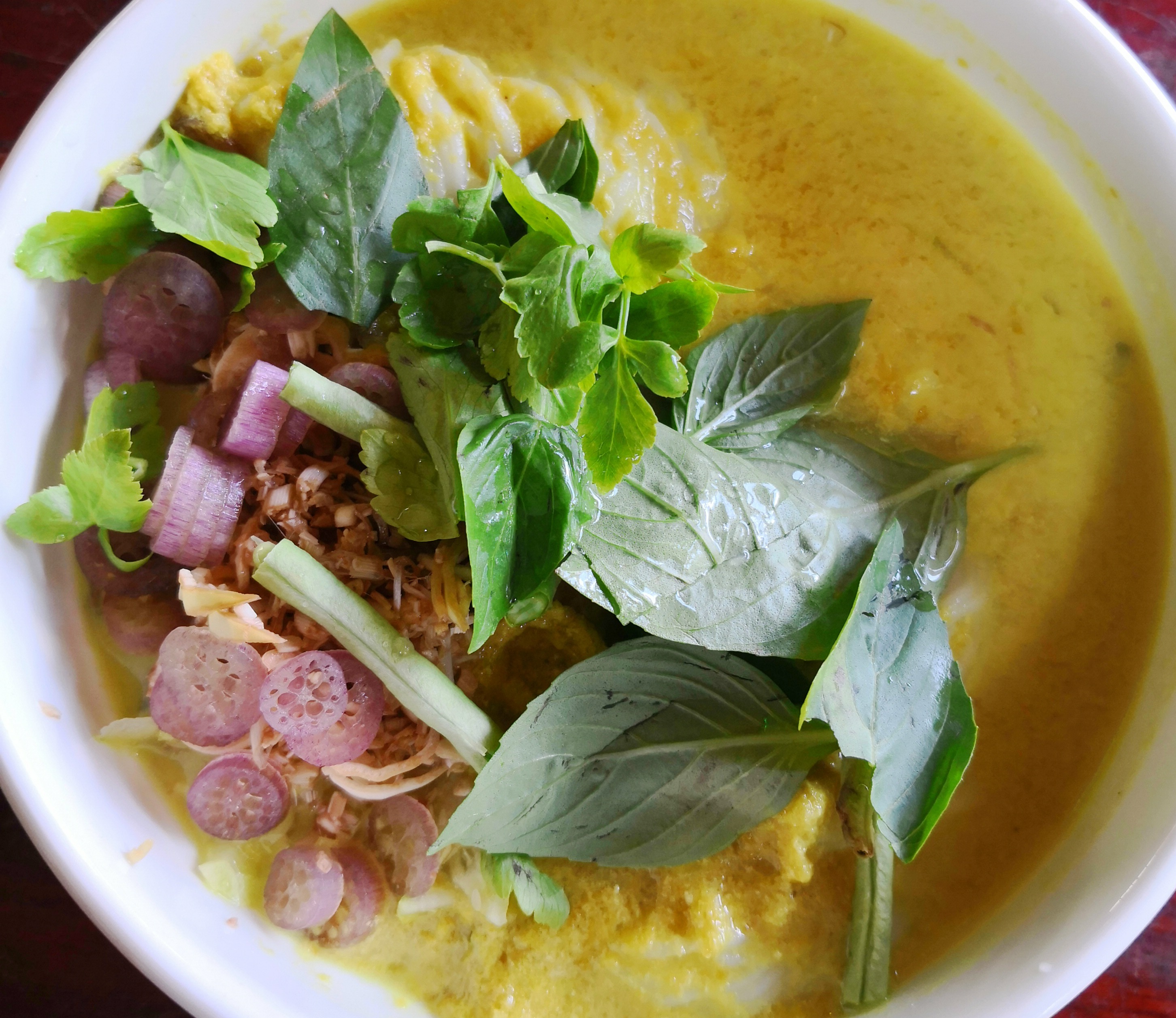
Num banhchok

- Banh kanh – thick noodles used in Cambodia and Vietnam
- Banh sung – thin noodles used in Cambodia and Vietnam
- Cha kuyteav – stir fry noodles with pork belly
- Kuyteav – a soup with rice noodles and pork stock with toppings
- Kuyteav kha kou – rice noodles in a beef stew or thick broth soup
- Lort cha – rice pin noodles stir-fried in fish sauce, soy sauce and palm sugar, with garlic, bean sprouts and scallions or chives
- Nem – many kinds of salads are made with this type of clear noodle
- Num banhchok – consists of rice vermicelli topped with a cool fish gravy and raw vegetables
- Num banhchok samla kari – similar, with curry
- Phnom Penh noodle soup – hot pork broth simmered with pork bone, dried shrimps, dried squids, and fresh daikon, grilled onion, and spices

=== Filipino ===
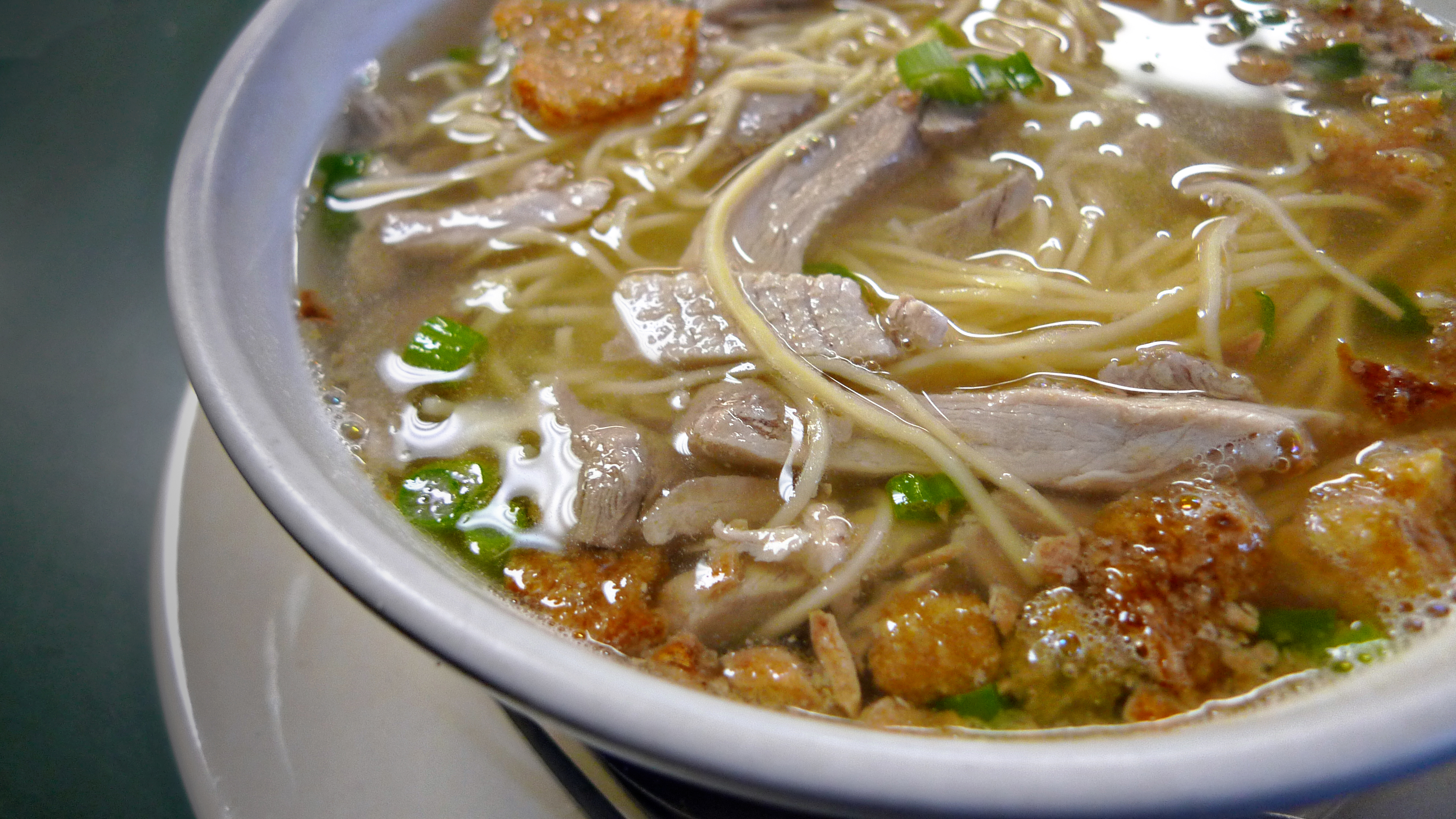
Batchoy

- Batchoy – Filipino noodle soup
- Kinalas – Philippine noodle dish
- Lomi – Filipino noodle dish
- Mami – Philippine noodle soup
- Odong – Filipino noodle dish
- Pancit – In Filipino cuisine, pancit (also spelt pansít) are noodles and the dishes made from them, typically using rice noodles.
- Pancit canton – Filipino fried noodle dish
- Pancit choca – Filipino black seafood noodle dish
- Pancit bihon – Thin dried noodles made of rice
- Pancit estacion – Filipino noodle dish
- Pancit luglug – Filipino fried noodle dish
- Pancit Malabon – Its sauce has a yellow-orange hue, attributable to achuete (annatto seeds), shrimp broth, and flavor seasoned with patis (fish sauce for a complex umami flavor) and crab fat.
- Pancit molo – Filipino pork dumpling soup
- Pancit miki – Filipino fried noodle dish
- Pancit palabok – Filipino fried noodle dish
- Pancit sotanghon
- Sopa de fideo – Type of stock-based noodle soup

=== Indonesian ===
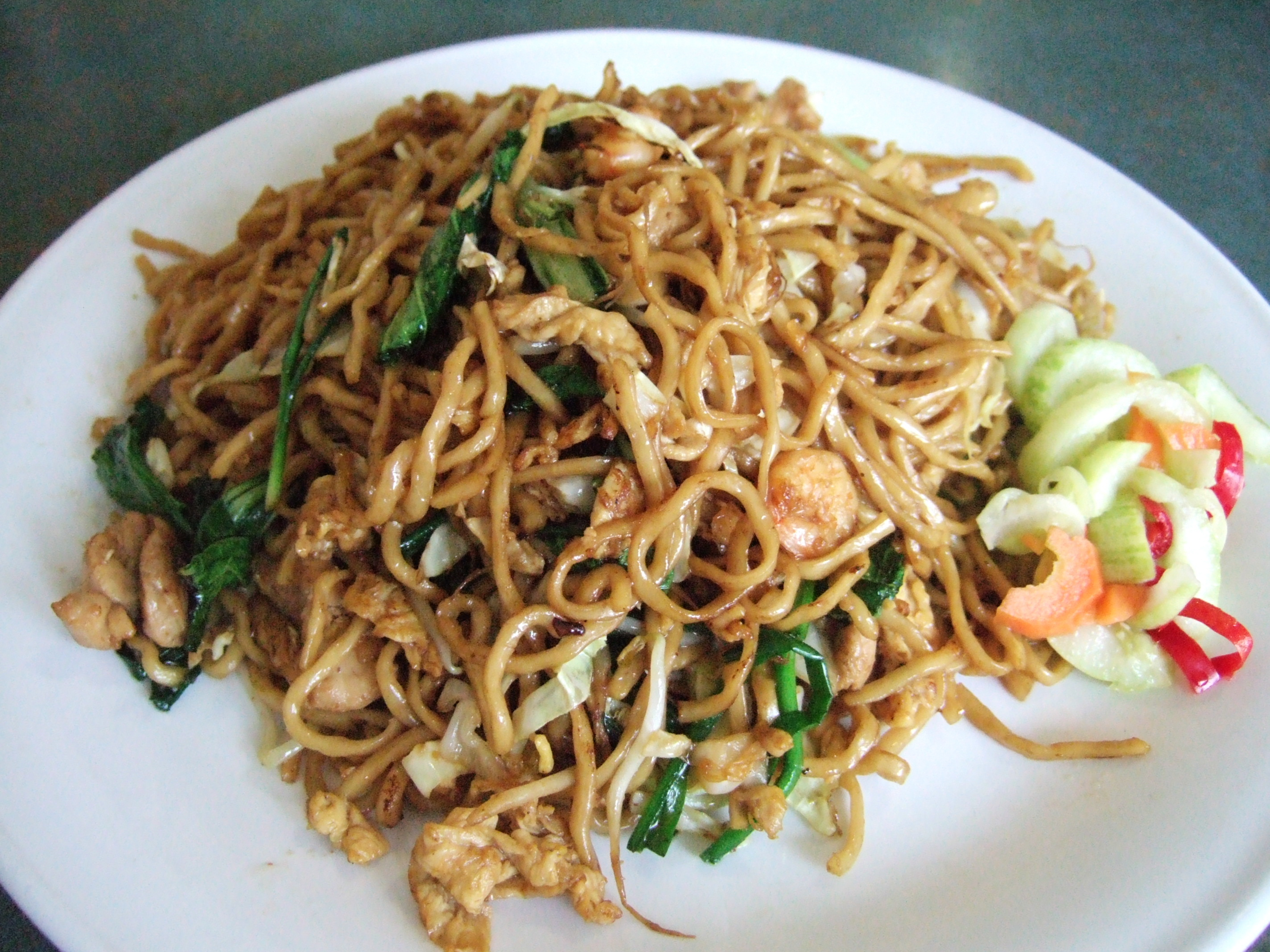
Mi goreng with chicken and shrimp in Jakarta

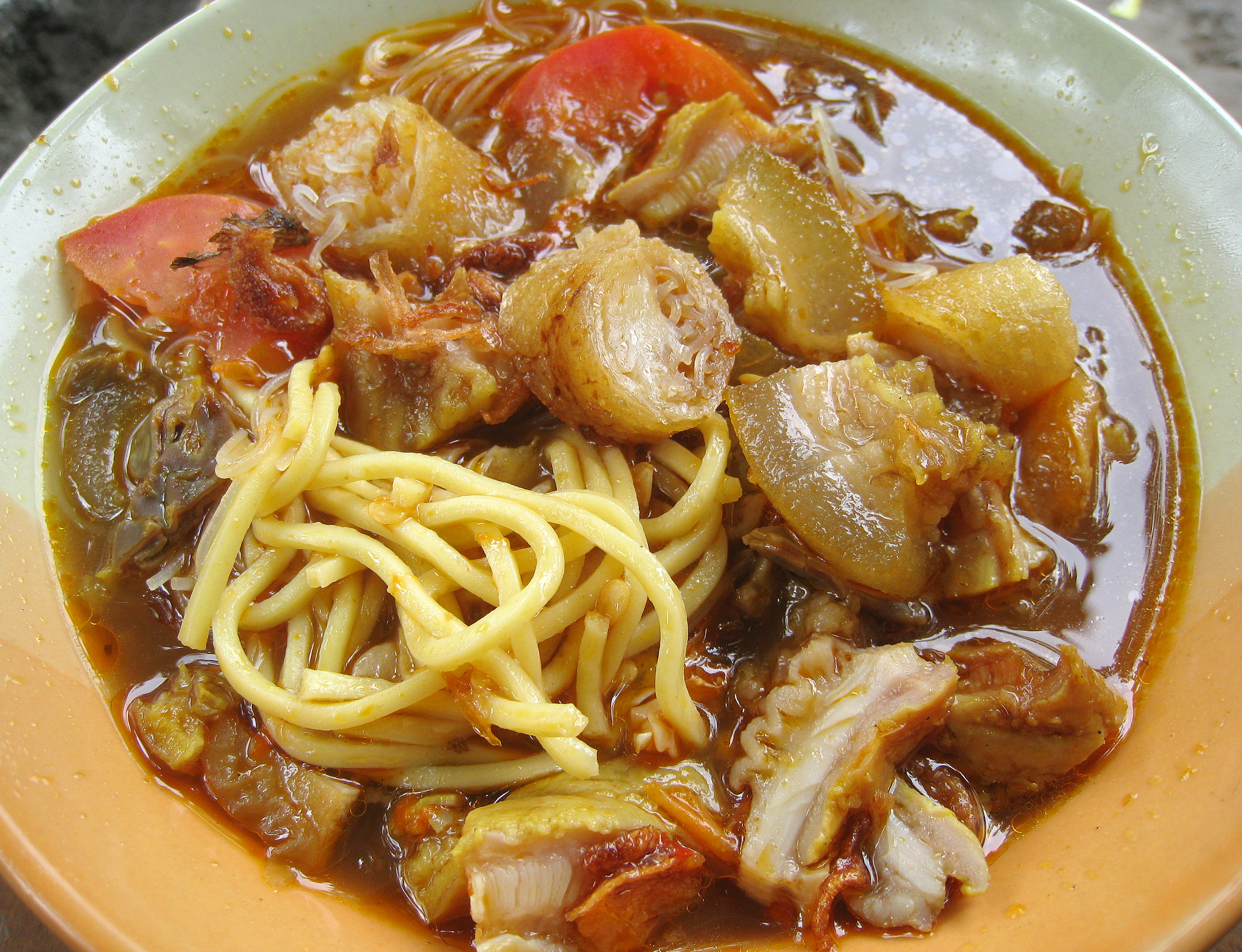
A soto mi with Bogor-style

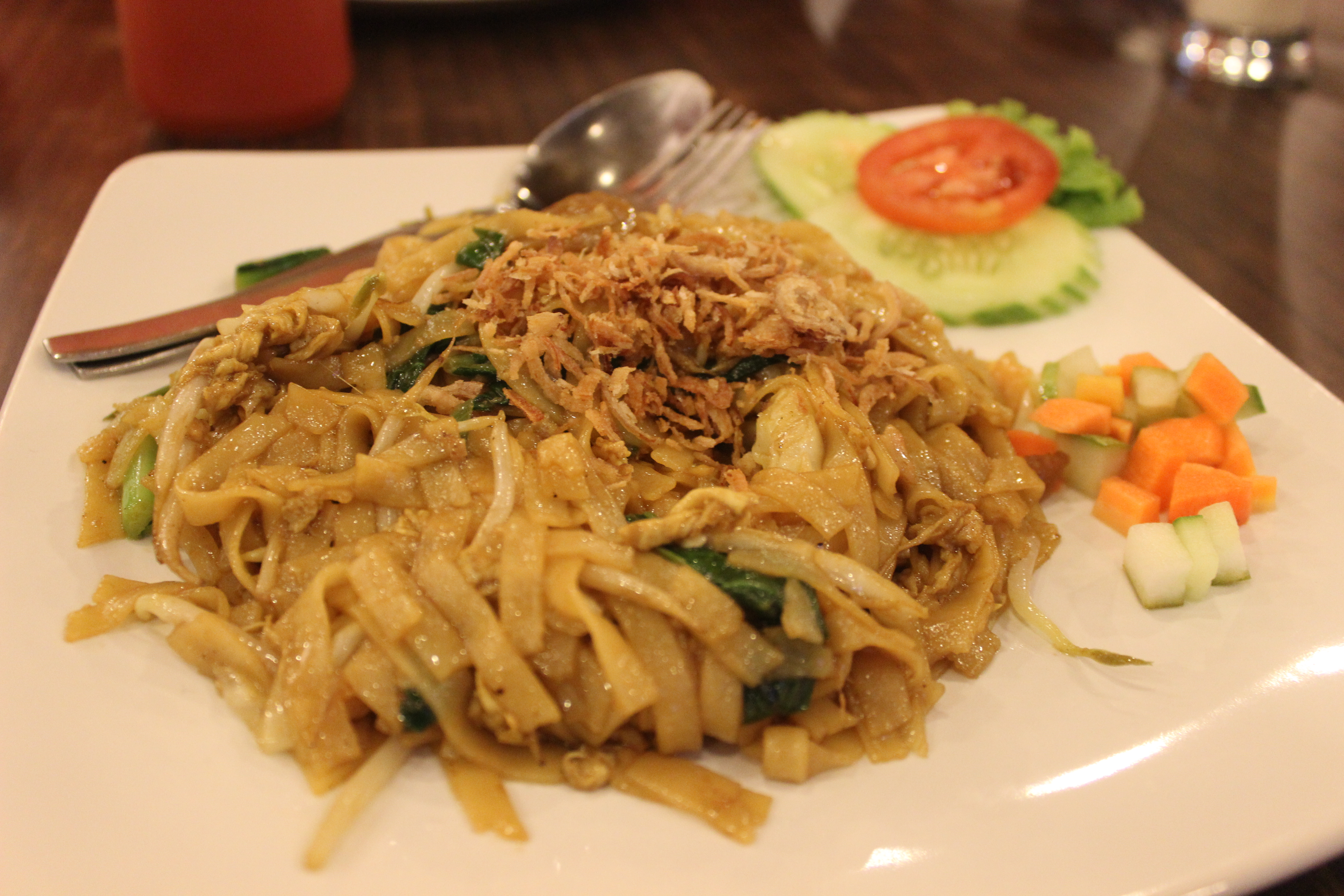
Kwetiau goreng served with acar pickles and fried shallot sprinkles

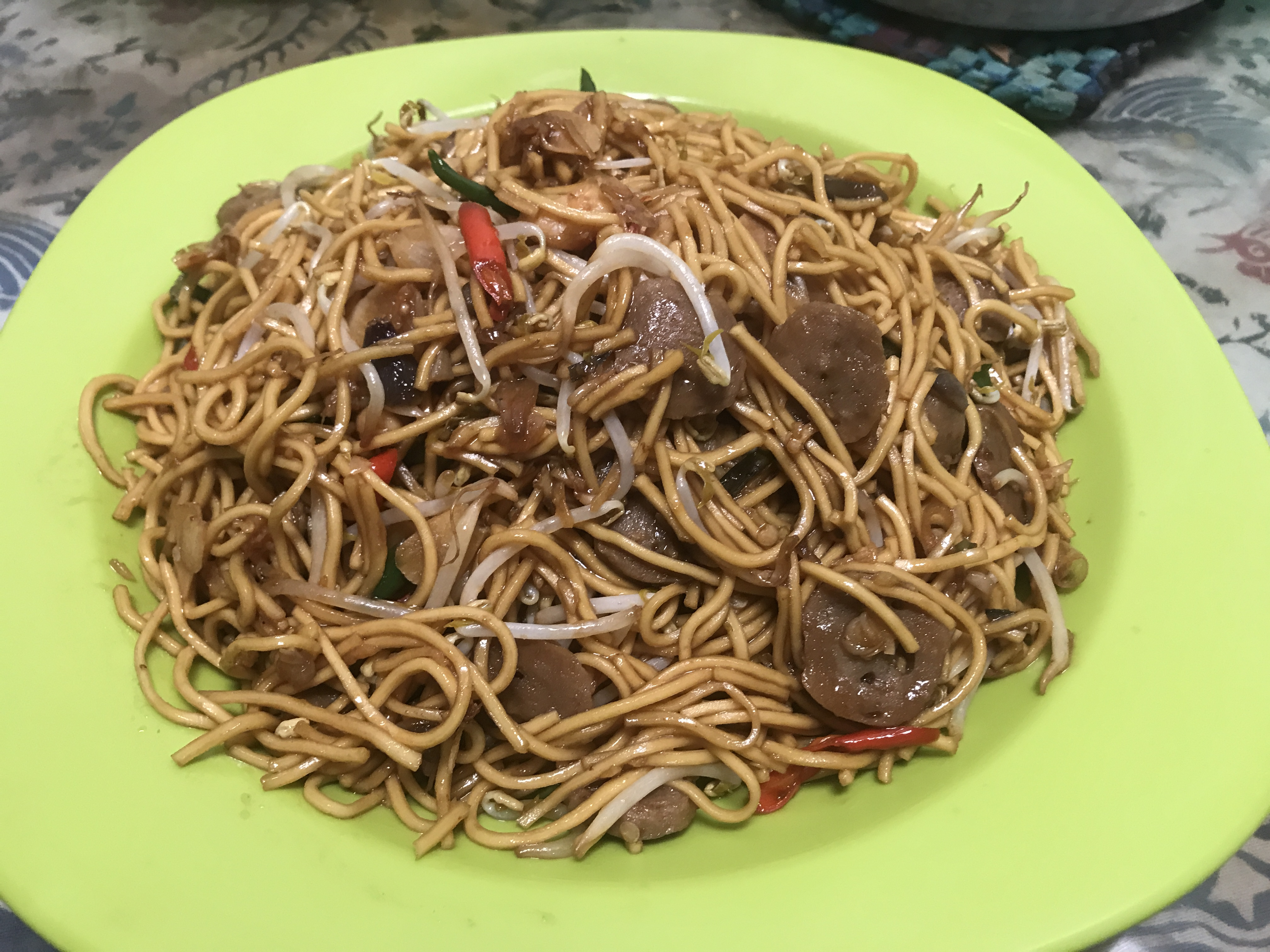
Oseng-oseng mie, Javanese sauteed noodles with slices of chilis

- Bakso – Indonesian meatball dish
- Bakmi – Indonesian noodles with meat
- Banmian – Chinese noodle dish
- Bihun bebek
- Bihun goreng – Southeast Asian fried rice vermicelli dish
- Char kway teow – Southeast Asian rice noodle dish
- Cirambay
- Cwie mie
- I fu mi – Indonesian noodle dish
- Karupuak mie
- Ketupat mie
- Kincipan
- Kwetiau ayam – Indonesian flat rice noodle dish
- Kwetiau goreng – Indonesian flat rice noodle dish
- Kwetiau siram sapi – Southeast Asian flat rice noodle dish
- Laksa – Spicy noodle dish from Southeast Asia
- Lakso – Indonesian spicy noodle dish
- Lomie
- Lontong mie
- Mie aceh – Indonesian curried spicy noodle dish
- Mie ayam – A common Indonesian dish of seasoned yellow wheat noodles topped with diced chicken meat (ayam).
- Mie bakso – Indonesian noodle soup
- Mie balap
- Mie bancir
- Mie bangladesh – Indonesian noodle dish
- Mie belitung
- Mie cakalang – Indonesian skipjack tuna noodle
- Mie caluk – Indonesian noodle dish
- Mie celor – Indonesian noodle soup dish
- Mie combor – Indonesian noodle dish
- Mie eungkot suree
- Mie golosor
- Mie gomak – Indonesian spicy noodle soup dish
- Mie goreng – Indonesian stir-fried noodle dish
- Mie ikan – Indonesian noodle dish
- Mie jawa – Indonesian noodle dish
- Mie juhi – Southeast Asian fruit and vegetable dish
- Mie kacang
- Mie kangkung – Indonesian vegetable noodle soup dish
- Mie kari – Southeast Asian noodle dish
- Mie kepiting Pontianak
- Mie kering – Indonesian dried noodle dish
- Mie kluntung
- Mie koba
- Mie koclok – Indonesian chicken noodle food
- Mie kocok – Indonesian noodle soup
- Mie koples
- Mie kopyok – Indonesian noodle dish
- Mie kuah – Noodle soup
- Mie lendir
- Mie letheg
- Mie lo
- Mie loba
- Mie lung
- Mie ongklok
- Mie pangsit – Cantonese noodle dish
- Mie pecel – Indonesian vegetable dish
- Mie pentil
- Mie rebus – Noodle soup
- Mie sagu
- Mie so
- Mie sop
- Mie tahu
- Mie tarempa – Indonesian noodle dish
- Mie tayel
- Mie toprak
- Miedal – Indonesian porridge dish
- Miedes
- Misoa – Type of Chinese wheat noodles
- Oseng-oseng mie
- Oseng-oseng soun
- Pantiaw
- Rujak mie Palembang – Southeast Asian fruit and vegetable dish
- Sapo mie
- Sop mie asin
- Soto ayam – A traditional Indonesian dish that uses ingredients such as chicken, lontong, noodles, and rice vermicelli.
- Soto mi – Indonesian noodle soup dish
- Tekwan – Indonesian fish soup dish
- Tempe alakatak

=== Laotian ===
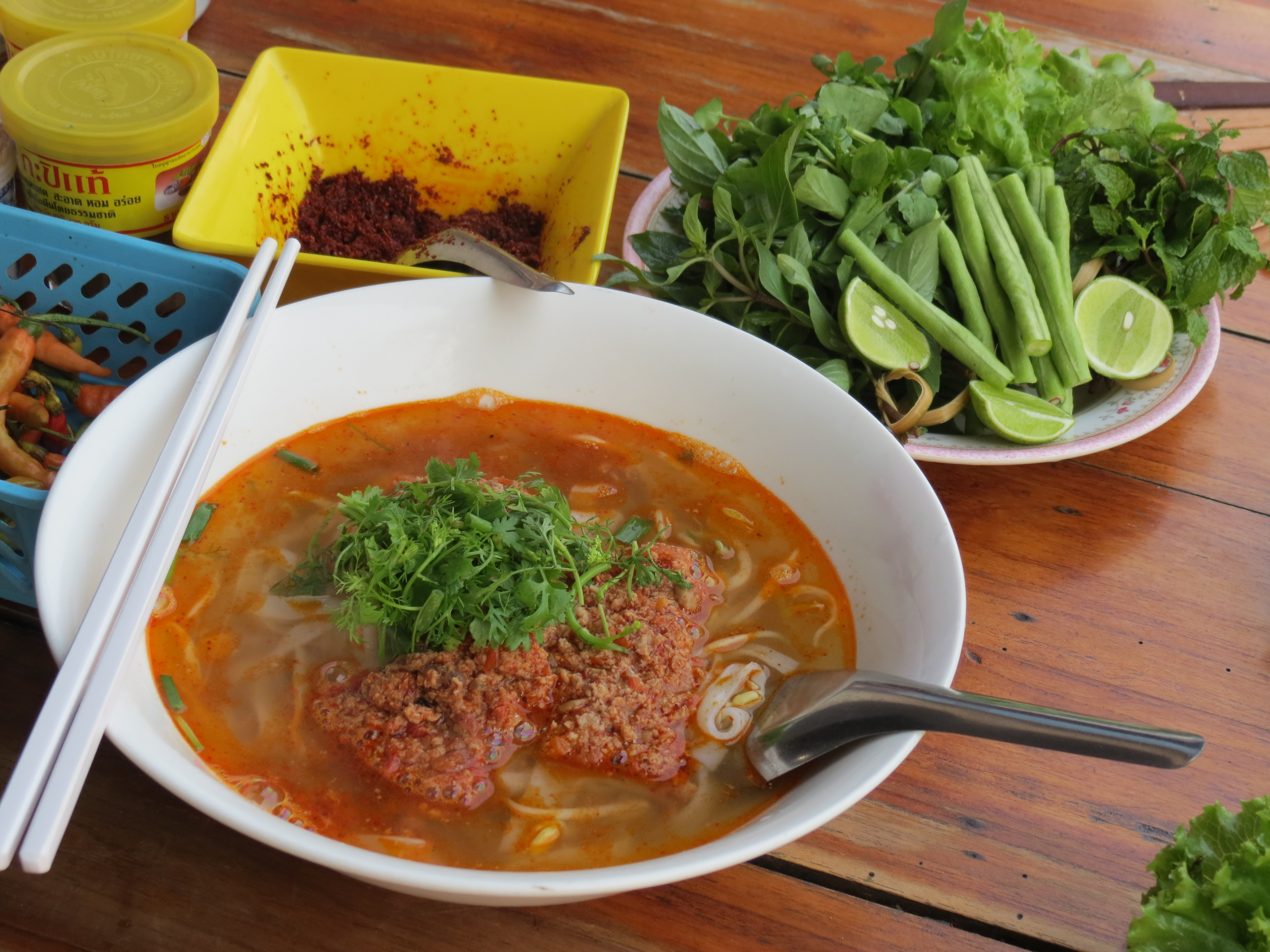
Lao-style khao soi, in Luang Prabang

- Khao poon - Lao rice vermicelli soup
- Lao Khao soi - Hand-sliced noodle soup popular in northern Laos
- Feu (food) - Laotian-style Vietnamese Pho soup
- Lard na - Lao-Chinese stir-fried wide rice noodle covered with gravy
- Khao piak sen - Lao wet rice noodle soup in chicken or pork broth

=== Malaysian ===
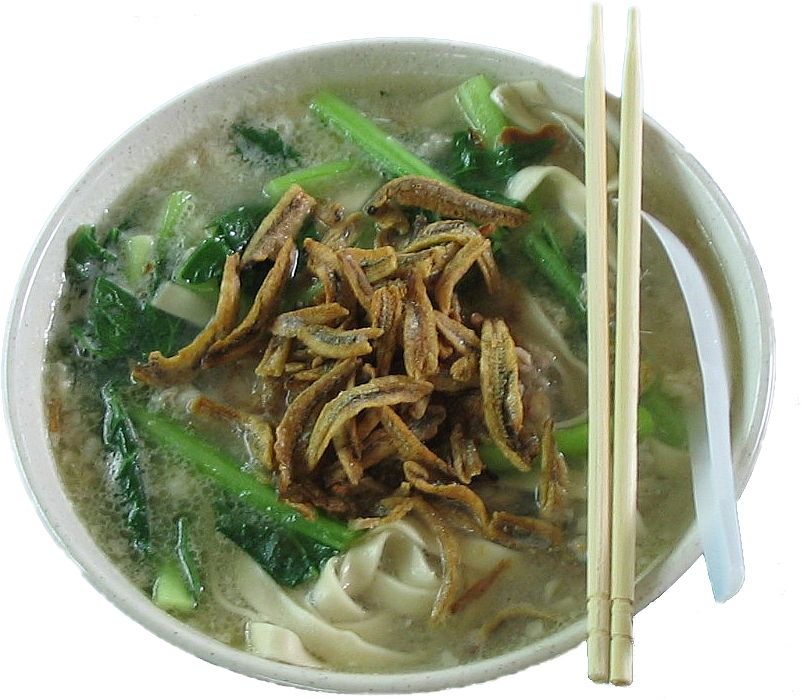
Banmian

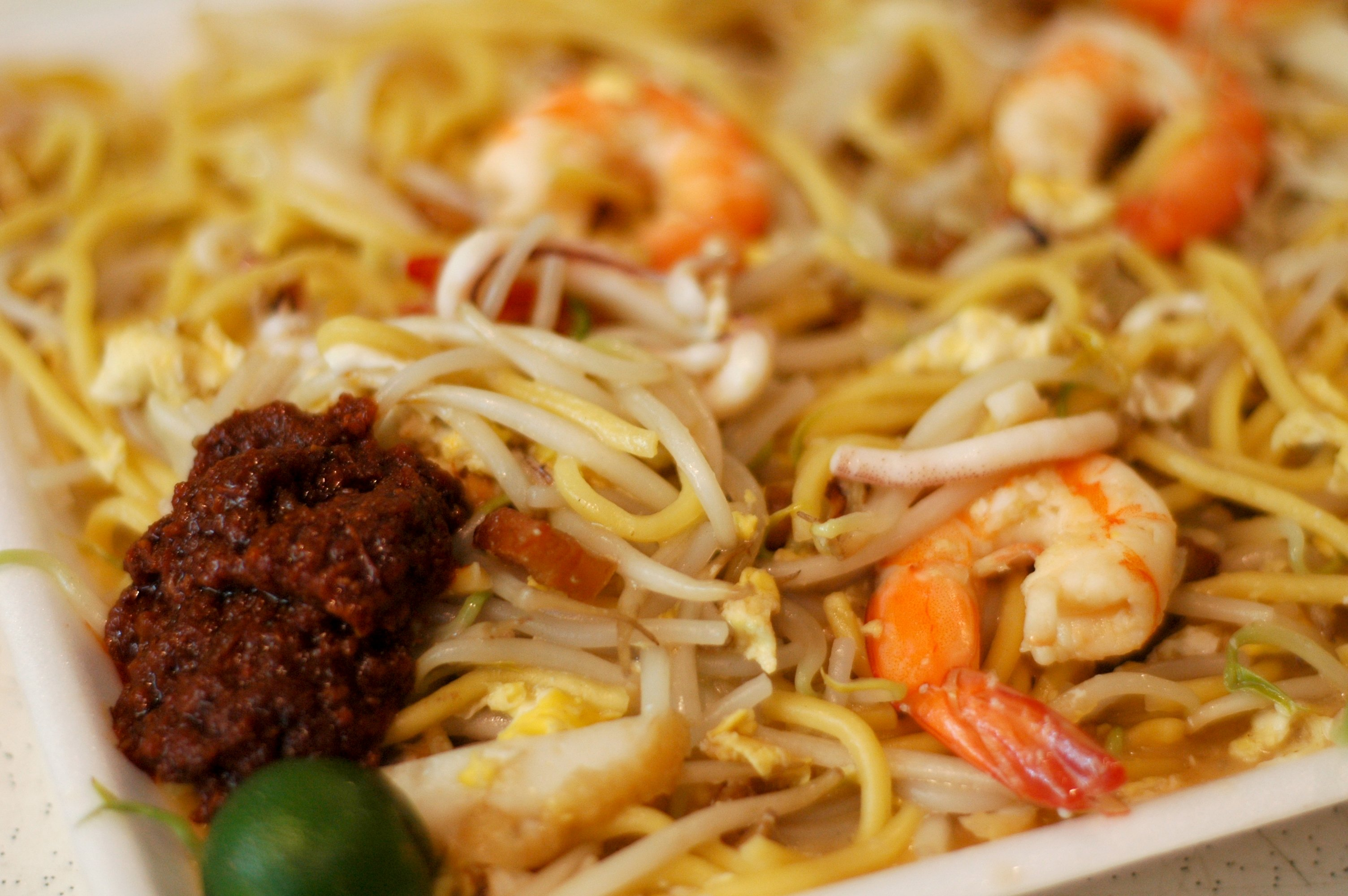
Hokkien mee

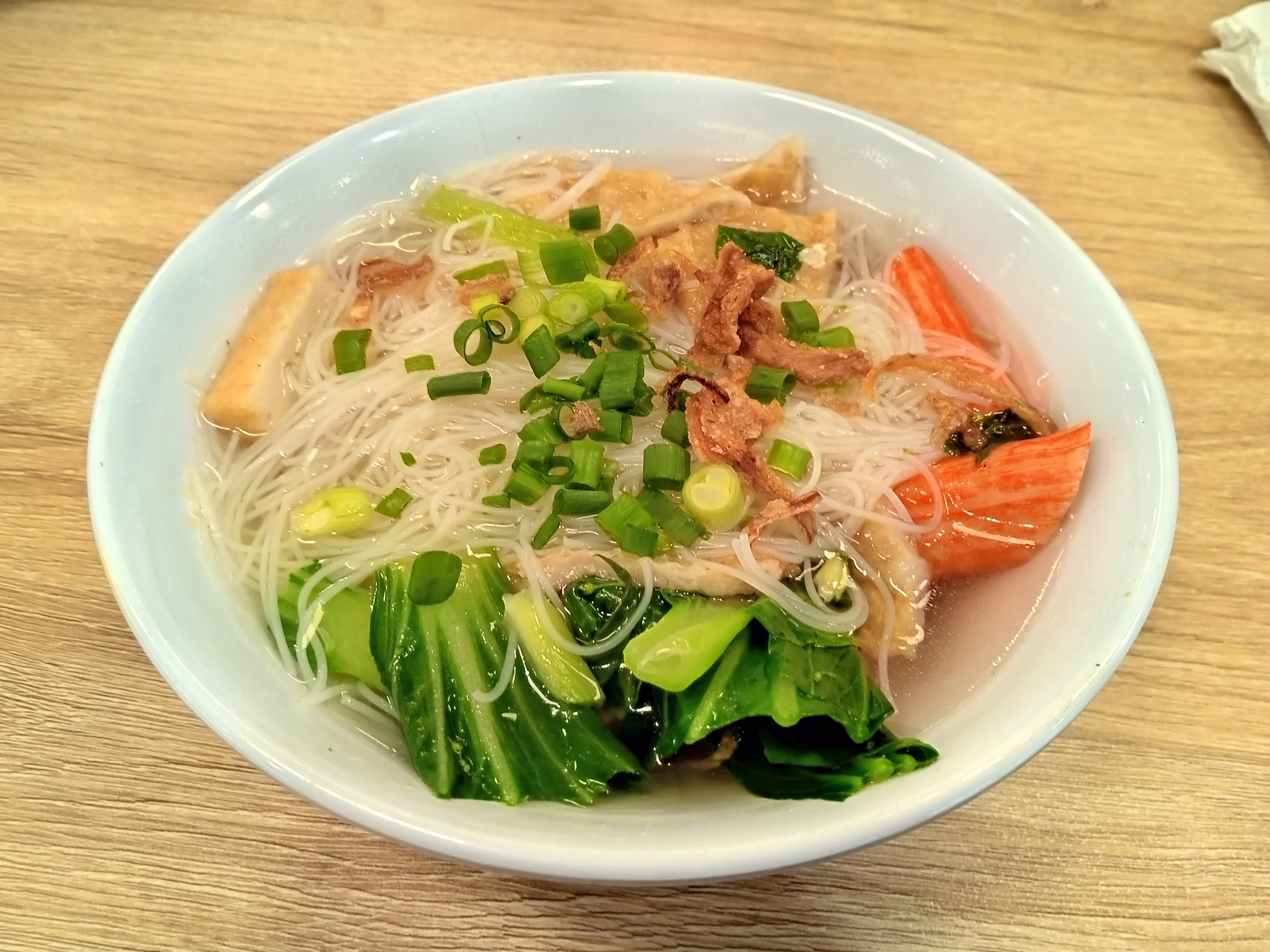
Bihun sup

- Banmian – Chinese noodle dish
- Beaufort mee – Egg noodle dish with chicken from Sabah, Malaysia
- Bihun sup
- Char kway teow – Southeast Asian rice noodle dish
- Curry Mee – Southeast Asian noodle dish
- Duck soup noodles – Type of food
- Hae mee – Southeast Asian noodle dish
- Hokkien mee – Southeast Asian noodle dish
- Laksa – Spicy noodle dish from Southeast Asia
- Lor mee – Hokkien noodle dish from Zhangzhou, China
- Maggi goreng – A variation of Mamak-style mee goreng, using Maggi brand of instant noodles, prepared with hot water before stir-frying, instead of fresh yellow noodle.
- Mee bandung or Mee Bandung Muar - Malaysian shrimp and beef flavoured noodle soup
- Mee goreng
- Kolo mee – Dry noodle dish from Sarawak, Malaysia
- Mee pok – Chinese noodle dish
- Mee rebus – Noodle soup
- Mee siam – Southeast Asian noodle dish
- Mee sotong – Malaysian noodle with squid.
- Mee tauhu – Noodle dish from Sabah, Malaysia
- Mee udang – Malaysian prawn noodles.
- Ngiu chap – Beef mixed noodle soup dish from Sabah, Malaysia
- Rice noodle roll – Cantonese rice dish
- Sang nyuk mee – Pork noodle dish from Sabah, Malaysia
- Tuaran mee – Egg noodle dish from Sabah, Malaysia

=== Singaporean ===
- Banmian – Chinese noodle dish
- Char kway teow – Southeast Asian rice noodle dish
- Curry chicken noodles – Singaporean noodle dish
- Hae mee – Southeast Asian noodle dish
- Hokkien mee – Southeast Asian noodle dish
- Katong Laksa – Singaporean noodle dish
- Mee pok – Chinese noodle dish
- Mee siam – Southeast Asian noodle dish
- Mee Soto – Indonesian noodle soup dish
- Mie goreng – Indonesian stir-fried noodle dish
- Mi rebus – Noodle soup
- Satay bee hoon – Singaporean satay dish
- Singapore-style noodles – A dish of stir-fried cooked rice vermicelli, curry powder, vegetables, scrambled eggs and meat, most commonly chicken, beef, char siu pork, or prawns, yellow in colour.
- Vegetarian bee hoon – Singaporean noodle dish
- Wonton noodles – Cantonese noodle dish

=== Thai ===
- Boat noodles – Thai noodle dish
- Drunken noodles – Thai dish
- Khao soi – Thai noodle soup
- Mi krop – Thai dish
- Nam ngiao – Food
- Pad see ew – Stir-fried noodle dish from Thailand
- Pad thai – Stir-fried noodle dish from Thailand
- Rat na – Thai-Chinese noodle dish
- Sukhothai rice noodles – A style of rice noodle soup (kuai tiao)

=== Vietnamese ===
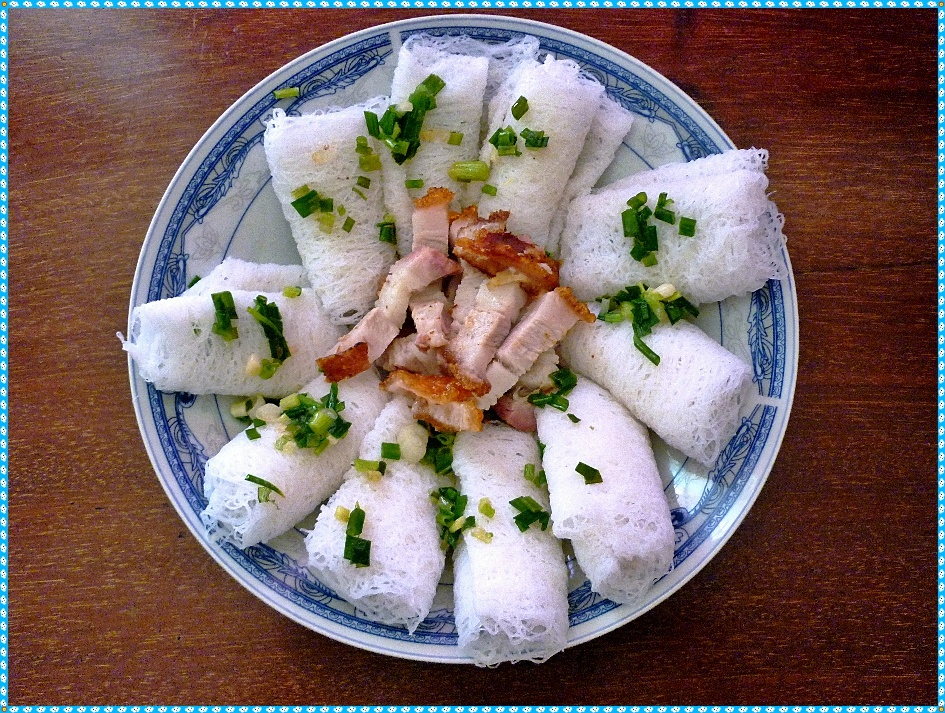
Bánh hỏi

== Central Asia ==
- Beshbarmak – A dish from Central Asian cuisine, usually made from finely chopped boiled meat with noodles and often served with chyk, an onion sauce.
- Laghman – A Central Asian dish of pulled noodles, meat and vegetables.

=== Kyrgyz ===
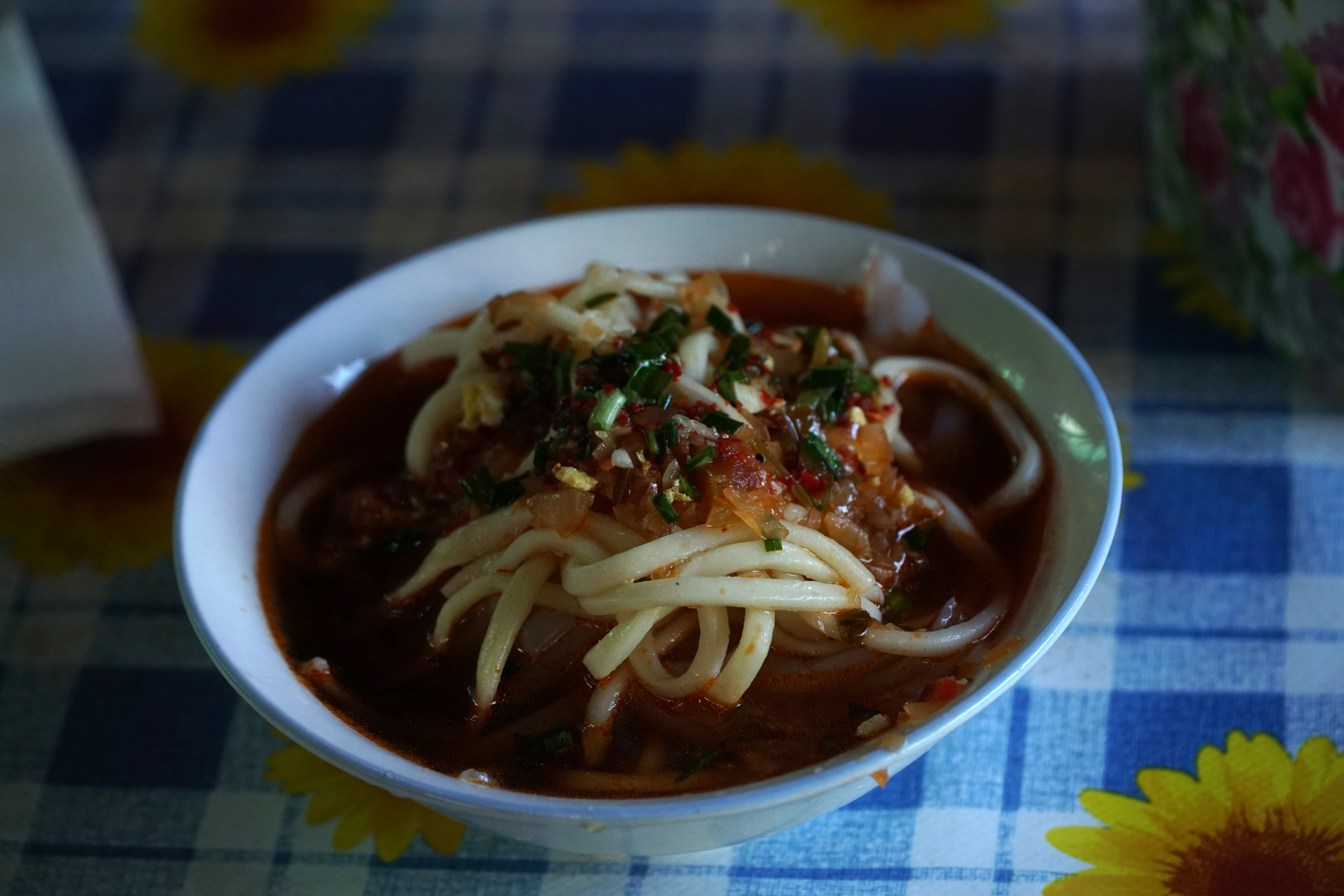
Ashlan-fu in Karakol

- Ashlan-fu – Karakol cold noodles.

=== Uzbek ===
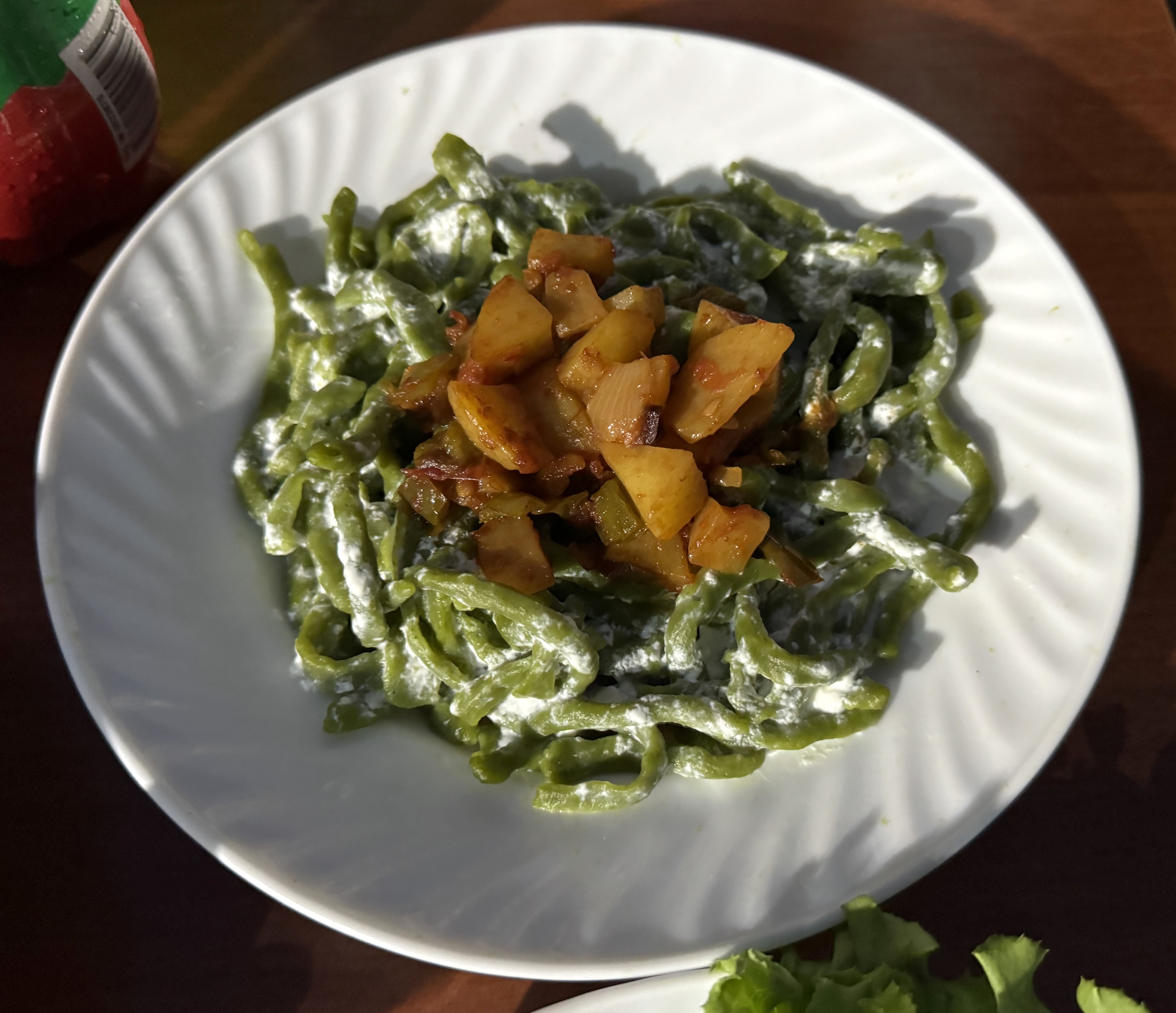
Shivit oshi

- Laghman – Uyghur noodle dish
- Naryn – Central Asian meat and noodle dish
- Shivit oshi – Khiva green noodle dish.

== South Asia ==
=== Bhutanese ===
- Bagthuk – rich potato soup with wholemeal hand-cut noodles
- Jangbuli – whole-wheat pasta served with curd and chives

=== Nepalese ===
- Laping – Tibetan noodle dish
- Thukpa – Tibetan noodle soup

=== India ===
- Idiyappam – Rice noodle dish
- Sevai – Indian rice noodle

== Middle East ==
=== Jewish ===
- Makarouneh - Traditional dish of Syrian Jews, Lebanese Jews and Old Yishuv Jews. Consists of macaroni, chicken, potatoes and spices. Traditionally Macaroni Hamin is slow-cooked overnight before Shabbat. Similar to other dishes prepared in communities of Jewish Sephardic and Iraqi origin haminados eggs can be added. Still a common dish in Israel.

=== Iranian ===
- Ash reshteh – A type of aush (Iranian thick soup) featuring reshteh (thin noodles) and kashk (a dairy product, made from cooked or dried yogurt), commonly made in Iran and Azerbaijan.
- Faloodeh – Traditional Iranian cold dessert

=== Palestinian ===
- Rqaq w Adas – Palestinian noodle with lentils.

=== Syrian ===
- Harak osbao - Noodles with lentils, noodles, and tamarind.

=== Turkish ===
- Cevizli erişte – Turkish walnut pasta.

== Pan-American ==
=== United States ===
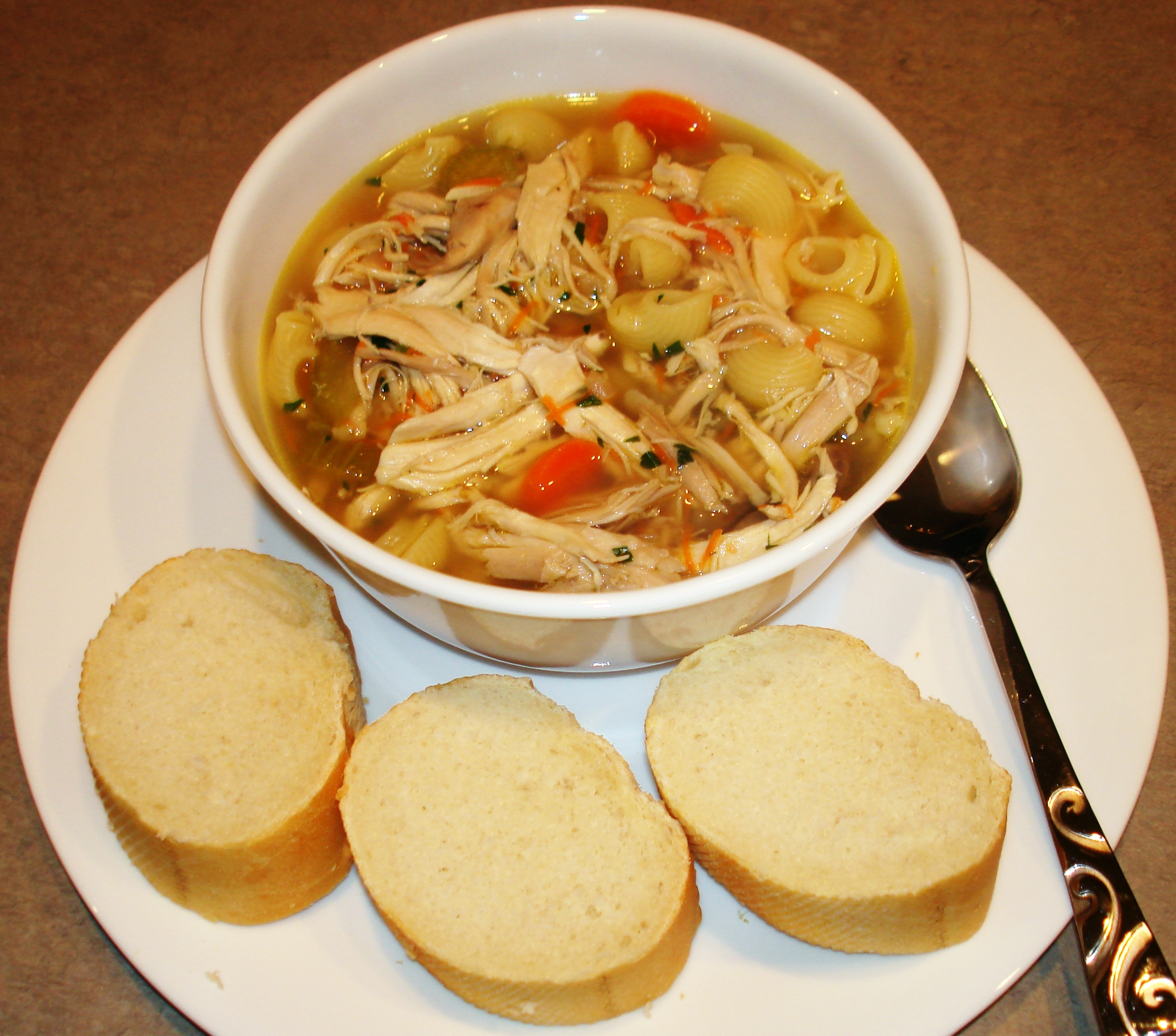
Chicken noodle soup, with bread

- Chicken noodle soup – Soup made from chicken
- Chicken riggies – American pasta dish
- Kraft Dinner – Boxed macaroni and cheese mix

=== Chinese-American ===
- Chow mein sandwich – typically consists of a brown gravy-based chow mein mixture placed between halves of a hamburger-style bun, and is popular on Chinese-American restaurant menus throughout southeastern Massachusetts and parts of neighboring Rhode Island
- Yaka mein – A type of beef noodle soup found in many Creole restaurants in New Orleans; also a type of Chinese wheat noodle.

=== Hawaii ===
- Saimin – Hawaiian noodle dish

=== Mexican ===
- Sopa de fideo – Type of stock-based noodle soup

=== Peruvian ===
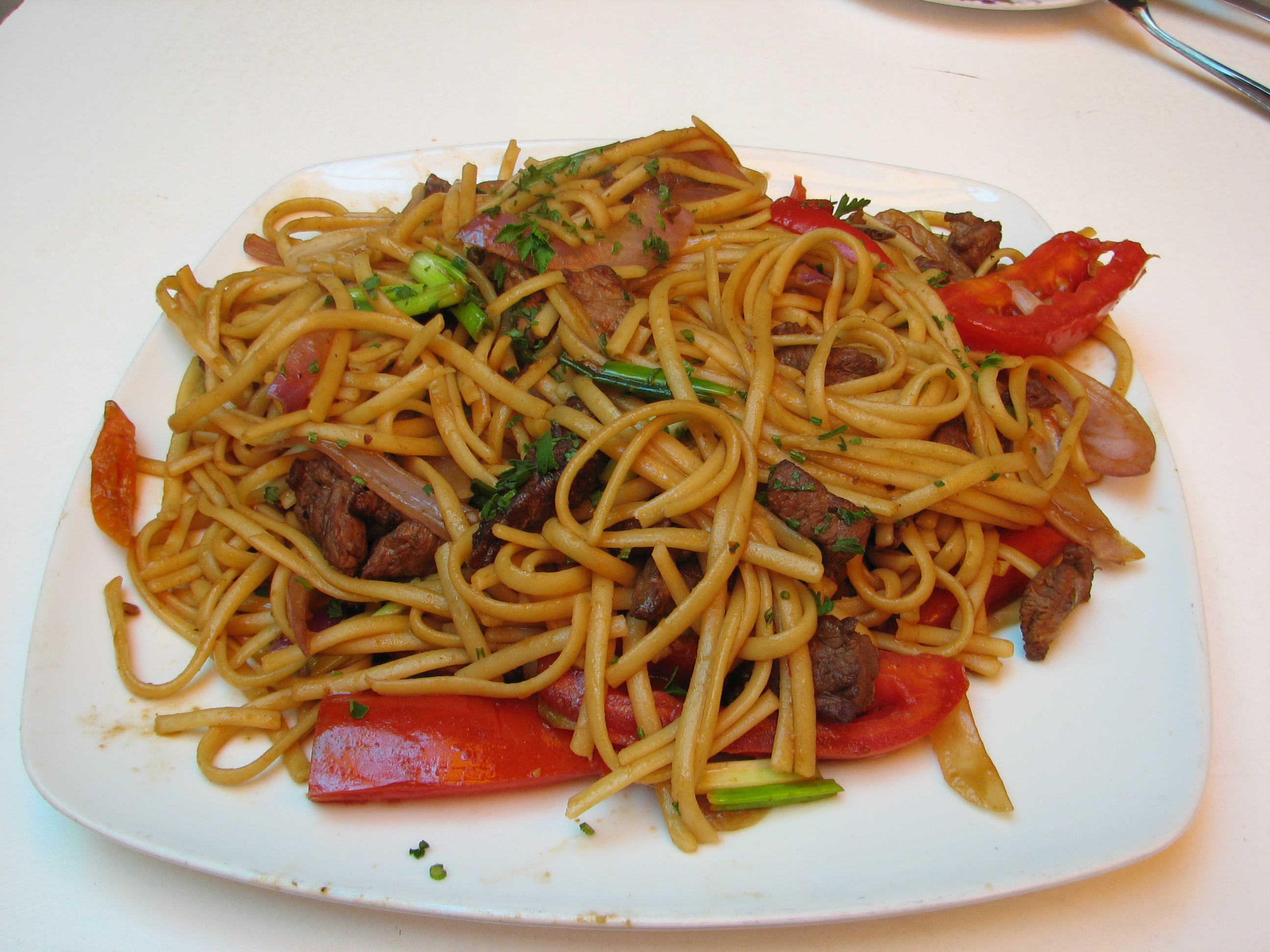
Tallarín saltado, part of chifa fusion cuisine in Peru

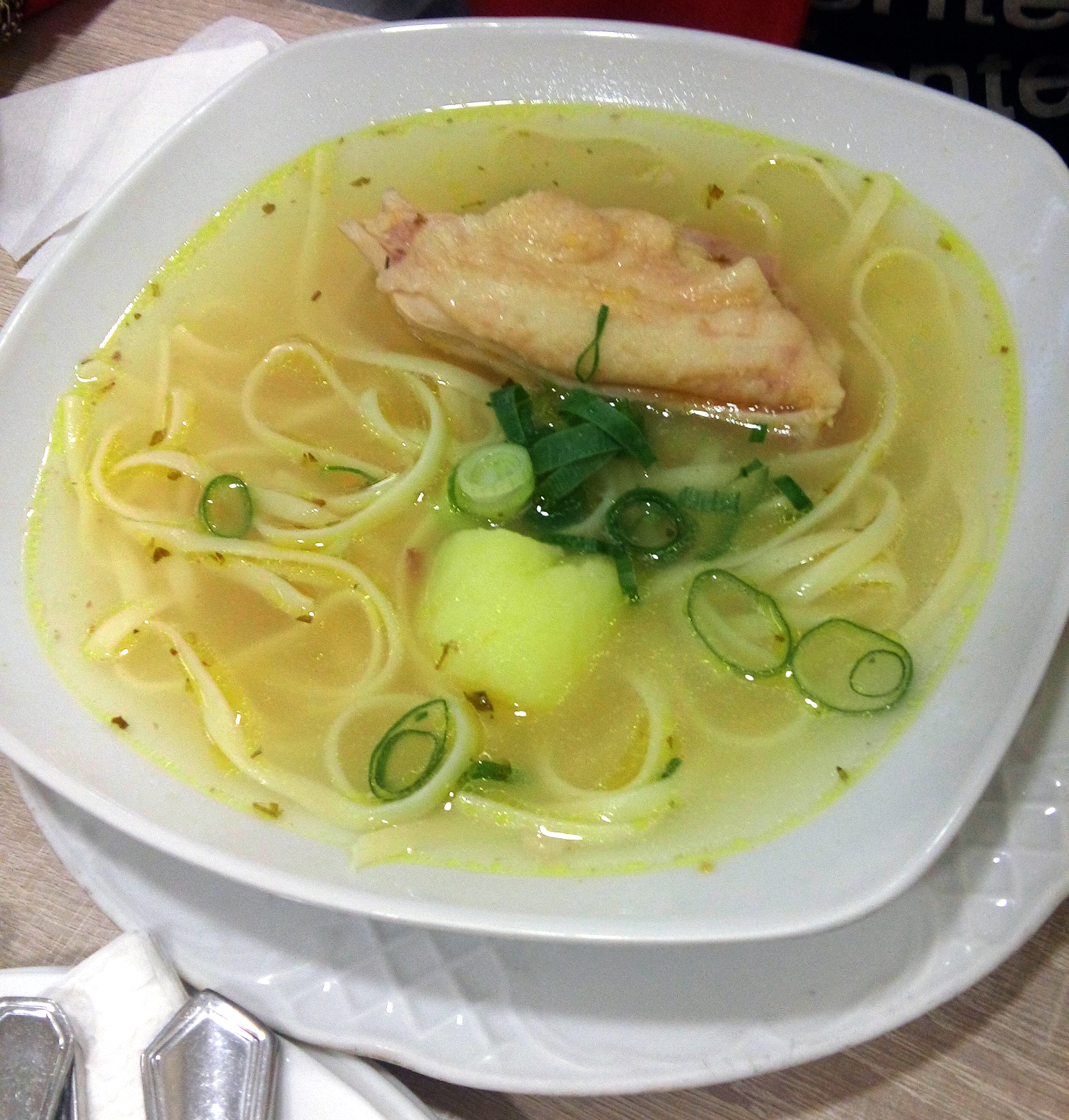
Caldo de gallina, Peru

- Aeropuerto - Combination of arroz chaufa and tallarín saltado.
- Caldo de gallina - Peruvian soup with potatoes, egg noodles and whole pieces of chicken or hen.
- Sopa de fideos - Peruvian noodle soup, usually served with chicken, potatoes, small pieces of carrot and cabello de ángel noodles.
- Sopa a la minuta - Peruvian soup with meat, milk, eggs and cabello de ángel noodles.
- Sopa seca - Tallarín verde served with carapulcra.
- Tallarín rojo - Peruvian spaghetti bolognese with chicken and tomato, garlic and carrot sauce.
- Tallarín saltado - Peruvian stir-fried noodle.
- Tallarín saltado criollo - Peruvian stir-fried noodle with more Peruvian style.
- Tallarines verdes - Peruvian green spaghetti usually served with steak or breaded steak.

== Europe ==
=== Croatian ===
- Rezanci na žufi

=== German ===
- Käsespätzle – Baked cheese pasta dish

=== Jewish ===
- Kugel - A casserole in Jewish cuisine made of lokshen.

=== Polish ===
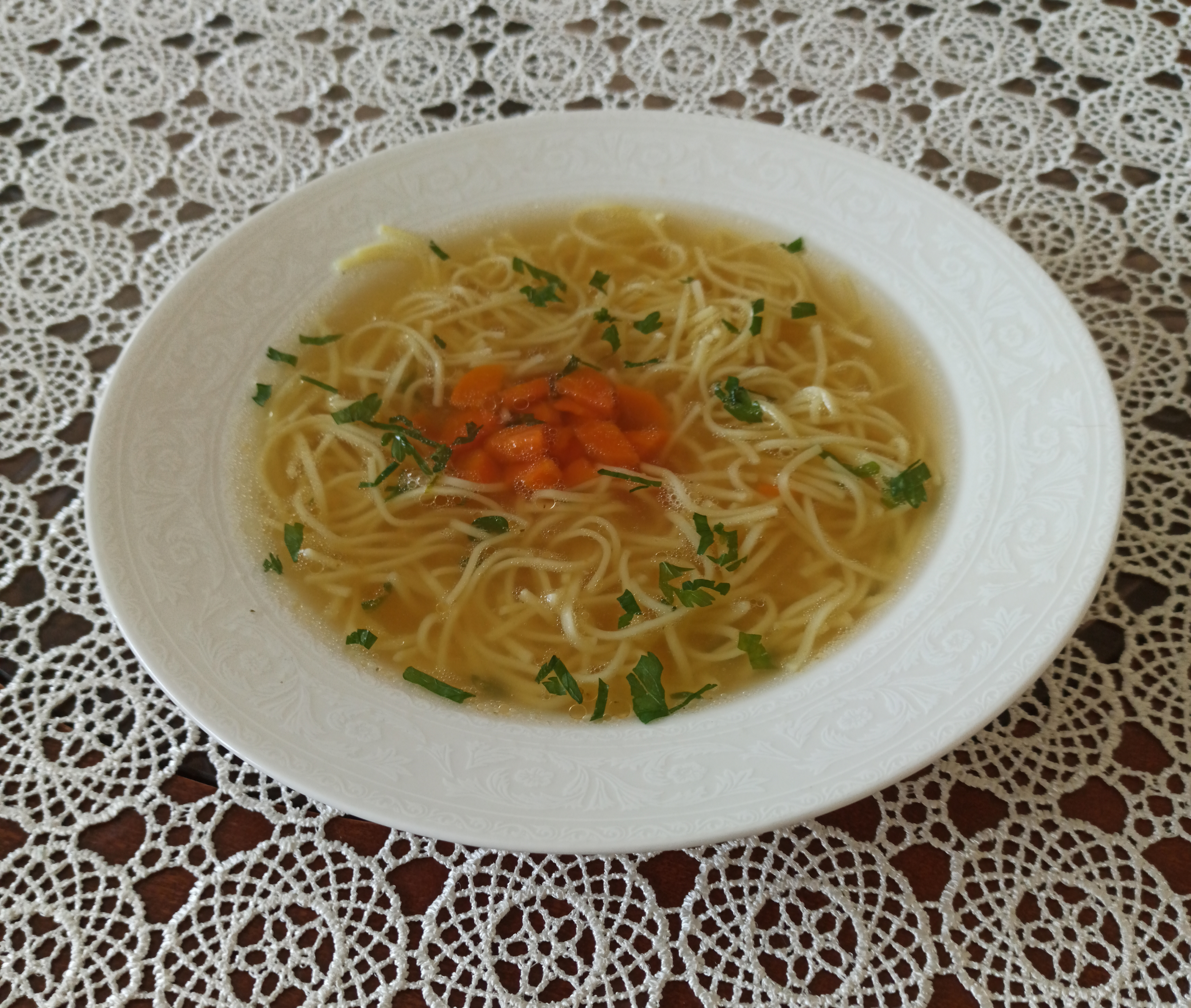
Rosół

- Rosół – Traditional Polish meat soup

=== Romanian ===
- Supă (de pui) cu tăiței

=== Russian ===
- Şulpa

=== Spanish ===
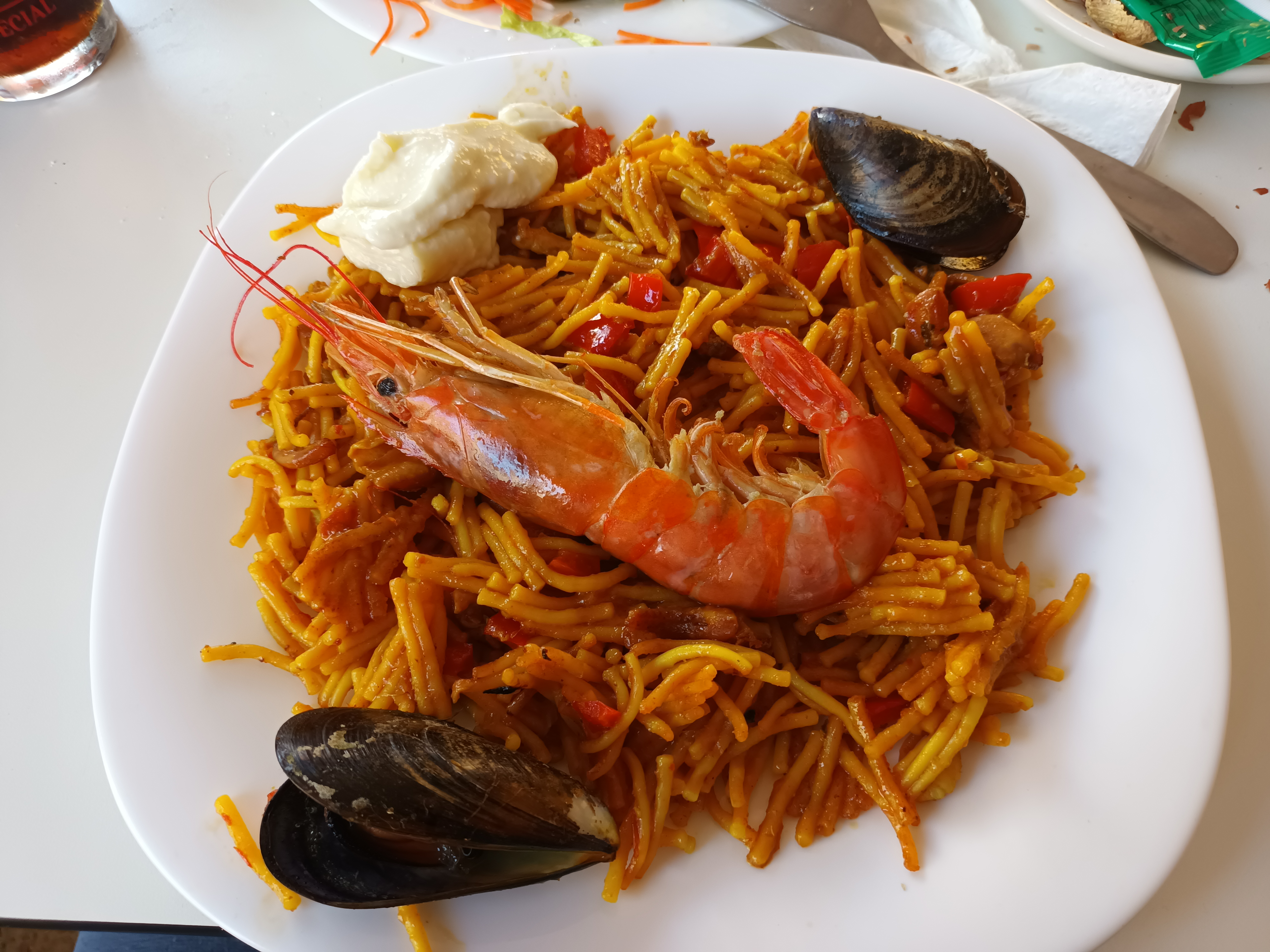
Fideuà in Gandia

- Fideuà – Seafood dish from Valencia, Spain
- Sopa de fideo – Type of stock-based noodle soup

== Africa ==
=== Algerian ===
- Rechta – Algerian dish

=== Egyptian ===
- Koshary – National dish of Egypt

=== Libyan ===
- Makaruna imbaukha

=== Nigerian ===
- Asun pasta

=== Somali ===
- Baasto iyo suugo

== Gallery ==
More noodle dishes

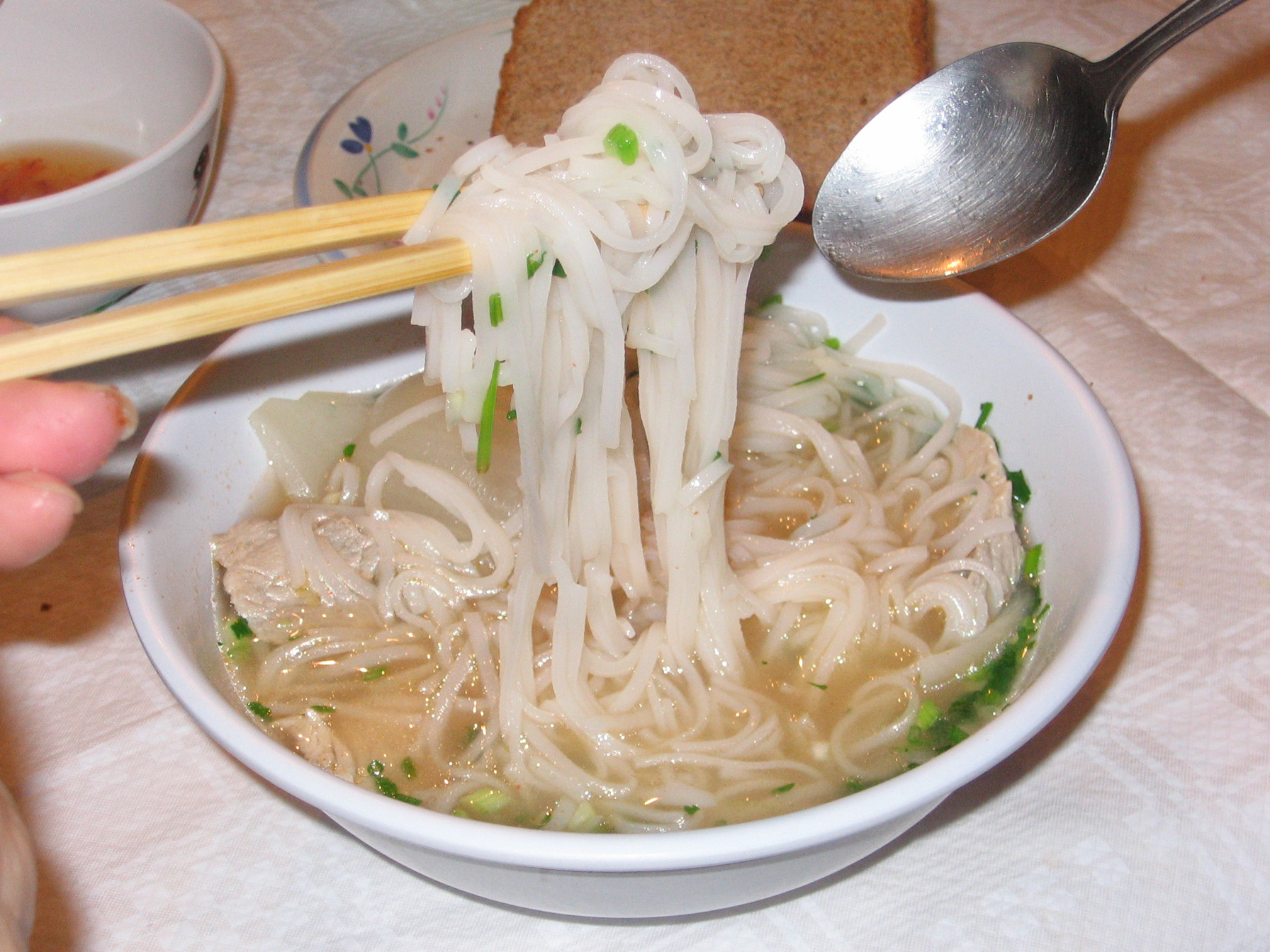
A simple pho dish

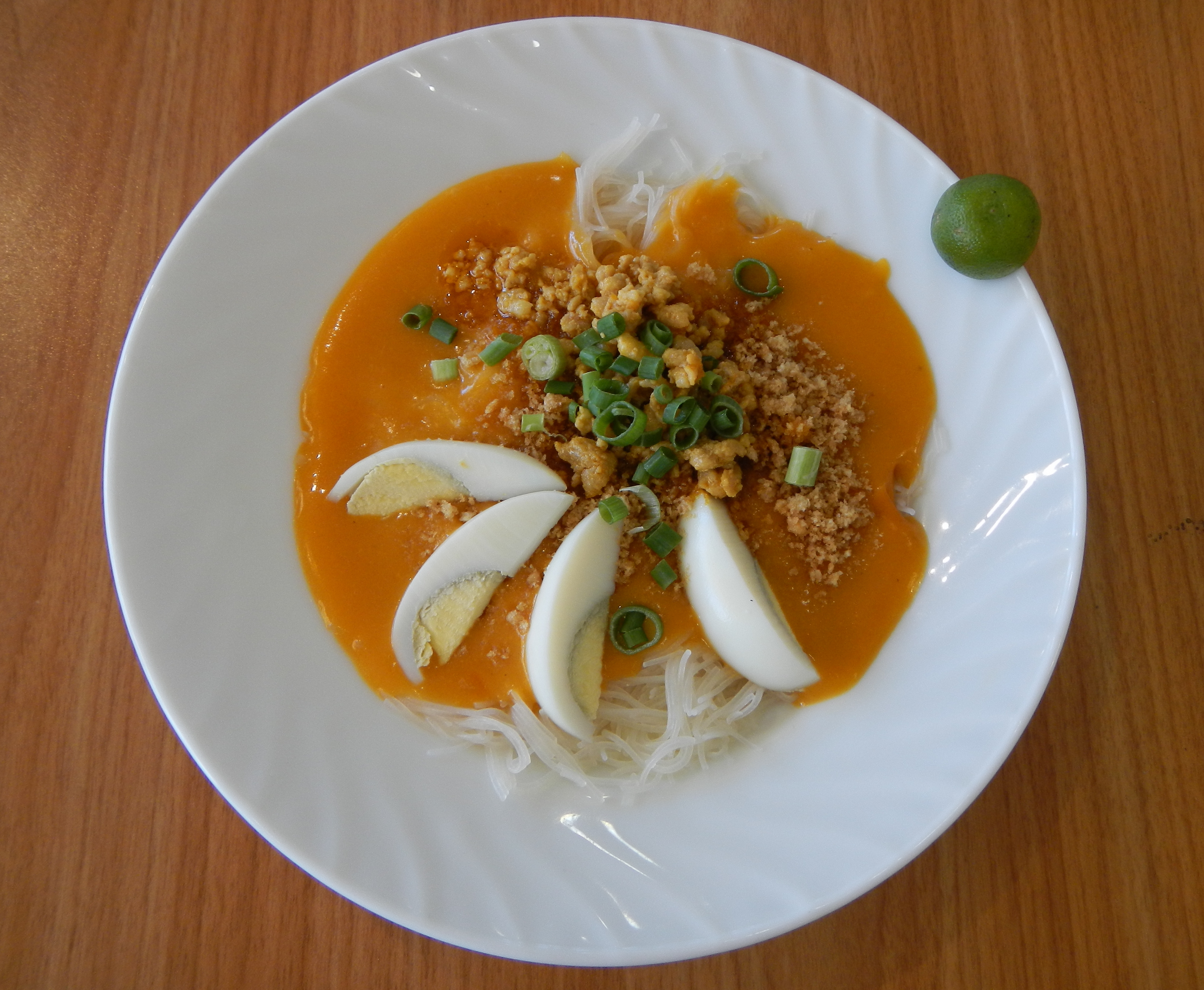
Pancit palabok

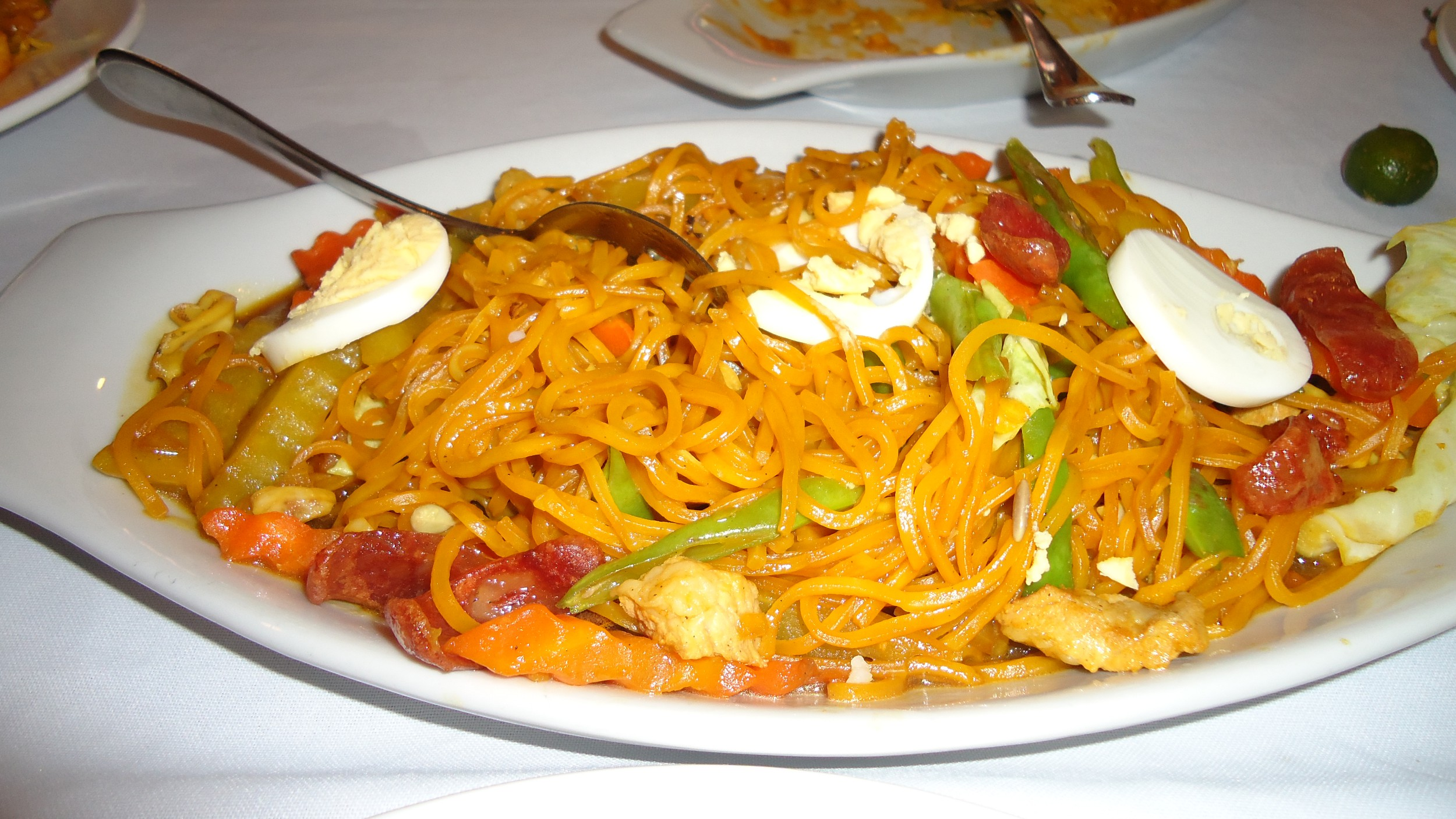
Pancit luglug

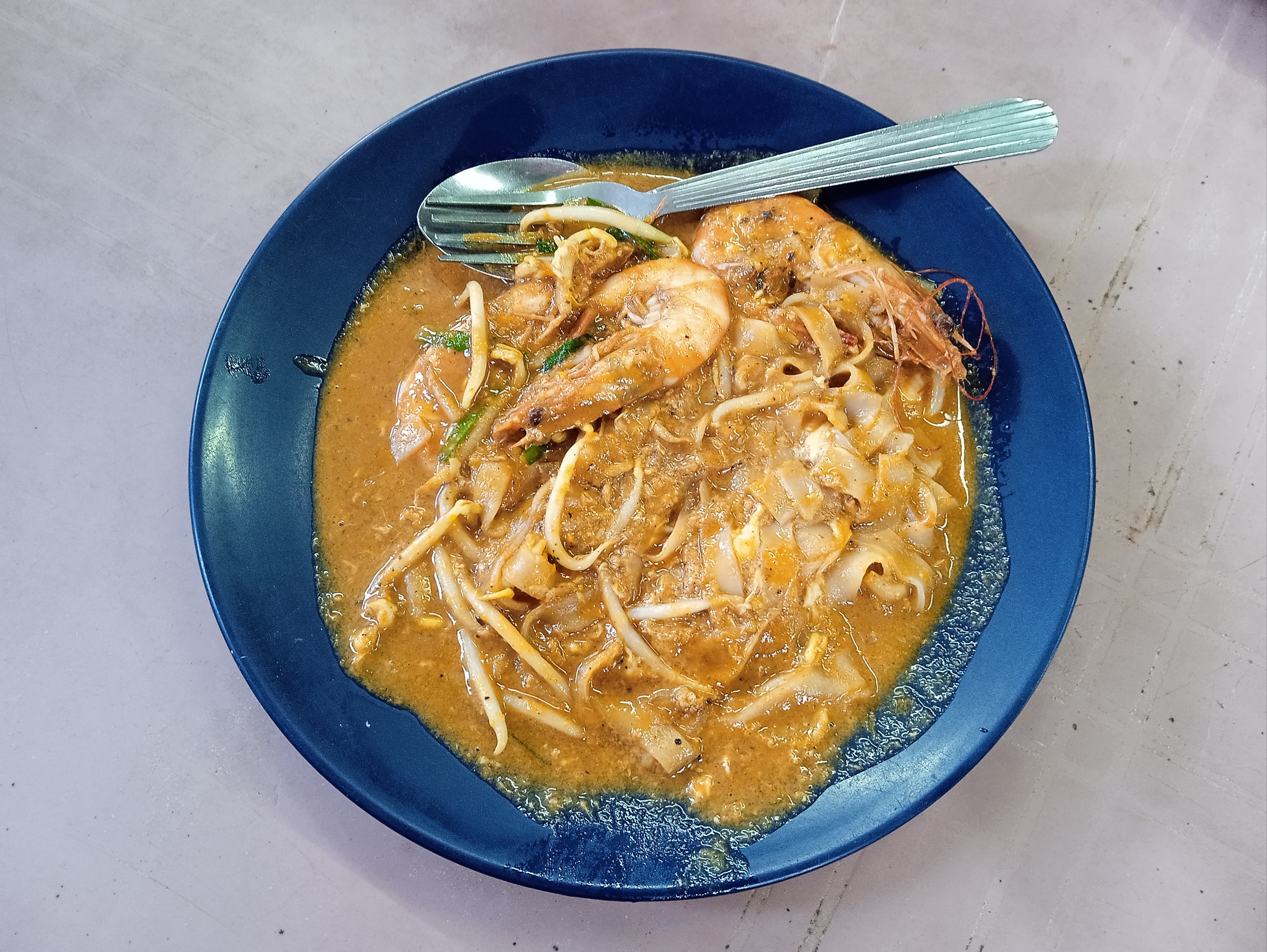
Char kway teow

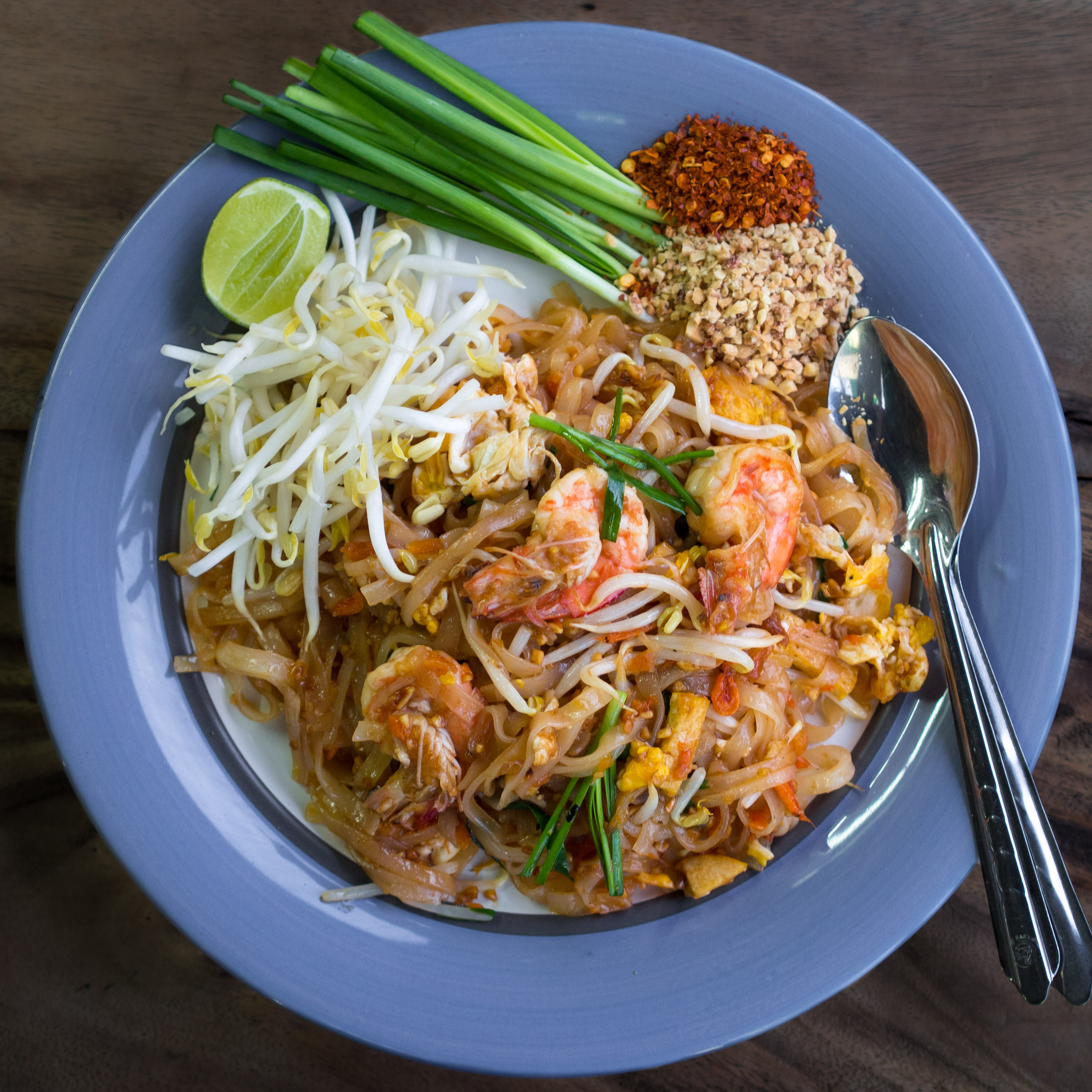
Pad Thai from a street stall in Chiang Mai

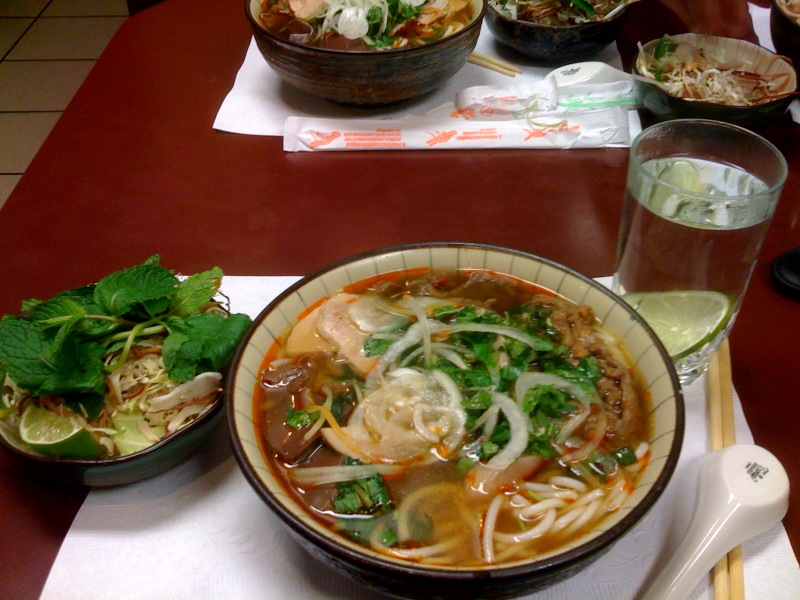
Bún bò Huế

== See also ==
- List of fried noodle dishes
- List of noodles
  - List of instant noodle brands
  - List of noodle restaurants
- List of ramen dishes
- List of pasta
- List of pasta dishes
