= Mie kopyok =

Indonesian noodle dish

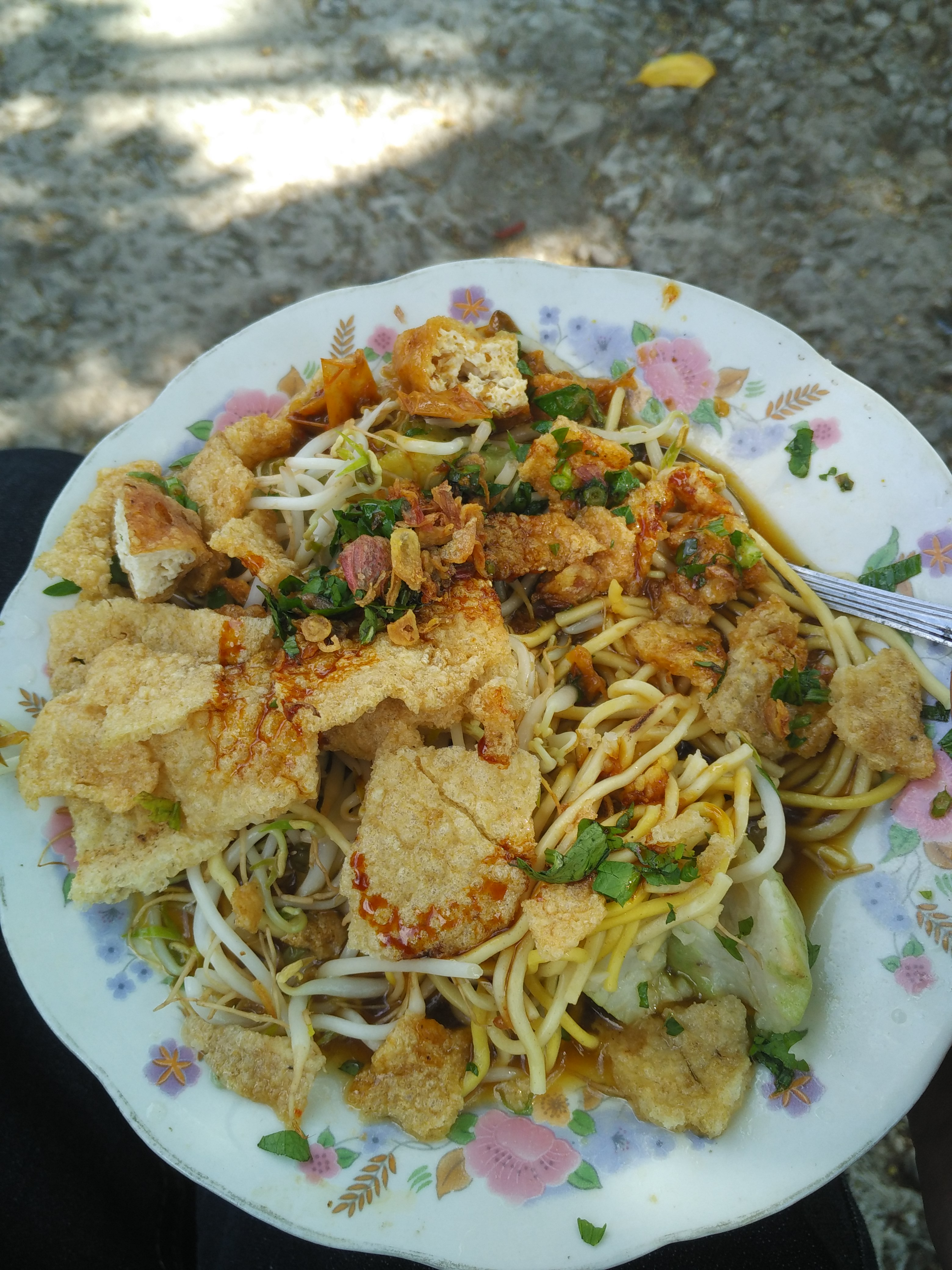
- Mie kopyok in Semarang
- Alternative names: Mi kopyok
- Type: Noodle soup
- Course: Main
- Place of origin: Indonesia
- Region or state: Semarang, Central Java
- Serving temperature: Hot
- Main ingredients: Bean sprout, noodle, lontong, fried tofu

Mie kopyok (lit. 'shaken noodle'), is an Indonesian noodle soup, a specialty of Semarang City, Central Java. The dish consists of noodles served in garlic soup, slices of fried tofu, lontong, bean sprouts, and crushed crackers, sprinkled with sliced fresh celery, and fried shallot. It is served with kecap manis on top. Mie kopyok was mostly peddled with pushed food carts from one sub-district to another, but now, it can be found in the downtown of Semarang with a permanent building.

== Other version ==
There are other versions of mie kopyok in some regions:

1. In southern Central Java, precisely in Yogyakarta and Klaten, there is also a food called mie kopyok with different ingredients namely beef broth, sliced beef or ceker (chicken feet), and cabbage.
2. In Jember, East Java, mie kopyok uses different food ingredients such as petis (black colored shrimp paste sauce), mustard leaves, and pentol (meatballs).

== See also ==
- Mie koclok
- Mie kocok
- List of noodle dishes
- Noodle soup
