= Mie combor =

Indonesian noodle dish

- Alternative names: Mi combor
- Type: Noodle soup
- Course: Main
- Place of origin: Indonesia
- Region or state: Probolinggo, East Java
- Serving temperature: Hot
- Main ingredients: Bean sprout, noodle, salted duck egg

Mie combor is a noodle soup from Kraksaan district in Probolinggo. The word combor is Javanese, which means in abundant gravy. Noodles, bean sprouts, free-range chicken, and a salted duck egg are all ingredients in the noodle soup.

== Other version ==
There is another version of mie combor in Kediri specifically in the Gampengrejo district. The ingredients are flat noodles like tagliatelle pasta, shredded chicken, meatball, hot sauce, sambal, sweet soy sauce, and doused with broth

- List of noodle dishes
- Noodle soup
