= Tendon as food =

Part used as ingredient in some Asian cuisines

The tendons of certain animals (particularly beef tendon) are used as an ingredient in some Asian cuisines, including the Filipino, Chinese, Japanese, Korean, Indonesian, Thai, Laotian, Cambodian and Vietnamese. Tendon is tough and fibrous, but becomes soft after a long period of cooking. In some cases it may be boiled for as long as eight hours, while in other dishes it is prepared by deep frying. It contains large amounts of collagen, and after boiling or stewing, it is sometimes described as mimicking the mouthfeel of high-fat cuts of beef despite its low fat content. One author described the taste of deep-fried tendon as being similar to chicharrón (fried pork belly).

== Culinary uses ==
=== China ===
One popular Chinese dish is suànbào niújīn (蒜爆牛筋), where the tendon is marinated in garlic; it is often served at dim sum restaurants.

=== Indonesia ===
In Indonesian cuisine, bakso urat is beef meatball filled with pieces of tendon, while soto kaki is spicy cow's trotters soup which includes cow's leg tendons. Another dish is mie kocok which is a noodle dish with meatballs, beansprouts and pieces of beef tendon.

=== Italy ===
Insalata di nervetti is a Lombard dish made of meat, cartilage and tendons.

=== Japan ===
In Japanese cuisine, beef tendon (gyū-suji) is a common ingredient in oden.

=== Korea ===
In Korean cuisine, beef tendon is known as soesim (쇠심) and is eaten raw as hoe, or stir-fried as namul; however, it is not very common. The most common way to eat beef tendon in Korea is steaming it with high pressure to serve it soft. The steamed beef tendons are eaten with green onions and soy sauce or sometimes served in ox bone soup.

=== Philippines ===
Known as litid in Philippine cuisine, tendon is typically served after boiling for hours into a sticky gelatinous consistency, such as in bulalo and some preparations of pares.

=== Thailand ===
In Thai cuisine, tendon (เอ็น) is often added to noodle soup such as Guay tiew nuea toon.

=== Vietnam ===
In Vietnamese cuisine, it is often used in pho.

== Gallery ==
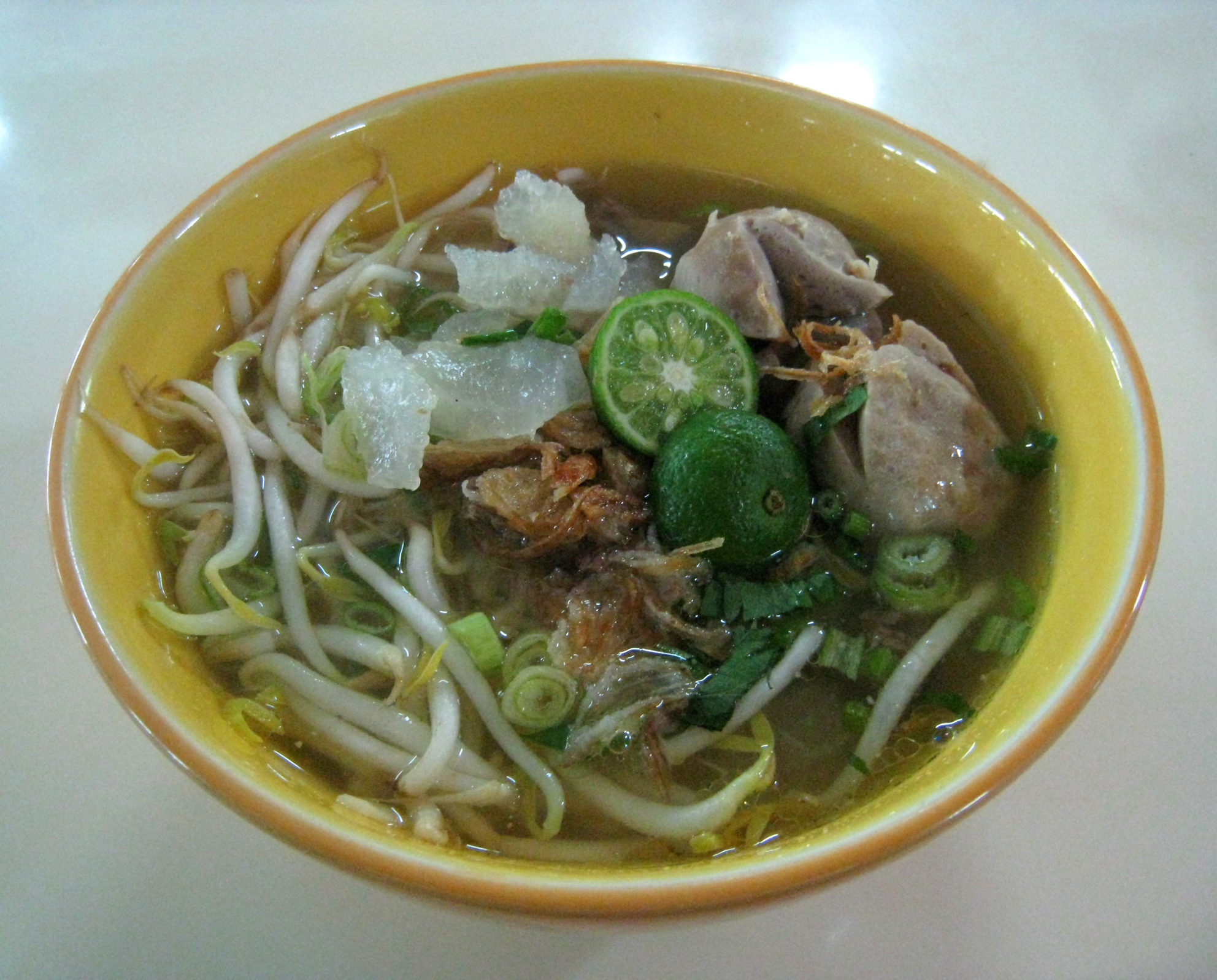
Indonesian mie kocok noodle dish uses pieces of beef tendon.

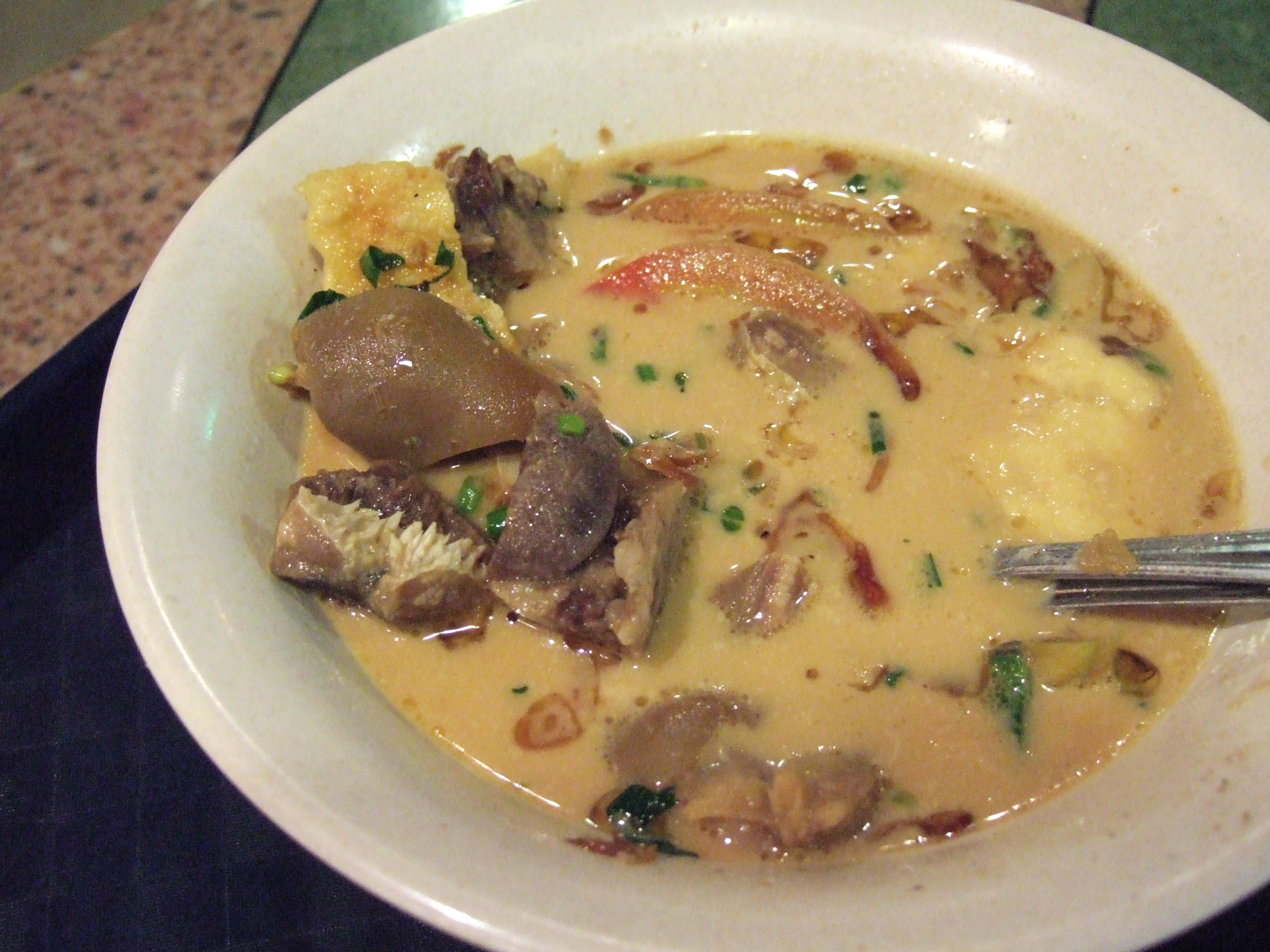
Indonesian soto kaki (tendon soup)

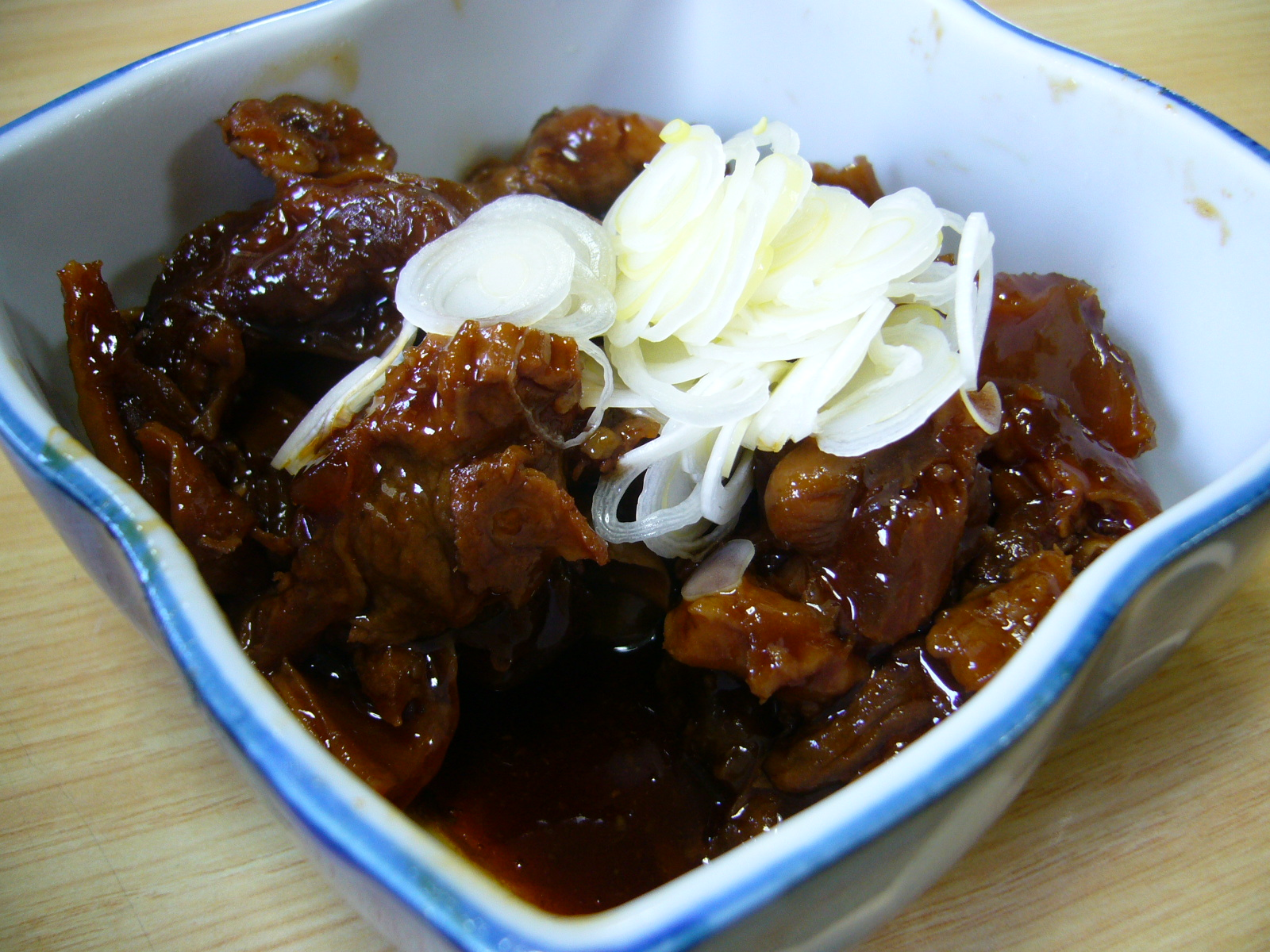
Gyū-suji nikomi (牛筋煮込み), a Japanese dish made from stewed beef tendon

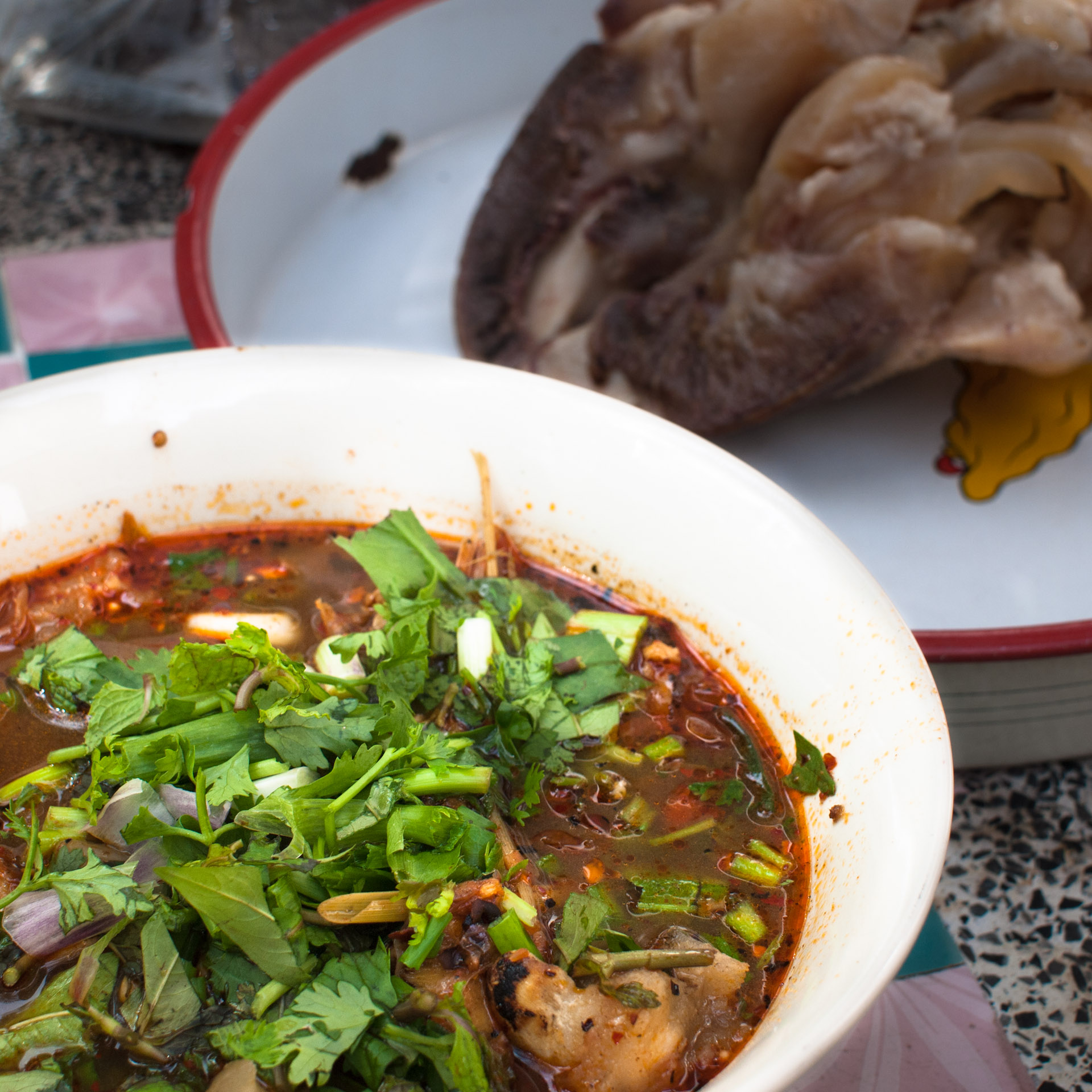
A northern Thai soup made from the hoof of the water buffalo, of which the tendons and the skin are eaten

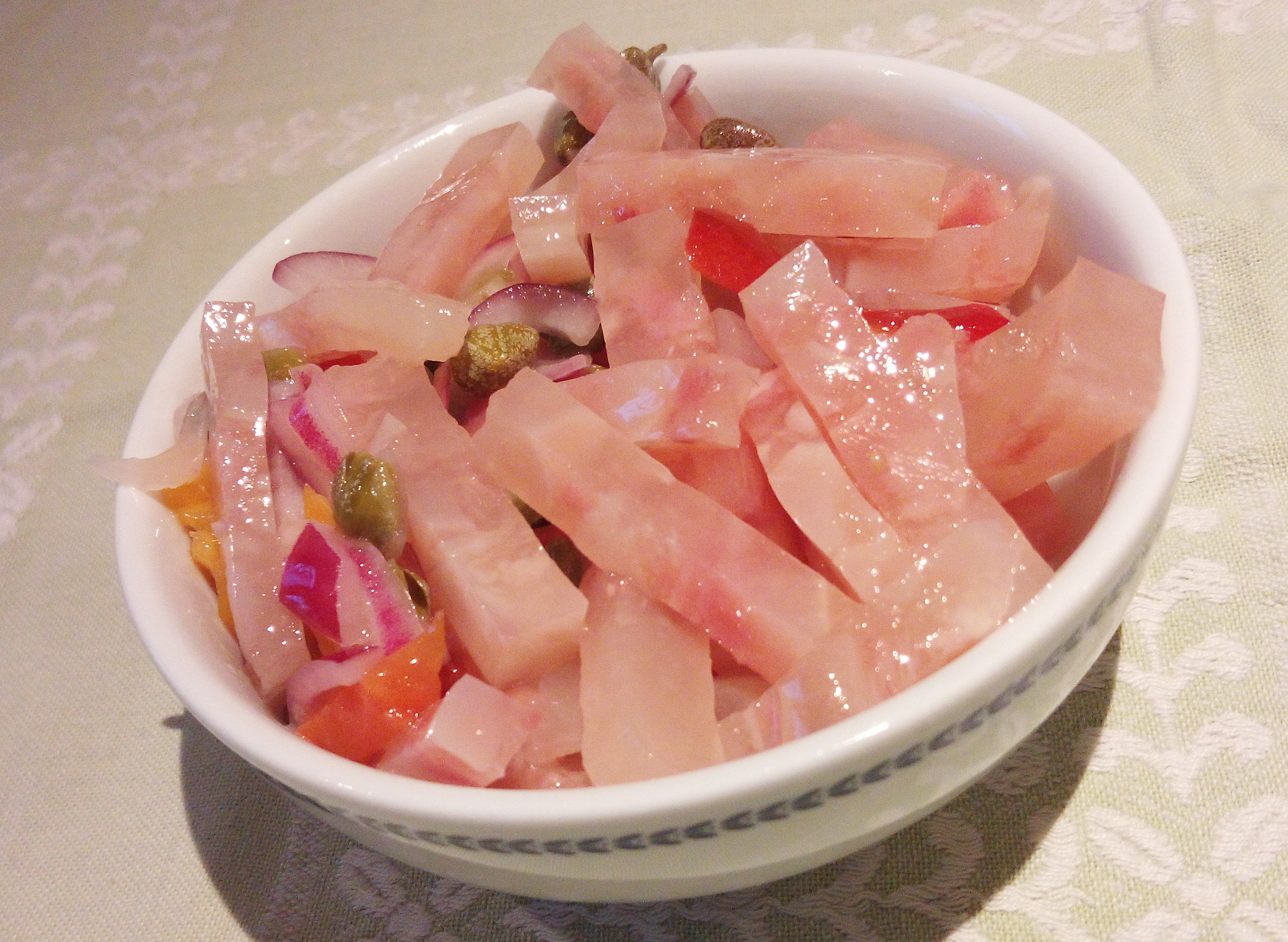
Insalata di nervetti
