= Mie kocok =

Indonesian noodle soup

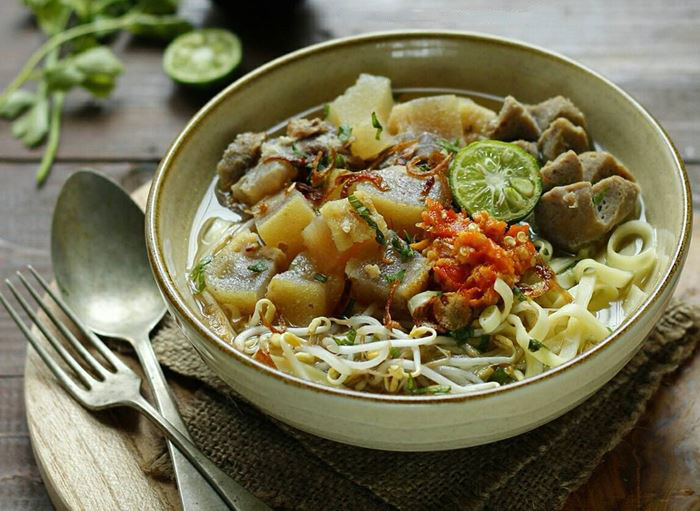
- A serving of mie kocok.
- Course: Main course
- Place of origin: Indonesia
- Region or state: Bandung, West Java
- Serving temperature: Hot
- Main ingredients: Noodle, kikil (beef tendon), beef broth, bean sprouts, bakso (beef surimi ball), scallion, fried shallot

Mie kocok (lit. 'shaken noodle') is an Indonesian beef noodle soup, a specialty of Bandung City, West Java. The dish consists of noodles served in rich beef consommé soup, kikil (beef tendon or slices of cow's trotters), bean sprouts and bakso (beef meatball), kaffir lime juice, and sprinkled with sliced fresh celery, scallion, and fried shallot. Some recipes might add beef tripe.

In Indonesian the term kocok means "shake", and it refers to the method of softening and cooking the noodles by shaking the noodles placed in a handled porous tin container while being simmered in hot water. The dish uses flat yellow noodles.

To add taste and spiciness kecap manis (sweet soy sauce) and sambal might be added. A similar but slightly different chicken-based noodle dish from the neighboring city of Cirebon is called mie koclok.

== Other version ==
There is another version of mie kocok in Aceh. The main ingredients are noodles, bean sprouts, and broth. The toppings may be boiled egg, ebi (grated shrimp), emping or krupuk, perkedel, chicken meat or beef, depending on the region. In Sabang, mie kocok consists of noodles, seasoned diced fish, bean sprouts, and egg.

== Gallery ==
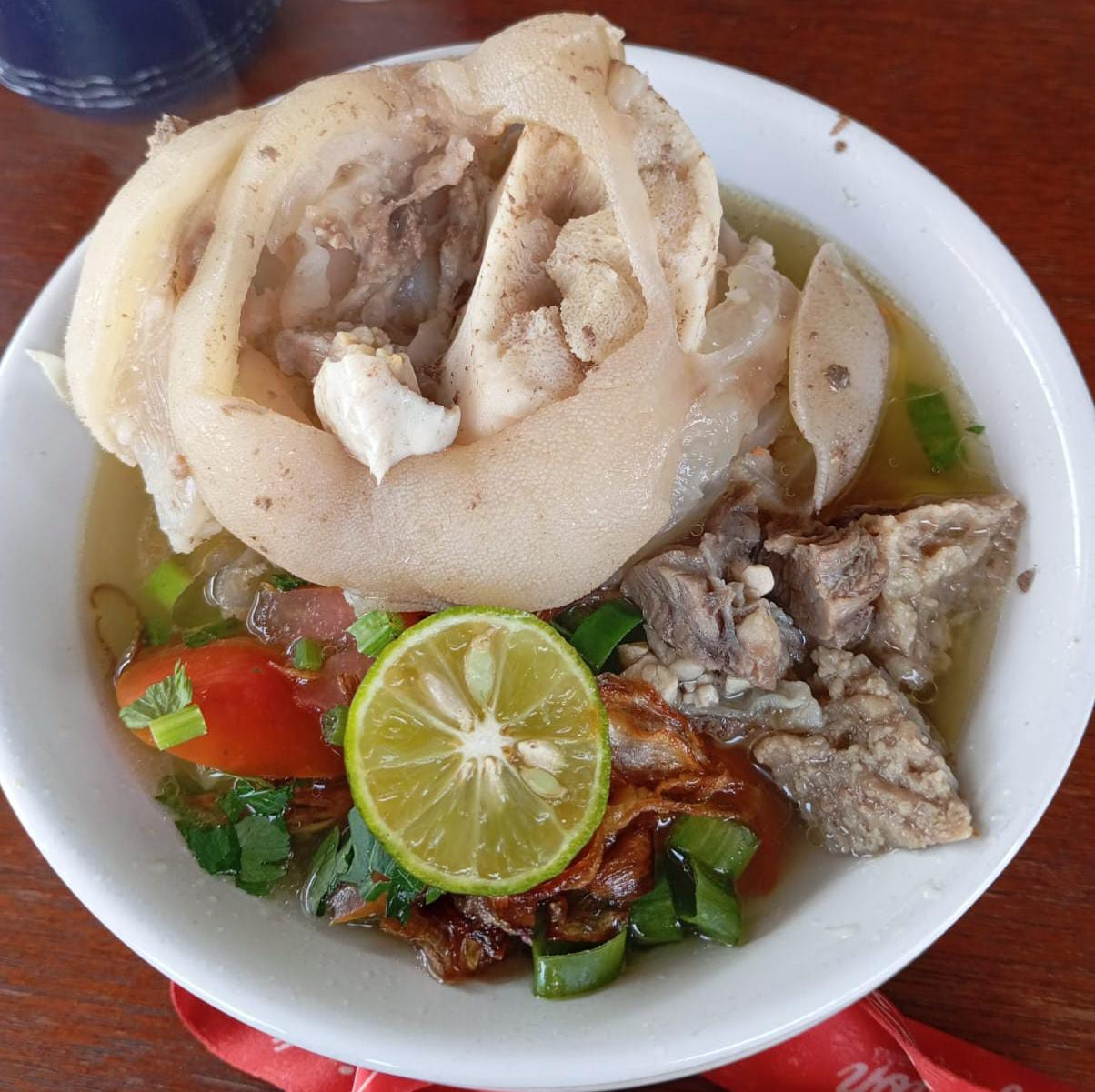
Bandung-style cow's trotter mie kocok

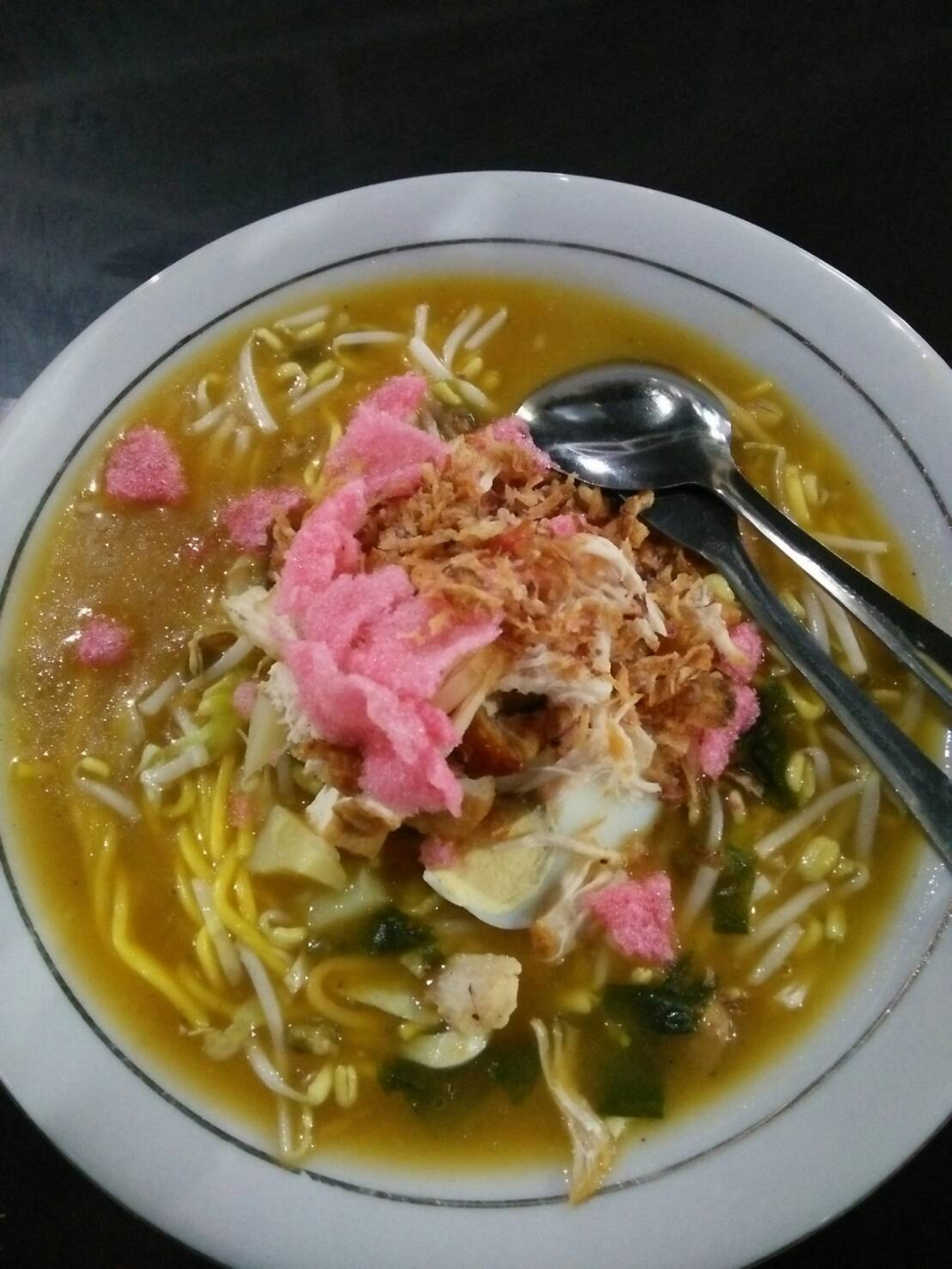
Aceh-style mie kocok in Lhoksukon

== See also ==
- Mie koclok
- Mie kopyok
- Mie celor
- List of soups
