= Cilok =

Indonesian tapioca balls snack from West Java

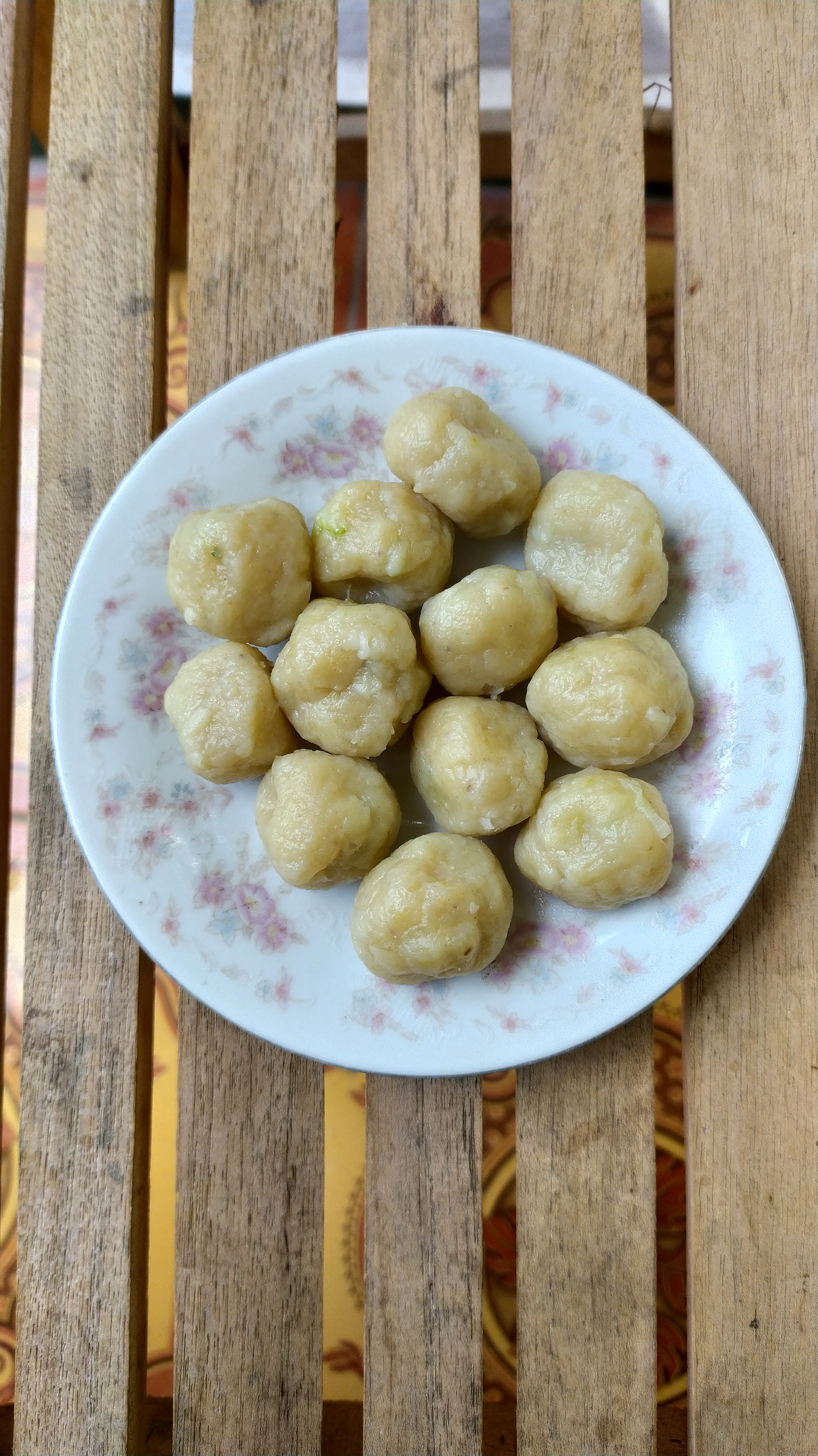
- Cilok kukus (dry variant of cilok, without broth soup)
- Course: Snack
- Place of origin: Indonesia
- Region or state: West Java, Banten, Jakarta
- Serving temperature: Hot
- Main ingredients: Tapioca ball dumplings served in peanut sauce or sambal
- Variations: cilok kuah, cilor, cimol, bacil (bakso cilok), cikar (cilok bakar or grilled cilok)

Cilok (Aksara Sunda: ᮎᮤᮜᮧᮊ᮪) is an Indonesian ball-shaped dumpling made from aci (tapioca starch), a Sundanese snack originated from Indonesia. In Sundanese, cilok is an abbreviation of aci dicolok or "poked tapioca", since the tapioca balls are poked with lidi skewers made from the midrib of the coconut palm frond.

The size of cilok balls may vary, but it is similar to another Indonesian favourite bakso meatballs, or usually smaller. Cilok balls are boiled until cooked or deep fried in ample of cooking oil, and might be served with peanut sauce, kecap manis (sweet soy sauce), sambal, bottled chili sauce, or served in soup. The texture of cilok is quite chewy, and its shape and texture are quite similar to Japanese dango, although almost all of cilok variants are savoury compared to sweet dango.

Cilok is a popular street snack, usually sold by travelling vendors using carts or bicycles frequenting residential areas, marketplace, busy street-side, or stationed in front of schools. The chewy tapioca balls with savoury peanut sauce are popular snack among Indonesians.

== Types and variants ==
Basic or common cilok are usually tapioca balls skewered and served in peanut sauce. However, there are a number of variants of additions, fillings and sauces that depend on the creativity of the cooks. An example is cilok filled with quail eggs and served in ebi dried shrimp sauce. The many different varieties of cilok are usually named after the various additional ingredients and seasonings served with them. Types and variants among others are:

Cilok biasa
Common simple cilok sold by street vendors. Usually plain tapioca balls (without fillings) skewered and served in peanut sauce, sweet soy sauce, and sambal chili sauce, placed inside a plastic pouch.
Cilok daging
Meat cilok with the addition of minced beef into tapioca dough, almost similar to beef bakso meatball.
Cilok kuah
Refer to cilok served in broth soup in similar fashion as bakso meatballs.
Cilok goang
Similar to cilok kuah; served in broth soup, but cilok goang is far more hot and spicy due to generous addition of sambal goang chili sauce.
Cilok goreng
Deep-fried skewered cilok served with powder seasoning or hot peanut sauce.
Cilok isi ayam
Cilok filled with seasoned chicken meat.
Cimol
Derived from Sundanese abbreviation aci di-gemol (round-shaped aci), with gemol being a Sundanese word meaning "make into a rounded shape". The preparation method for cimol involves deep frying the tapioca balls and then sprinkled with chili powder.
Cilor
Also derived from Sundanese abbreviation aci telor (aci with fried egg), which is skewered aci balls deep fried with egg batter coatings. Usually cilor are seasoned with powdered flavorings, sambal chili sauce or sweet soy sauce.

== Gallery ==
Cilok

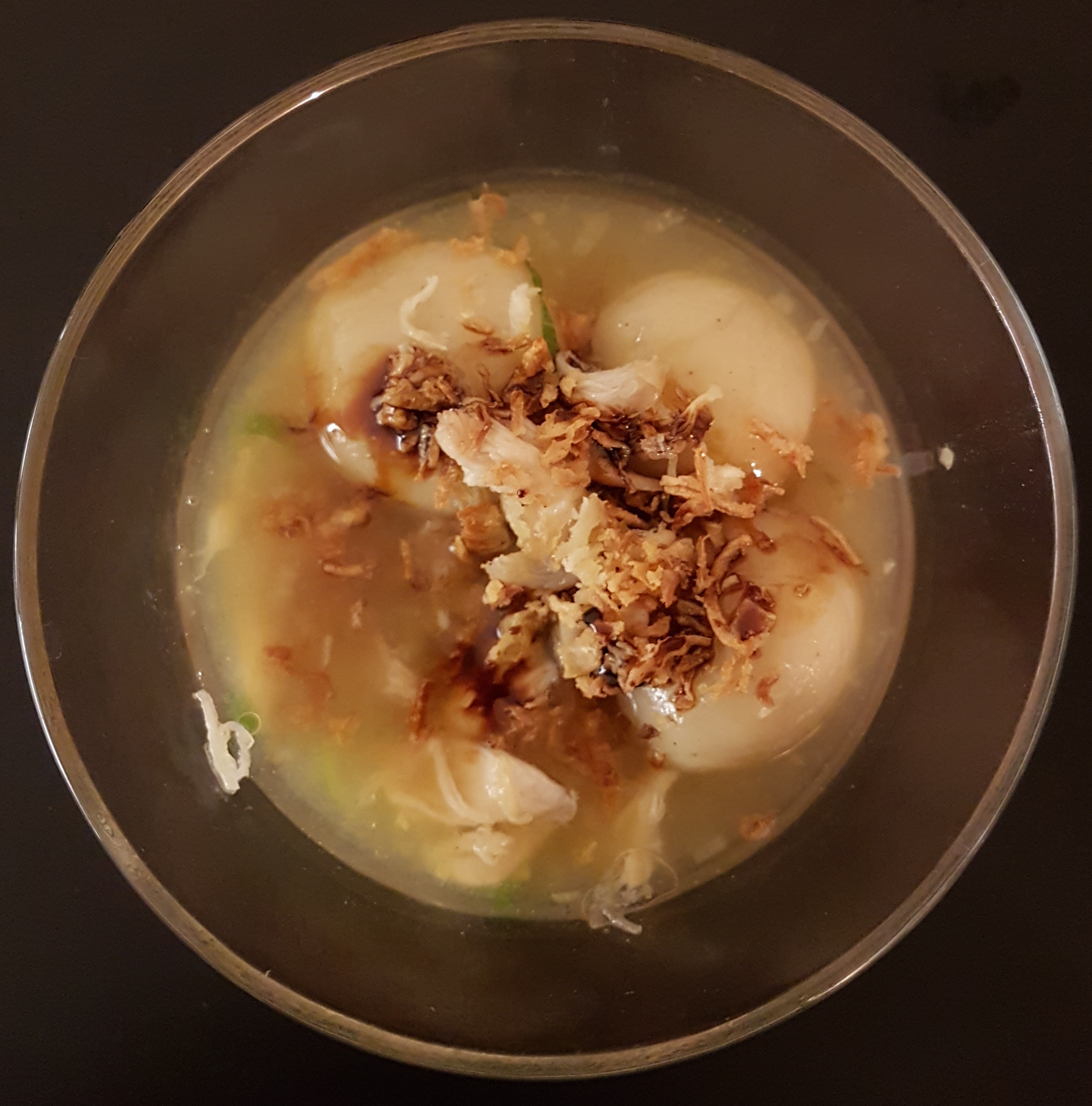
Cilok kuah served in broth soup

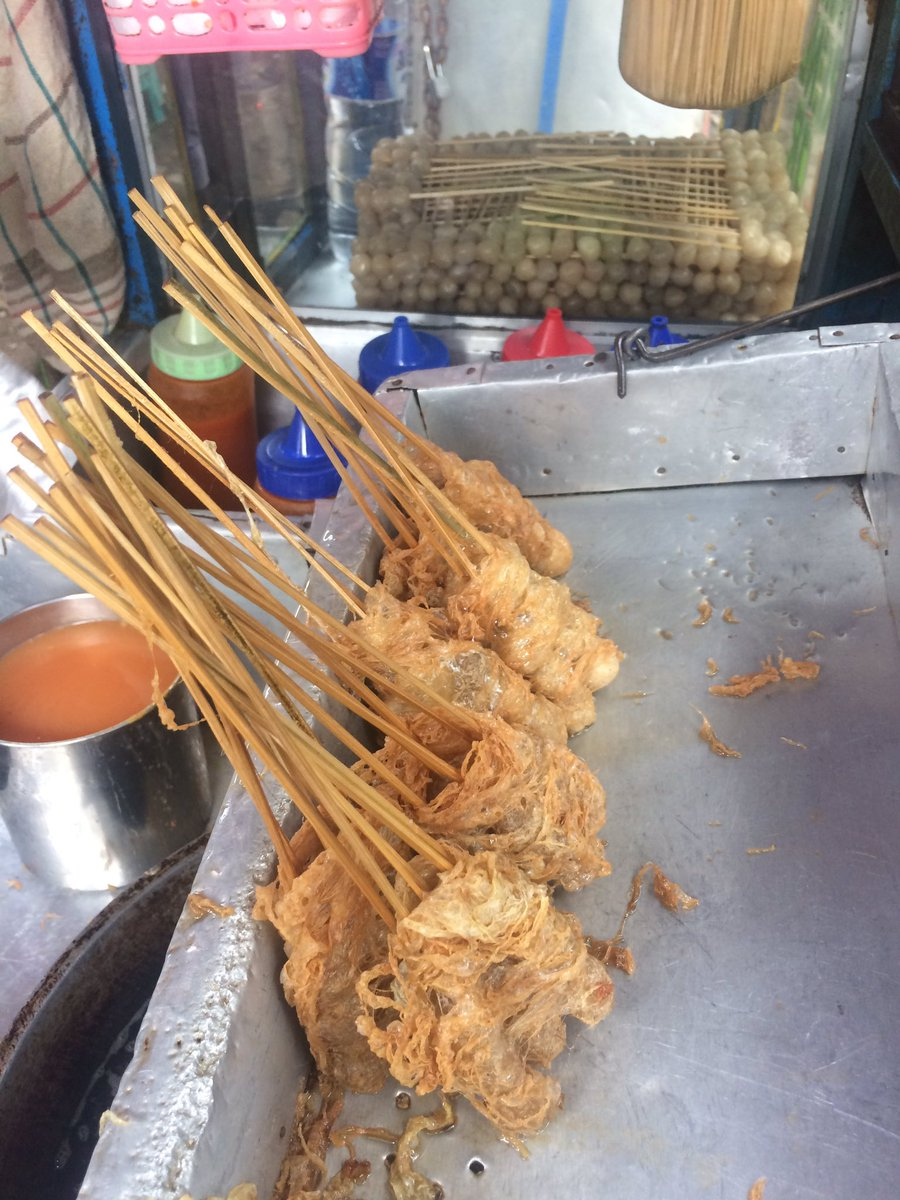
Cilor, deep fried skewered tapioca balls coated with egg batter

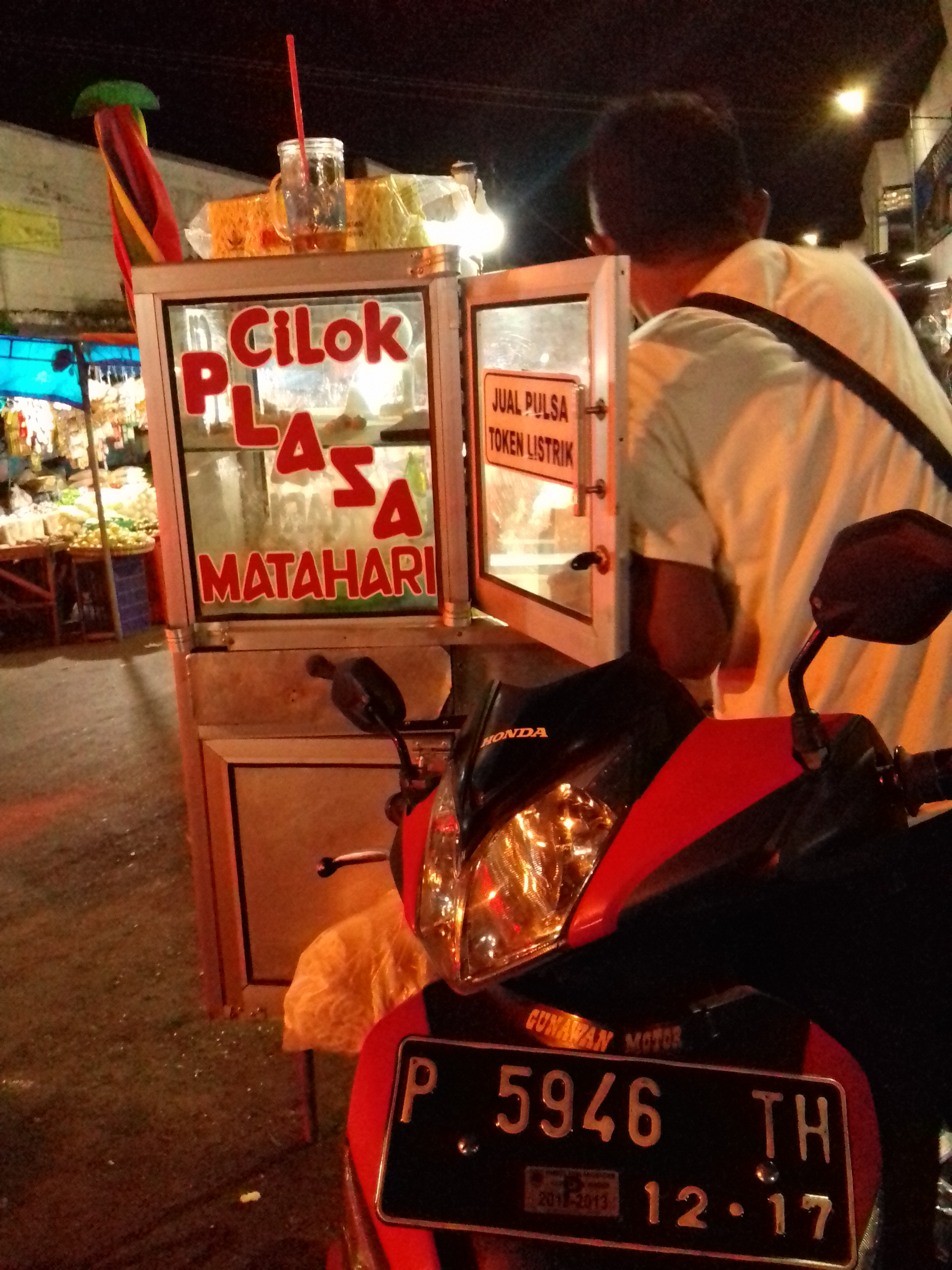
Cilok street vendor on motorcycle

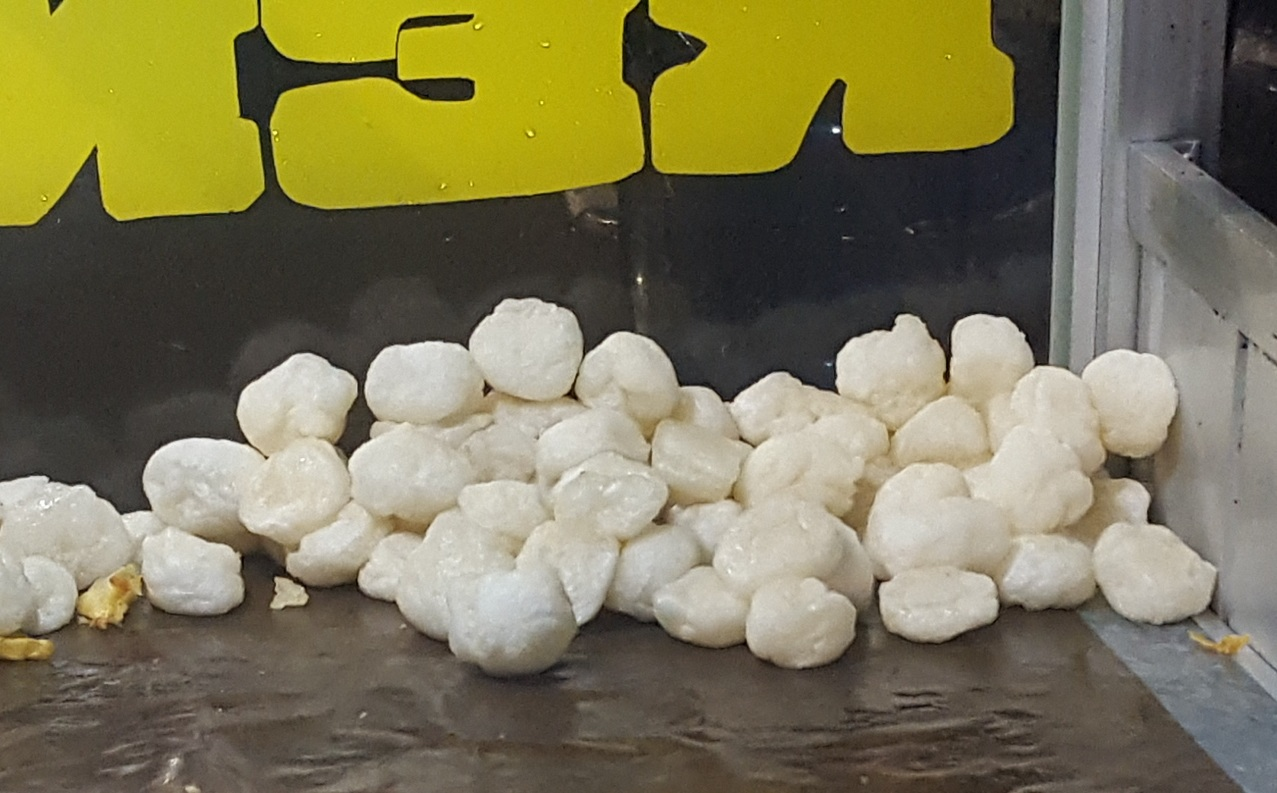
Cimol, deep fried tapioca balls seasoned with powdered flavourings

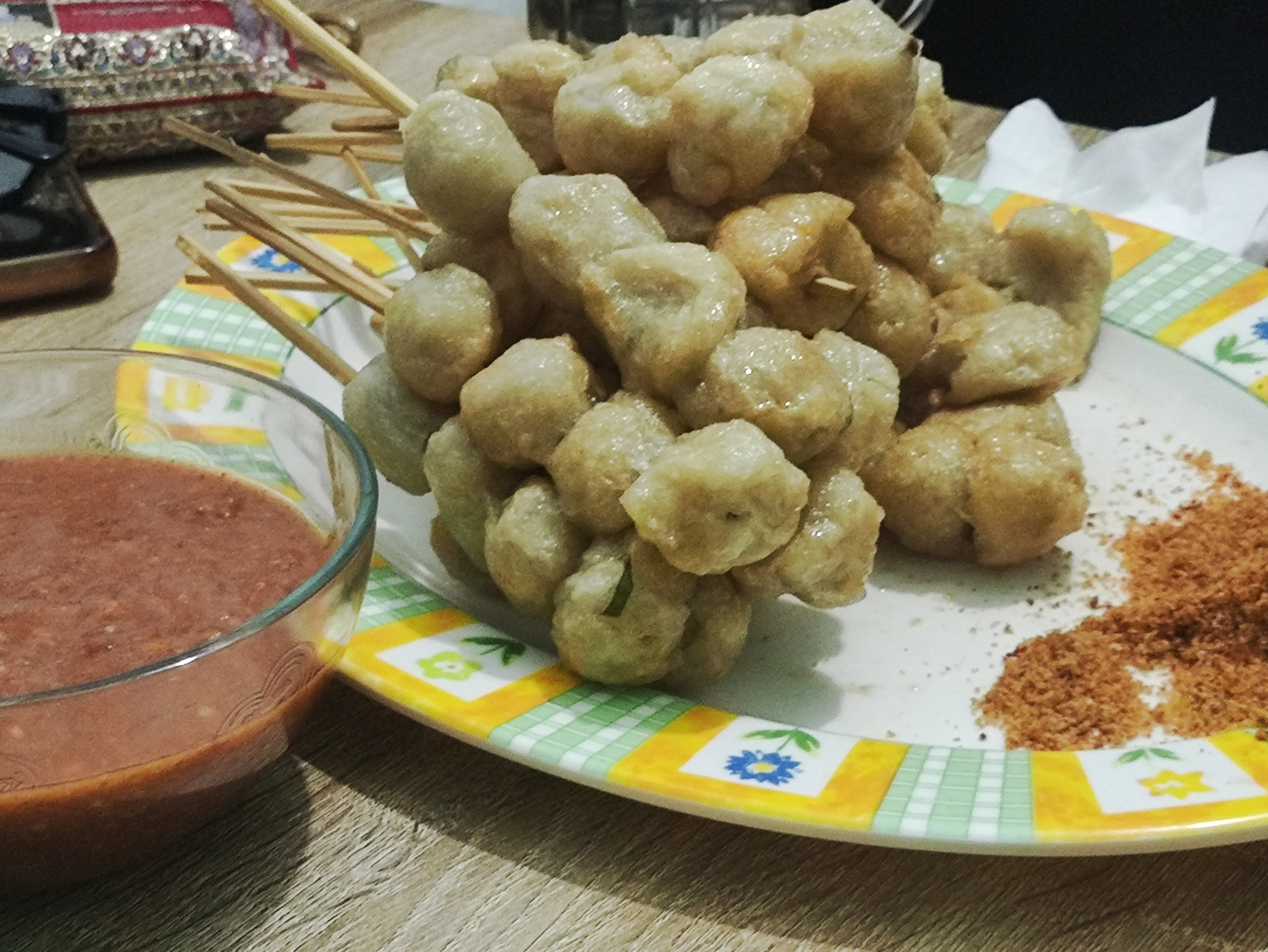
Cilok goreng with peanut sauce and powder seasoning

== See also ==
- Bakso
- Dango
- Pentol
- Tteok-bokki
- Tapioca balls
- List of dumplings
