= Pentol =

Indonesian snack

Pentol (Aksara Jawa: ꦥꦼꦤ꧀ꦛꦺꦴꦭ꧀) is an Indonesian snack. It is a type of meatball made with flour and is typically served with peanut sauce, tomato sauce, soy sauce, or sambal.

Pentol is often found in East Java, Central Java and Yogyakarta. It is generally sold per count at a price according to the size and contents of the pentol, starting from 200 rupiah to 1000 rupiah per count. Pentol is usually sold on carts, motorbikes, bicycles, or on foot. Part of the reason pentol is popular, especially in rural areas, is because of its low price and good taste while being quite filling.

In Sumatra, there is pentol/pentul ikan which is made from a mixture of fish and bumbu that is skewered and fried.

== Gallery ==
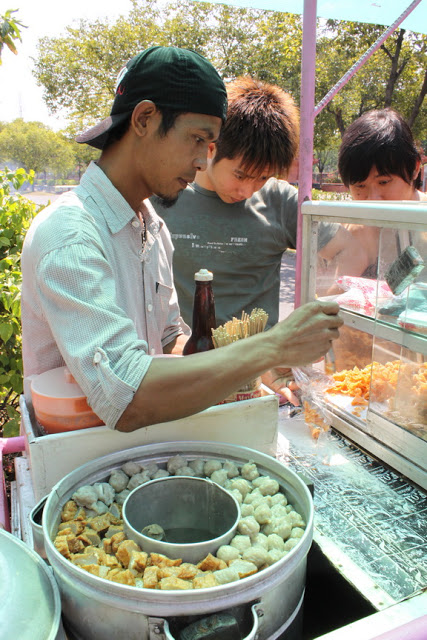
Pentol seller

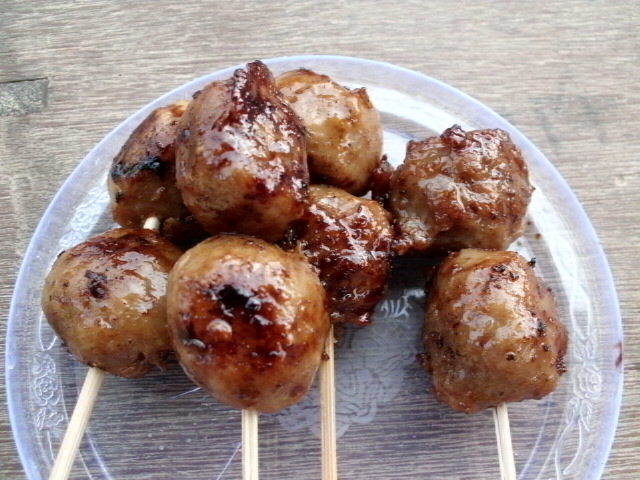
Grilled pentol

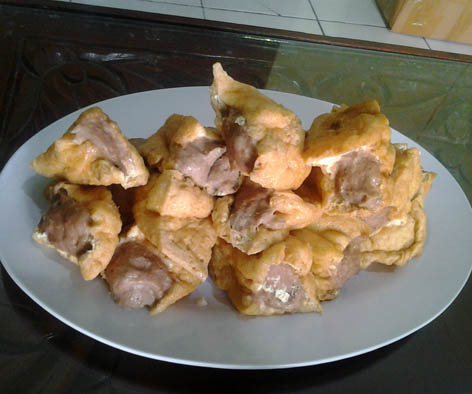
Pentol tofu

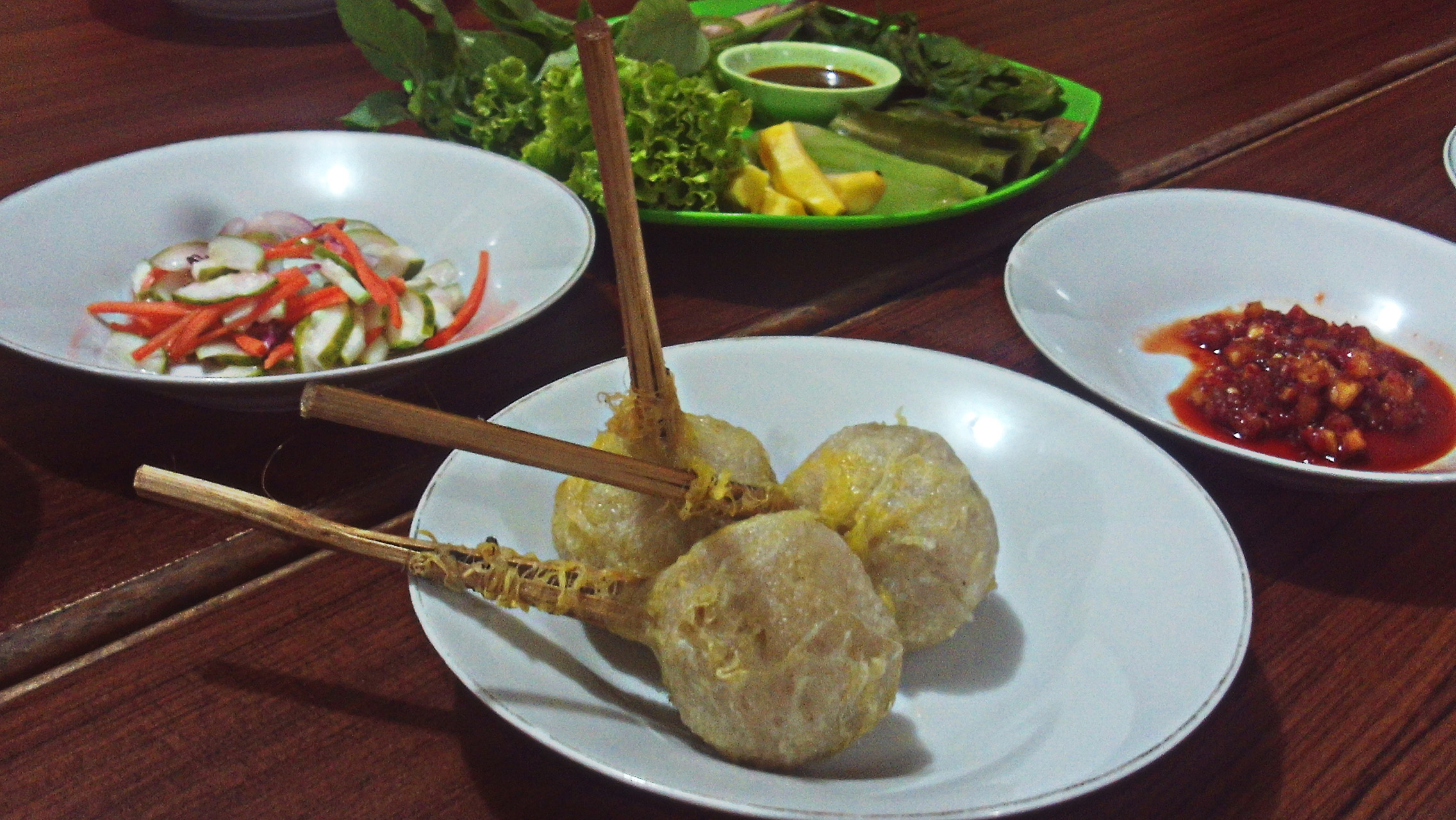
Pentol ikan

== See also ==
- List of meatball dishes
- Bakso
- Cilok
