= Jiangshui noodles =

Chinese noodle dish

- Simplified: 浆水面
- Traditional: 漿水麵
- Named by: Liu Bang and Xiao He
- Also translated as: souherb noodles

Jiangshui noodles (simplified Chinese: 浆水面; traditional Chinese: 漿水麵), known as jiangshuimian in Chinese, sometimes translated as souherb noodles, also called sour water noodles, is a kind of noodle with souherb as the soup. It is a speciality of Guanzhong and is widely popular in Lanzhou, Tianshui, Dingxi, Linxia and other places.

According to the legend, the name of "Jiangshui noodles" was given by Liu Bang and Xiao He. Although jiangshuimian was named by Liu and Xiao, jiangshui already appeared around the Western Zhou dynasty.
