= Mie koclok =

Indonesian chicken noodle food

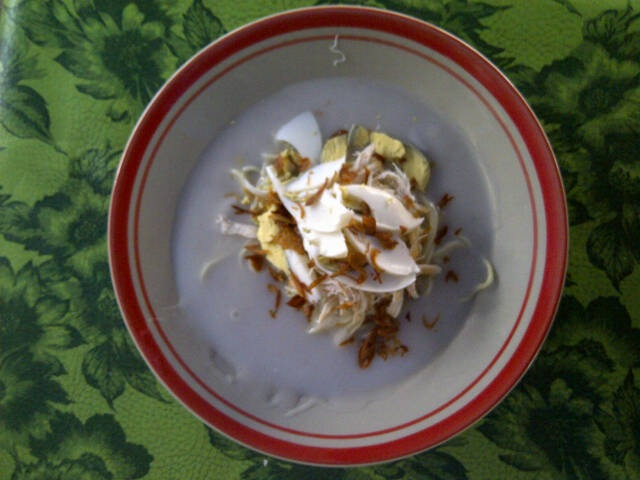
- Mie koclok in Cirebon
- Alternative names: Mi koclok
- Type: Noodle soup
- Course: Main
- Place of origin: Indonesia
- Region or state: Cirebon, West Java
- Serving temperature: Hot
- Main ingredients: Bean sprout, egg noodle, chicken breast, corn starch, coconut milk, cabbage, boiled egg

Mie koclok (lit. 'shaked noodle'), is an Indonesian chicken noodle soup, a specialty of the city of Cirebon, West Java. The noodles come with a white-colored extra-thick porridge-like soup, made of chicken broth and coconut milk soup, which is coagulated with corn starch or tapioca. Other ingredients include shredded chicken breast, cabbage, bean sprouts, hard boiled egg, kaffir lime juice, and sprinkled with sliced fresh celery, spring onion, and fried shallot.

In the Cirebonese dialect, the term koclok means "shake", and refers to the method of softening and cooking the noodles by shaking them in a handled porous tin container as they are simmered in hot water. The dish commonly uses thick yellow egg noodles, but some might add bihun (rice vermicelli).

For taste, spiciness, and texture, kecap manis (sweet soy sauce), sambal, and emping crackers might be added. A similarly-named but slightly different beef-based noodle dish from the neighboring city of Bandung is mie kocok.

== See also ==
- Mie ayam
- Mie celor
- Mie kocok
- Javanese cuisine
- Sundanese cuisine
- Noodle soup
