= Sarong (food) =

Thai snack food

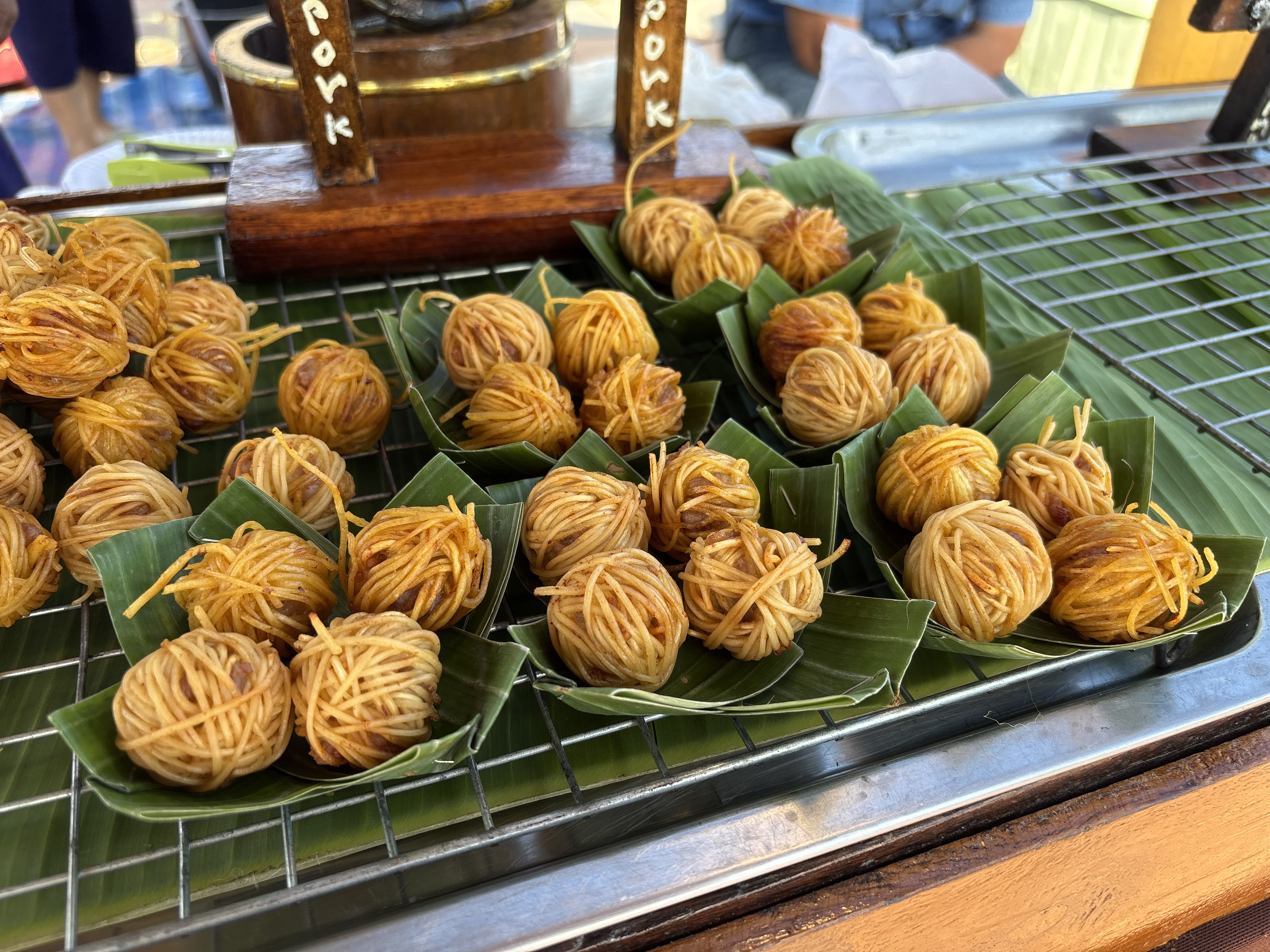
- Pork sarongs sold at a street market in Sukhothai Historical Park
- Alternative names: Srong
- Course: snack
- Place of origin: Thailand
- Main ingredients: minced pork or chicken, misua or thin noodles, eggs

Sarong (Thai: สร่ง) is a snack of Thailand made from seasoned minced pork or chicken, shaped into balls, wrapped in misua or thin noodles, and deep-fried until golden. It has a shape akin to a takraw ball. Sarongs are often eaten with a dipping sauce. Sarong was first introduced in Rattanakosin era, initially as a royal cuisine (อาหารชาววัง; ahan chao wang) due to the high prices of misua noodles at the time. Outside the royal court, sarongs were made with chicken in place of pork, and eggs in place of misua. There were reports of minced fish being used as well, but to a lesser popularity.
