= Batchoy Tagalog =

Filipino meat and noodle soup

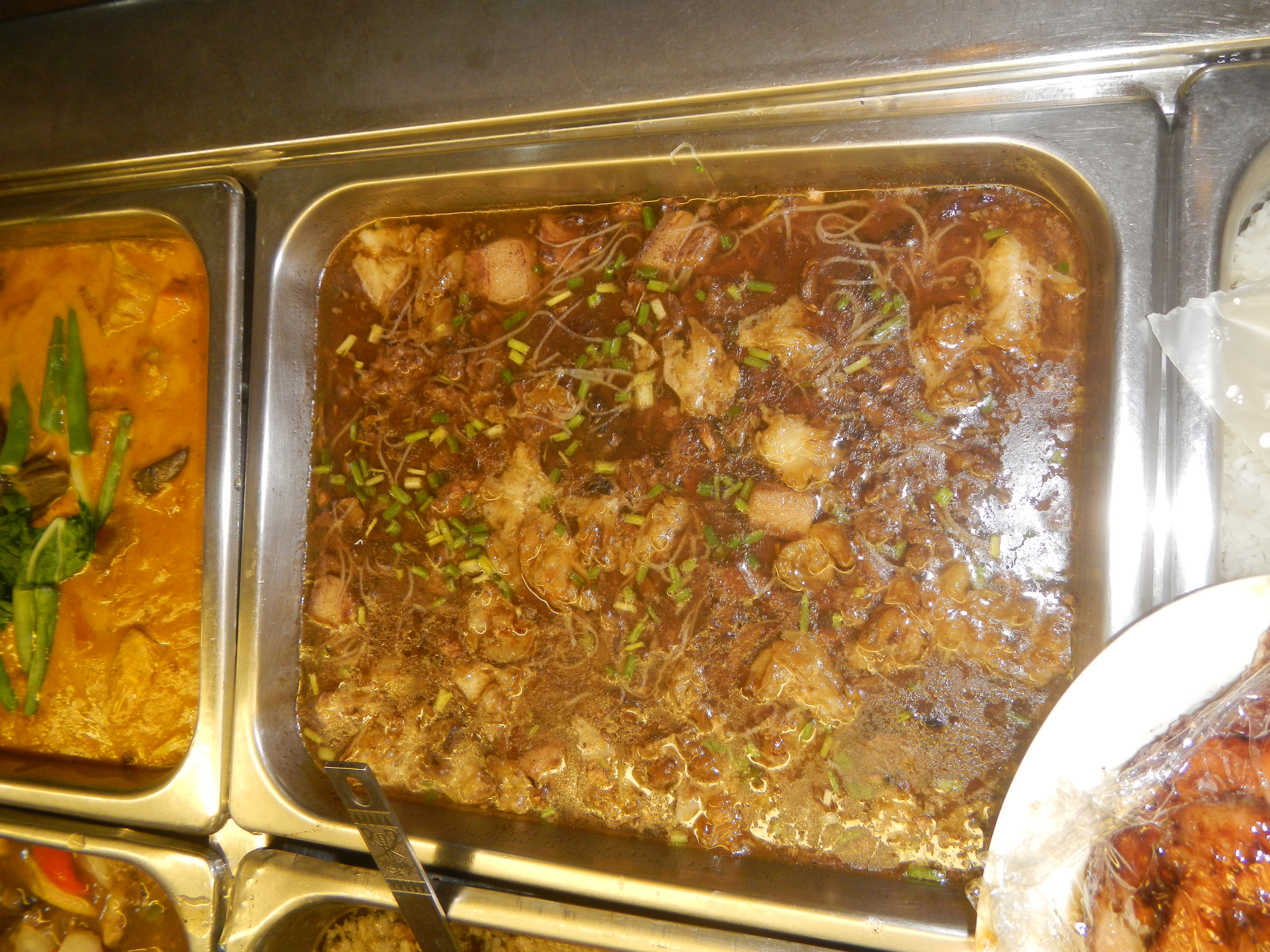
- Alternative names: Batsoy Tagalog; Sinuam/Suam (dialectal, Rizal); Sutsa/Syutsa (dialectal, Quezon)
- Course: Soup
- Place of origin: Philippines
- Region or state: Luzon
- Serving temperature: Hot
- Main ingredients: Noodles, pork, pork offals, pork blood, chili leaves or garlic chives, onion, garlic, ginger
- Variations: Bumbay (Batchoy)

Batchoy Tagalog (Note: also batsoy Tagalog) (Tagalog: ᜊᜆ᜔ᜐᜓᜌ᜔; a.k.a. sutsa/syutsa in Quezon, sinuam in Angono, Rizal) is a traditional Filipino food originating in Luzon. This soup is made with pork, pork offal, pork blood, noodles (usually misua), chili leaves or garlic chives, green chilies, garlic, onions, and ginger. This dish is usually paired with or eaten with cooked rice as a viand.

Batchoy Tagalog is a common household dish, especially in countryside communities in the provinces. It is a staple whenever a small farm owner butchers a pig to sell to the neighborhood. The cooking method is similar to the usual cooking method of Filipino foods like minanok na baka and tinola. It has a similar ginger-flavored broth with chili leaves added. Traditionally, a minimal amount of pork blood or pork blood cubes is added to the soup.

== Varieties ==
Varieties of batchoy Tagalog depend on the household's preference or accustomed way of cooking. Aside from misua, sotanghon is another commonly used noodle in the soup. A variation of batchoy without pork blood or without noodles is also common in the localities.

One of the distinctive versions of batchoy Tagalog is the comfort soup named Bombay, or Bumbay, from the province of Quezon. The name depicts the turban worn by Indians who came to the local communities many years ago. The dish is made with a mixture of ingredients, such as ground pork, pork offal, and other seasonings, which are customarily assembled in a banana leaf pouch shaped like a turban and then simmered. Mushrooms, corn, and sweet potato shoots are may also added to the dish. It is then poured with a flavorful broth. This soup is usually eaten with steamed rice.

== See also ==
- Tinola
- Dinuguan
- La Paz Batchoy
- Noodle soup
- Pork blood soup
