= Iloilo Desalination Plant =

Desalination plant in the Philippines

- Interactive map of Iloilo Desalination Plant
- Location: La Paz, Iloilo City, Philippines
- Coordinates: 10°43′17.2″N 122°35′43.8″E
- Estimated output: 65.5 million L (17.3 million US gal) per day (planned)
- Cost: ₱5 billion
- Technology: Reverse osmosis
- Operation date: Early 2027 (planned)

The Iloilo Desalination Plant is a desalination plant under-construction in Iloilo City. It is developed by Metro Pacific Water.

== History ==
Metro Pacific Water (MPW) started pre-development works on a future desalination plant project in Iloilo City in January 2024. On June 26, 2024, MPW signed an agreement with French firm Suez to develop the treated water production facility.

The groundbreaking ceremony for the Iloilo City desalination plant at La Paz was held on February 21, 2025. JEMCO is also involved in the construction.

Upon completion the ₱5 billion facility will become the largest desalination plant in the Philippines by capacity. It is projected to be operational by early 2027.

== Facility ==
The Iloilo Desalination Plant will have the capacity to produce 66.5 million L (17.6 million US gal) of water daily serving residents of Iloilo City and Iloilo province. It will increase the water production of distributor Metro Pacific Iloilo Water (MPIW).
