= Batchoy =

Filipino noodle soup

La Paz batchoy
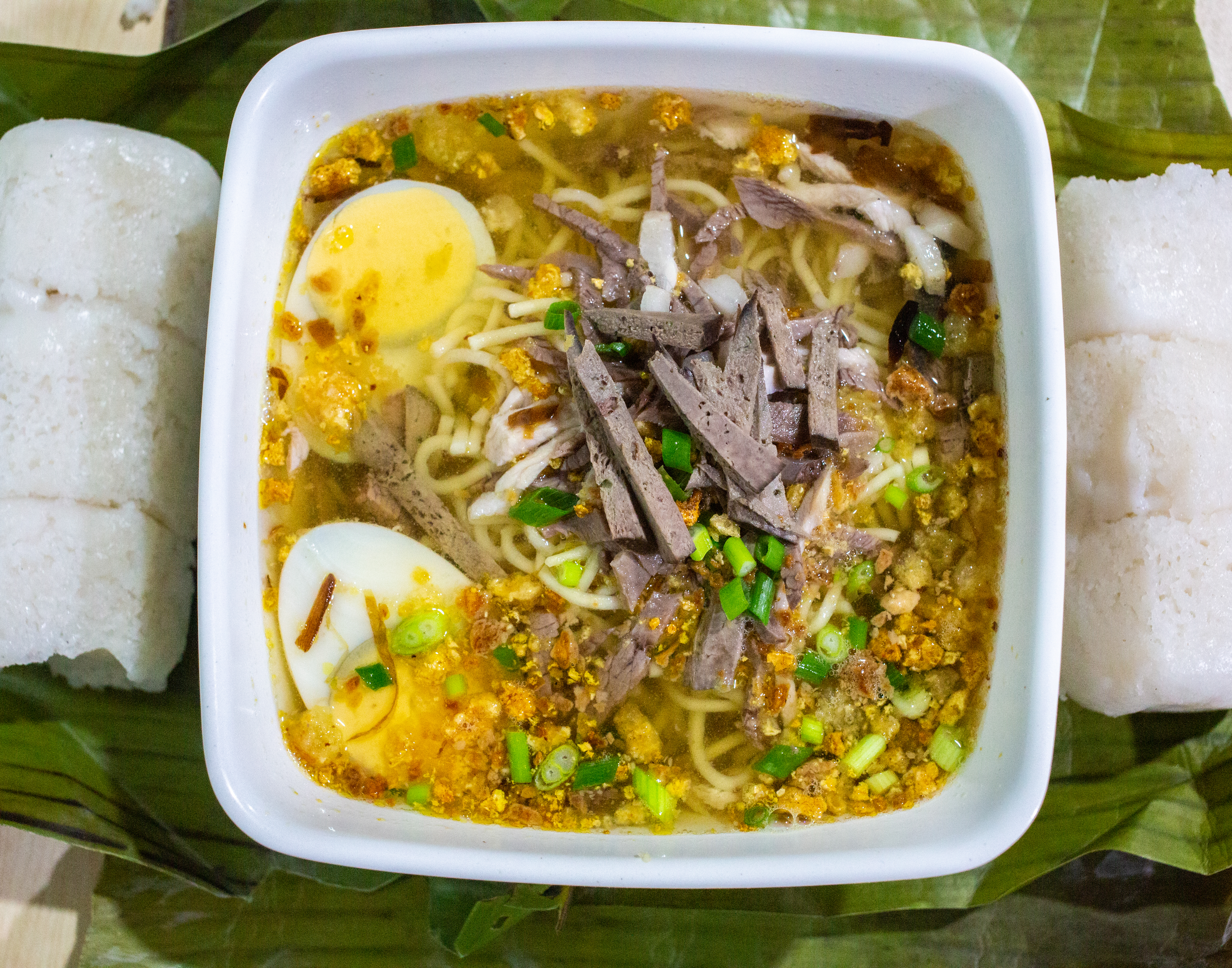
- A bowl of La Paz batchoy with puto
- Alternative names: Bah-chhùi (Hokkien Chinese); Batsoy (Tagalog); Bachoy (Spanish)
- Course: Soup
- Place of origin: Philippines
- Region or state: La Paz, Iloilo City
- Serving temperature: Hot
- Main ingredients: Noodles, pork organs, vegetables, chicken, shrimp, beef
- Variations: Batchoy Tagalog, Bumbay

Batchoy, alternatively spelled batsoy ([ˈbatʃoɪ]), is a Filipino noodle soup of pork offal, crushed pork cracklings, chicken stock, beef loin, and round noodles. The original and most popular variant, La Paz batchoy, traces its roots to the Iloilo City district of La Paz, in the Philippines.

== Origin ==
The origin of La Paz batchoy is unclear, with several accounts claiming credit for the dish:

- Domingo Lozada opened their batchoy stall, Inggo's Batchoy, in 1922 and claims to be the first batchoy shop in La Paz, Iloilo City, 16 years ahead of Deco's La Paz Batchoy Shop, which opened in 1938.
- SunStar Iloilo claims Federico Guilergan Sr. concocted the dish in 1938 in Iloilo. His recipe called for a mixture of broth, noodles, beef and pork. The soup later evolved into its present form which has become Iloilo City's most popular dish. Federico Guillergan, Jr., the son of the soup's inventor, states that his father at first jokingly called the dish "bats" when asked for its name. Later, he added "choy", from the vegetable dish chop suey.
- Teodorico "Ted" Lepura opened his first batchoy shop, Ted's Oldtimer Lapaz Batchoy, at the La Paz Public Market in 1945. Run by Lepura, his wife and their children, the shop sold what they claim to be the original La Paz batchoy which at that time was priced at 20 centavos per bowl. In the 1930s, as a teenager, Lepura learned the basics of making La Paz batchoy while working for a Chinese merchant, and eventually concocted his own version of the dish.
- Other sources claim that the dish originated from the Chinese community in La Paz, since the etymology of the name "batchoy" likely comes from the Hokkien Chinese: 肉碎; Pe̍h-ōe-jī: bah-chhùi; lit. 'minced meat' or Hokkien Chinese: 肉水; Pe̍h-ōe-jī: bah chúi; lit. 'meat water'.

== Preparation ==
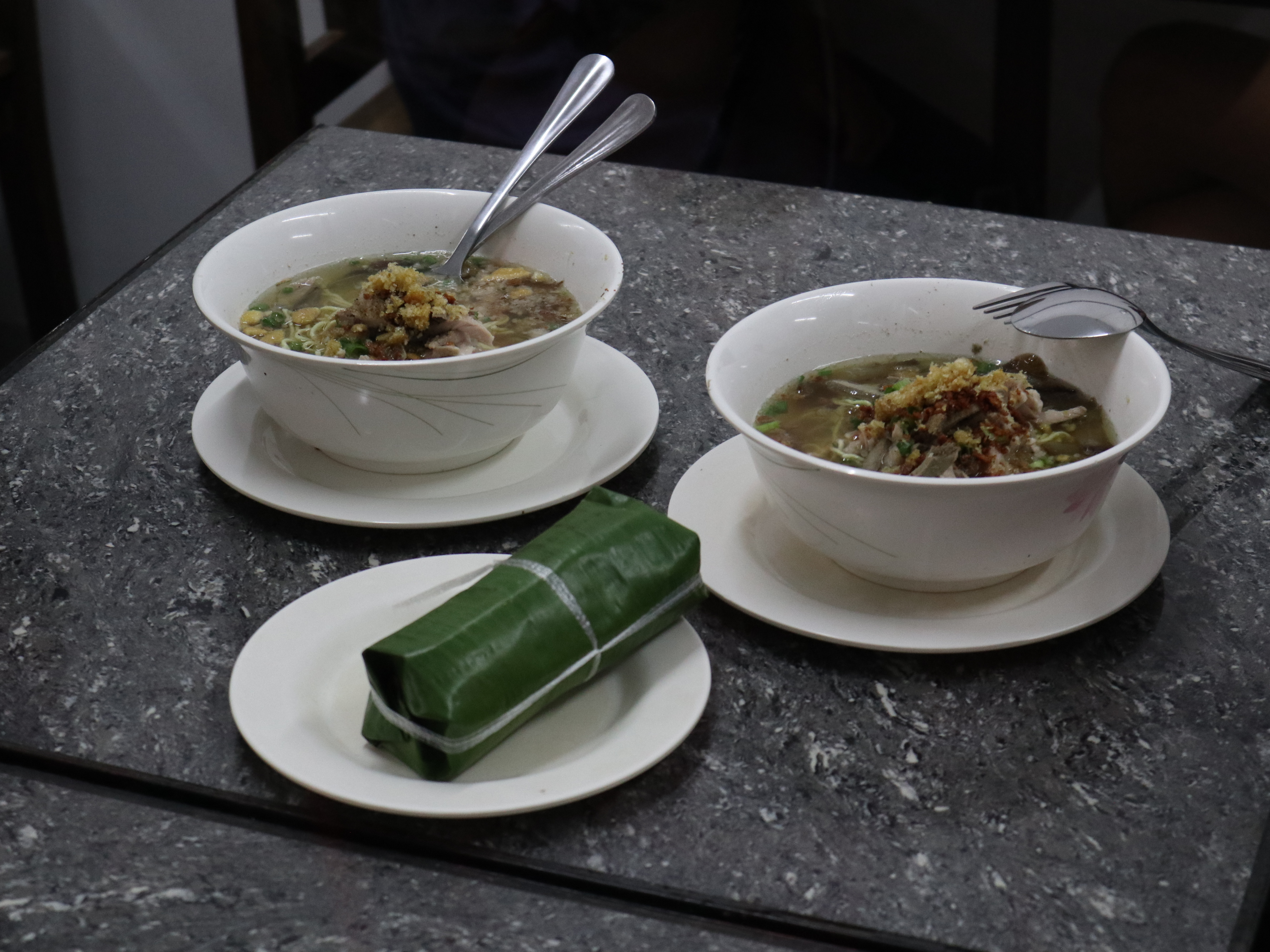
Two bowls of La Paz batchoy with a puto, served in La Paz Public Market

Ingredients of La Paz batchoy include pork offal (liver, spleen, kidneys and heart), crushed pork cracklings, beef loin, shrimp broth, and round egg noodles (miki) cooked with broth added to a bowl of noodles and topped with leeks, pork cracklings (chicharon), and sometimes a raw egg cracked on top.

== Regional varieties ==
The province of Quezon has a variation of the batsoy Tagalog, also known as bombay or bumbay which derives its name from the similarity of the tied banana leaf pouch to the appearance of the turban worn by Sikhs. The dish consists of finely chopped and seasoned pork offal wrapped in banana leaf and then boiled in water. The dish is served with its cooking broth.

== Batchoy Festival ==
The Batchoy Festival is an annual food festival held as part of the larger Dinagyang Festival in Iloilo City. First held in 2020, it features a friendly competition among aficionados and merchants to determine who offers the best-tasting batchoy. The event is a collaboration between SM City Iloilo and the Department of Tourism (DOT), and it is held and celebrated alongside the Grand Iloilo Food Festival at SM City Iloilo Southpoint every January.

== See also ==
- Cuisine of the Philippines
- Kinalas
- List of soups
- Pancit Molo
- Ramen - a similar dish from Japan
- Soto - Indonesian soups, most of which are made with chicken or beef
