= La Paz Public Market =

Public market in the Philippines

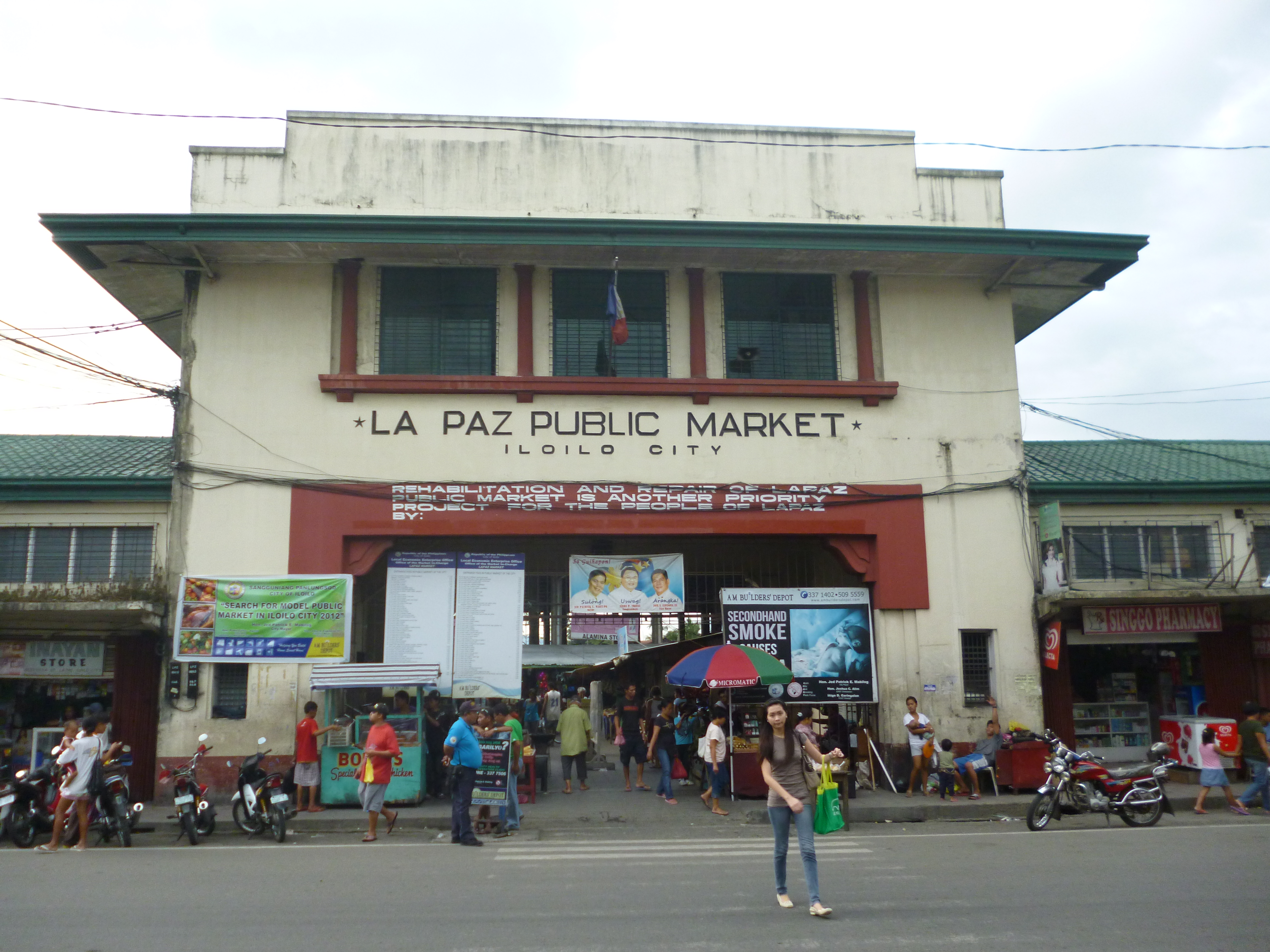
Art Deco façade of the La Paz Public Market

La Paz Public Market is a public market or palengke located in La Paz, Iloilo City, Philippines. It is considered as the birthplace of a popular Filipino dish, La Paz Batchoy.

== History ==
La Paz has operated its own market even before its conglomeration with Iloilo City in 1937. The current La Paz Public Market traces its origins to the early 1920s, evolving from a reclaimed fishpond filled with dredged materials from the Iloilo River, as documented in the Quarterly Bulletin of the Bureau of Public Works in 1918. The main market building, showcasing an Art Deco design typical of its era, was constructed between the 1920s and 1930s.

After World War II, the market resumed operations with a general covered area where vendors sold goods on tables or makeshift kiosks. In the 1960s, during the tenure of Vice Mayor Dicen, public stalls were erected and rented out to vendors. Subsequently, walls were installed between stalls, which were then individually leased.

During the 1970s and 1980s, the main building of the La Paz Public Market housed the La Paz Police Station. A significant fire in 1989 damaged parts of the market's northern section, leading to the temporary relocation of stalls to Rizal Street while repairs were undertaken. The main building of the La Paz Public Market underwent improvements and rehabilitation in the early 2000s under the initiative of Congressman Raul Gonzales Sr.

=== Rehabilitation ===
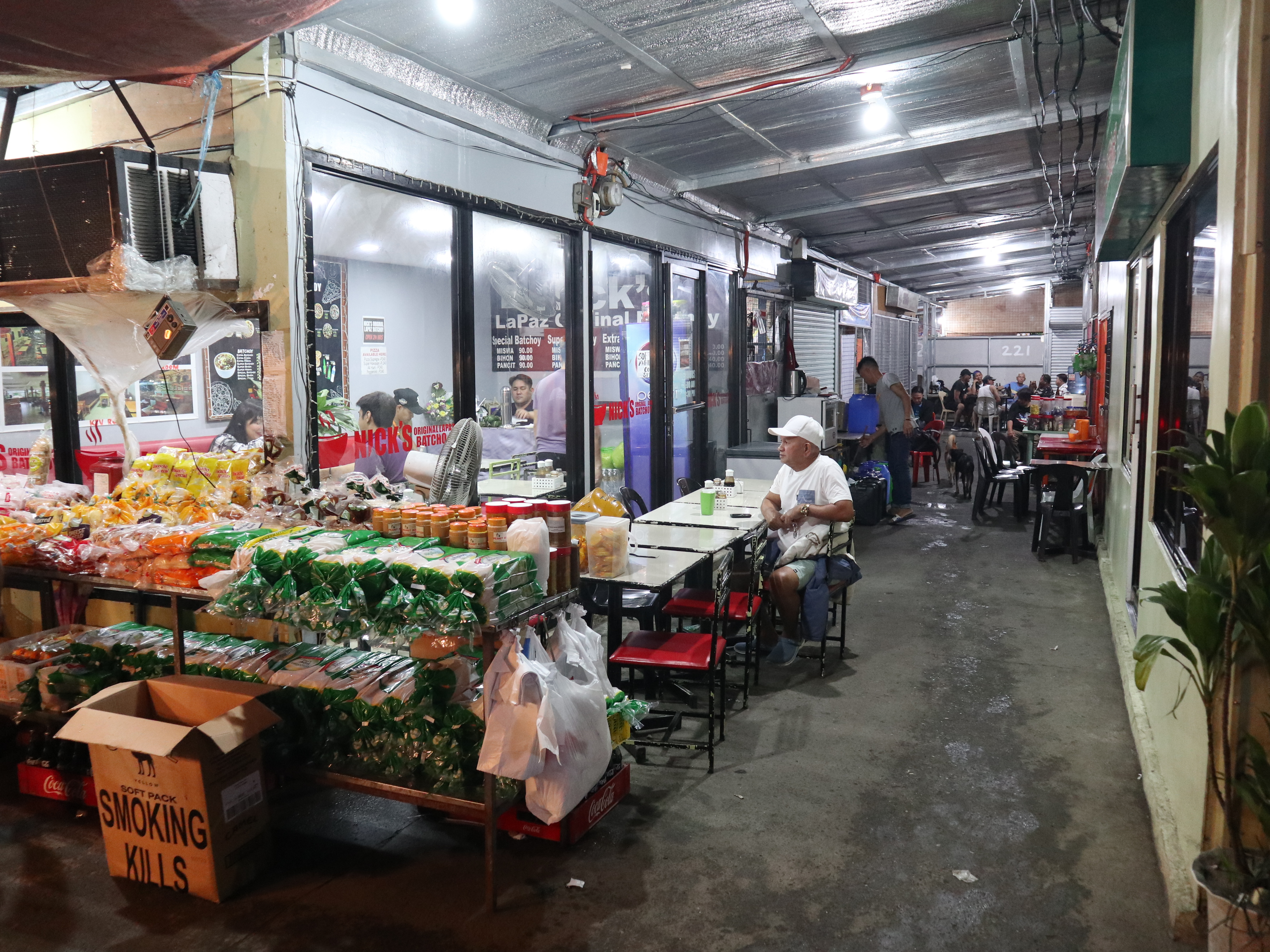
Inside of La Paz Public Market temporary site on Rizal Street

The public market underwent major rehabilitation and renovation in 2022, which necessitated the temporary relocation of stalls to Rizal Street once again. The entire market was demolished, except for the distinctive feature structure with art deco architecture, preserved for its historical value. The rehabilitated public market reopened on December 16, 2025. It now features 73 additional stalls compared to its pre-renovation configuration.

Following its reopening, the local government also structured the official market days under the Bolante Day initiative. For La Paz, this designated "Sabadohan" schedule permits transient vendors to operate from Saturday at 5:00 AM through Sunday at noon.

== La Paz Batchoy ==
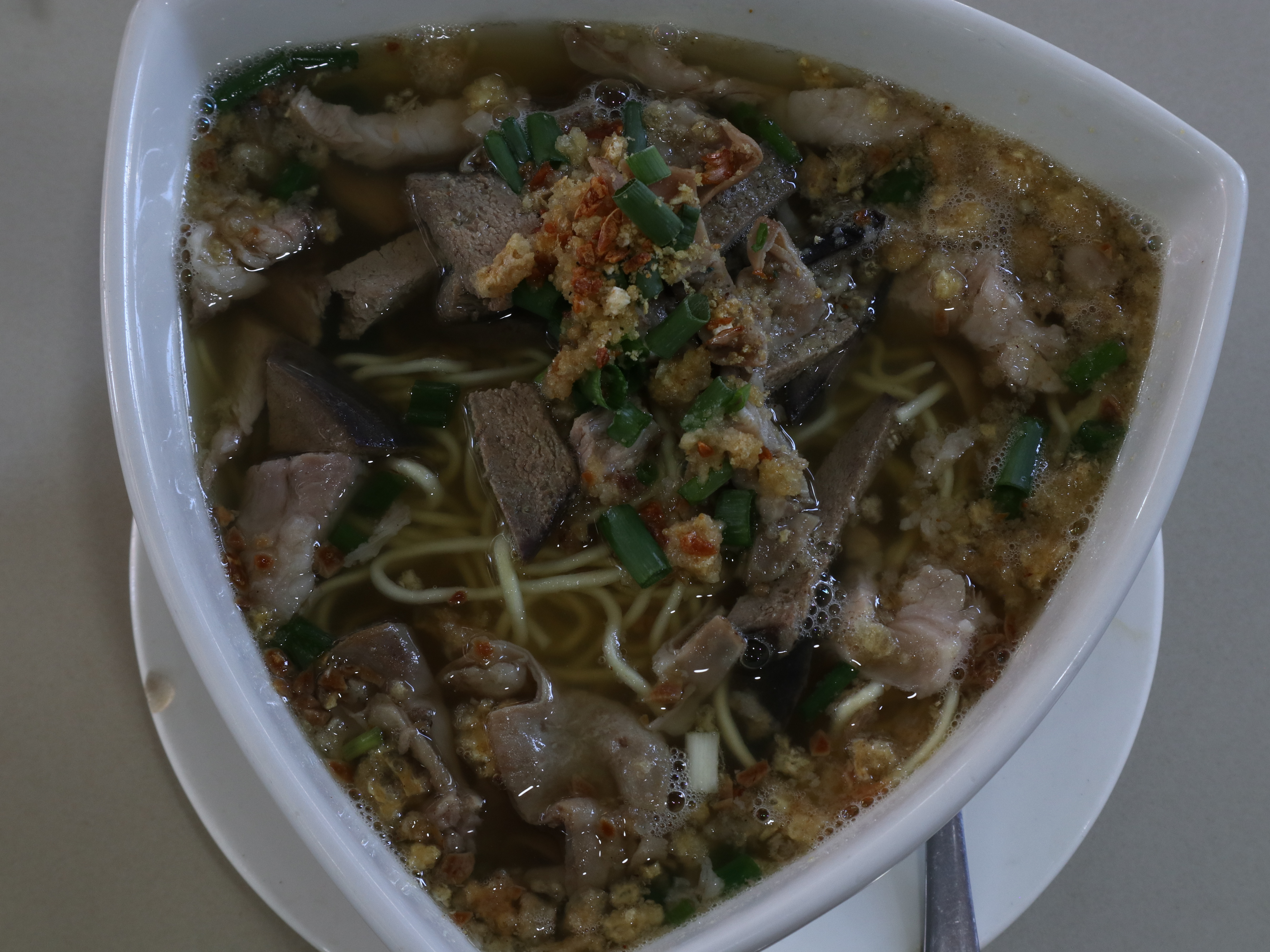
A bowl of Batchoy served inside the public market

The origin of Batchoy is traced to the public market, with multiple accounts claiming credit for its creation. It is believed to have been created in 1938 by Federico Guilergan Sr., evolving from a playful combination of "bats" and "choy" (from chop suey). However, Inggo's Batchoy also claims to be the first batchoy shop in La Paz, established in 1922 at the La Paz Public Market, predating Deco's La Paz Batchoy Shop by 16 years. Teodorico "Ted" Lepura further popularized the dish with Ted's Oldtimer Lapaz Batchoy, founded in 1945. The dish's name "batchoy" is believed to originate from Hokkien Chinese, meaning "meat soup" or "minced meat."
