= Oyster vermicelli =

Taiwanese noodle soup

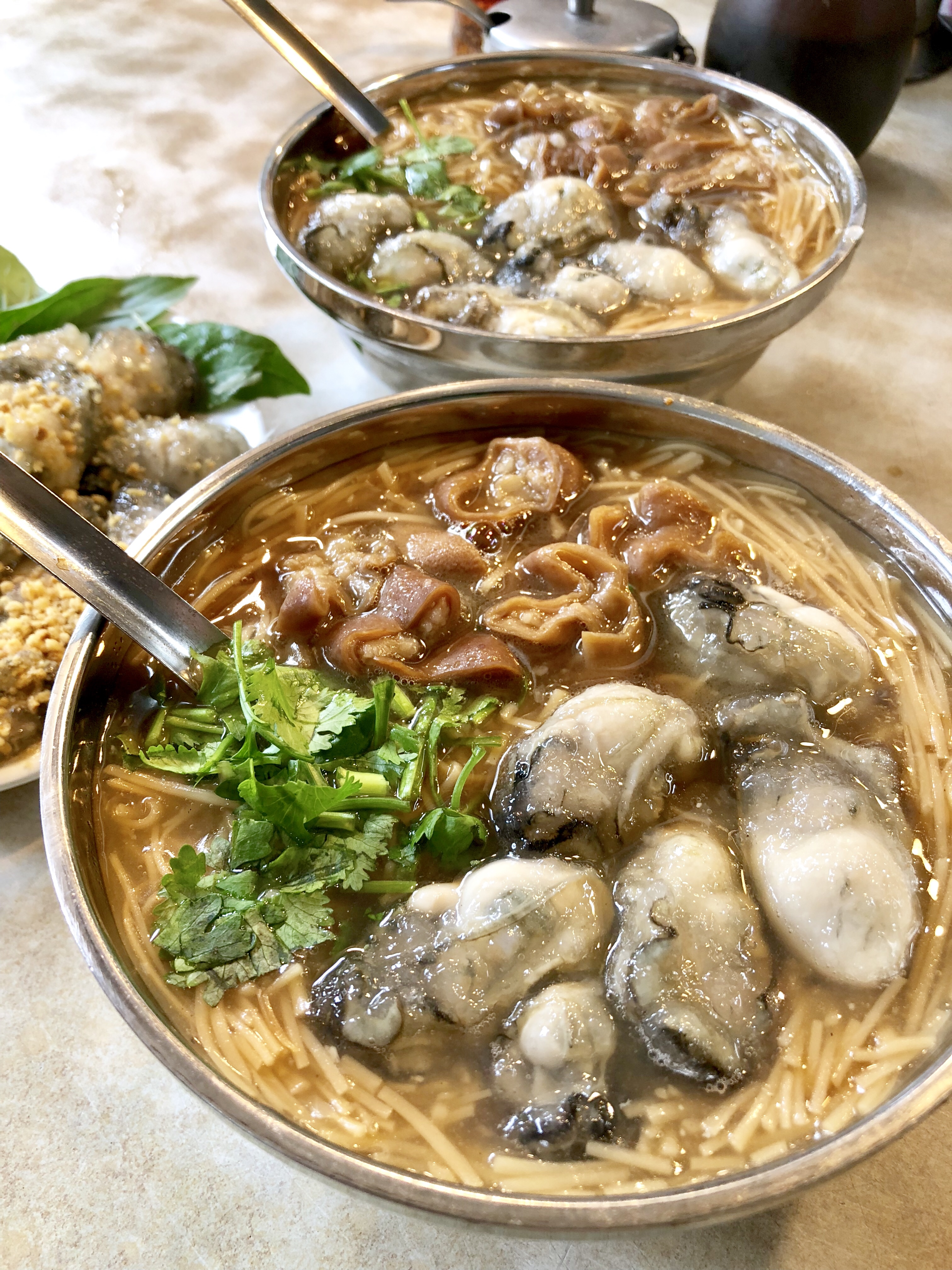
- A bowl of oyster vermicelli in Taipei, Taiwan
- Alternative names: 蚵仔麵線
- Type: Vermicelli soup
- Course: Main course, snack
- Place of origin: Taiwan
- Serving temperature: hot
- Main ingredients: Oyster, misua, flour

Oyster vermicelli (traditional Chinese: 蚵仔麵線; Taiwanese Hokkien: ô-á mī-sòaⁿ) is a noodle soup originating in Taiwan. Its main ingredients are oysters and misua (Chinese vermicelli). One of the famous places serving this is in Dihua Street, Dadaocheng, Taipei. A tan-brown variety of vermicelli used for this dish is made primarily with wheat flour and salt, and gains its unique colour due to a steaming process that darkens the sugars in the dough, allowing it to be cooked for longer periods without breaking down.

An alternative is vermicelli with large intestine, in which oysters are substituted with small segments of pig's large intestine.

== Gallery ==
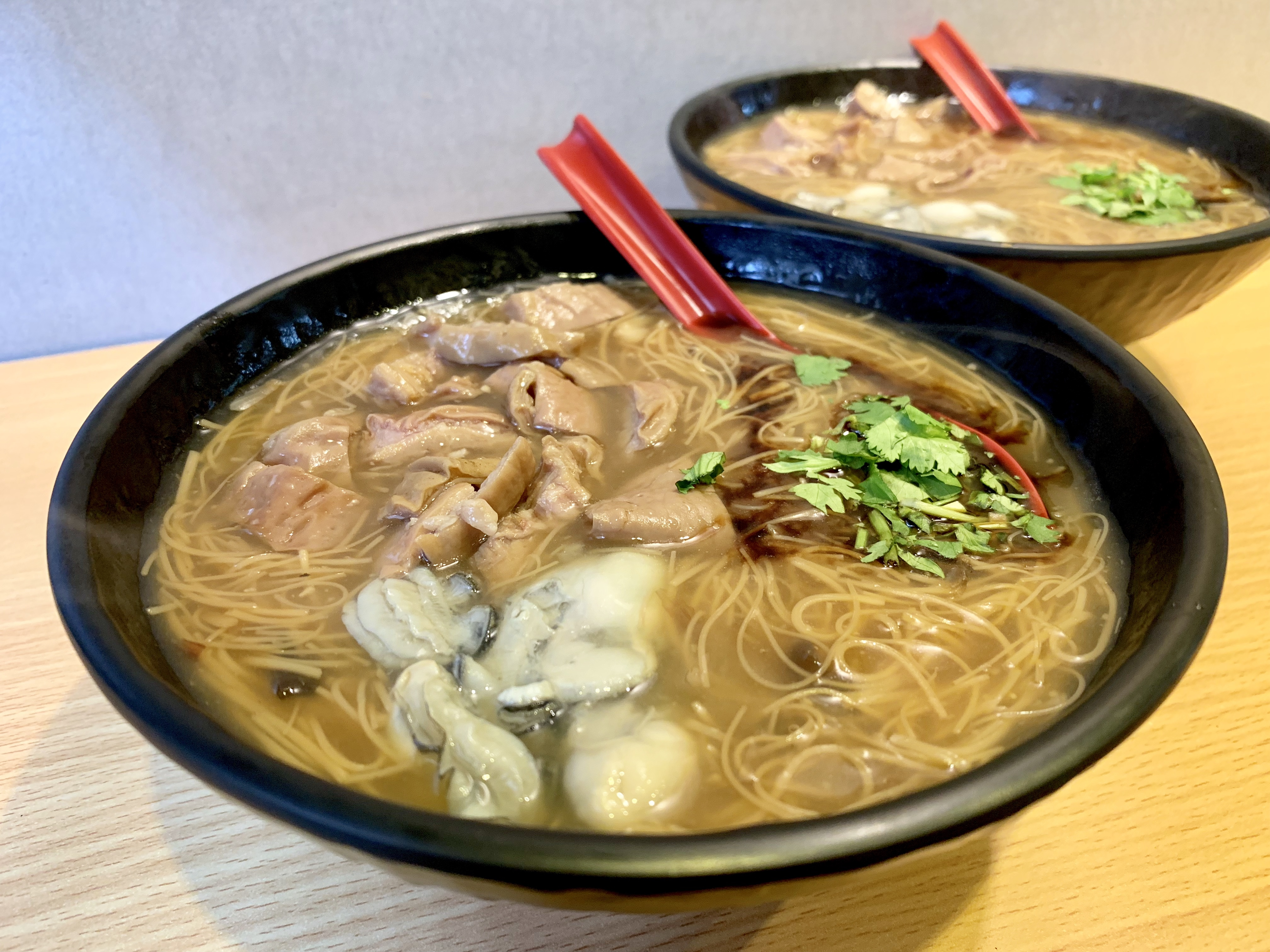

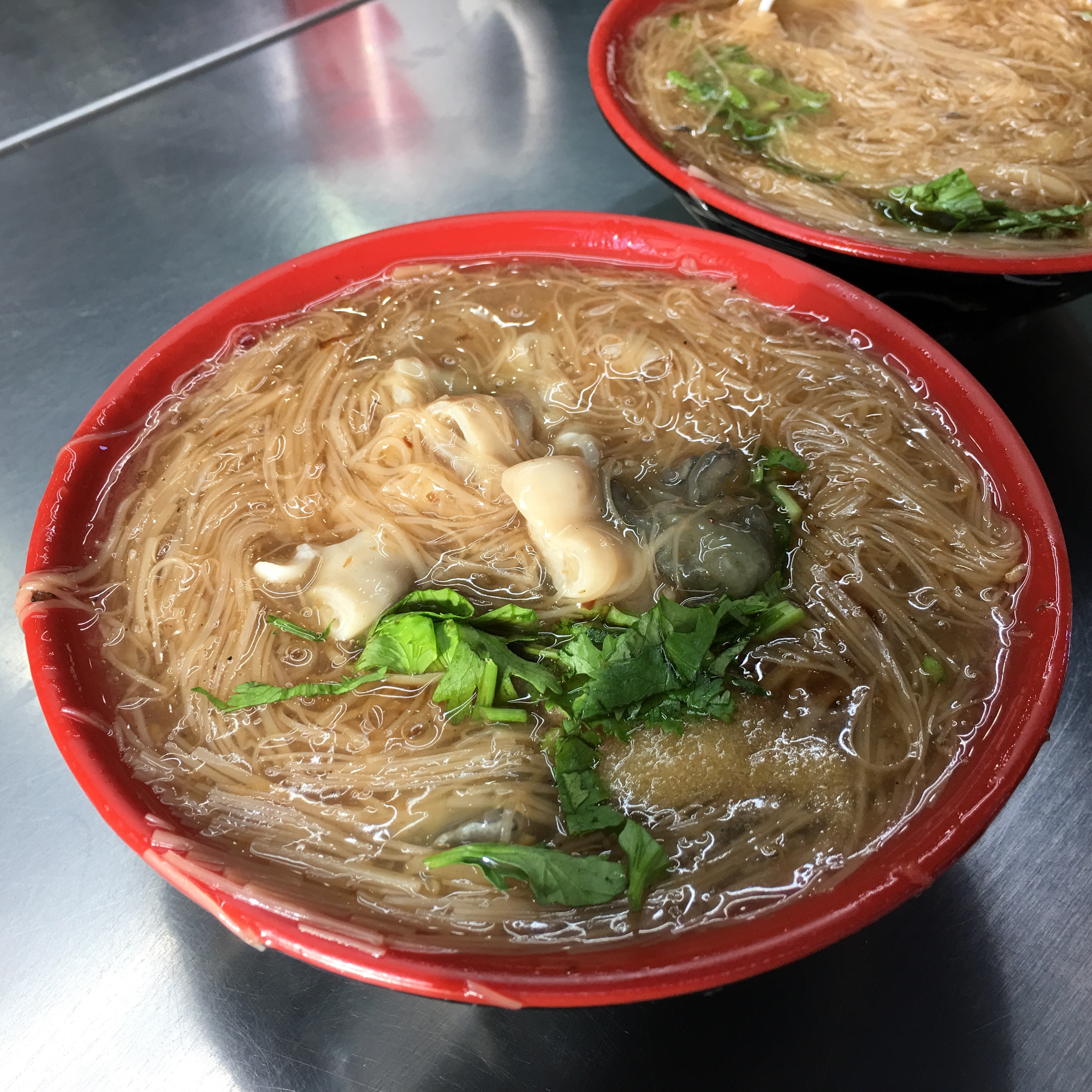

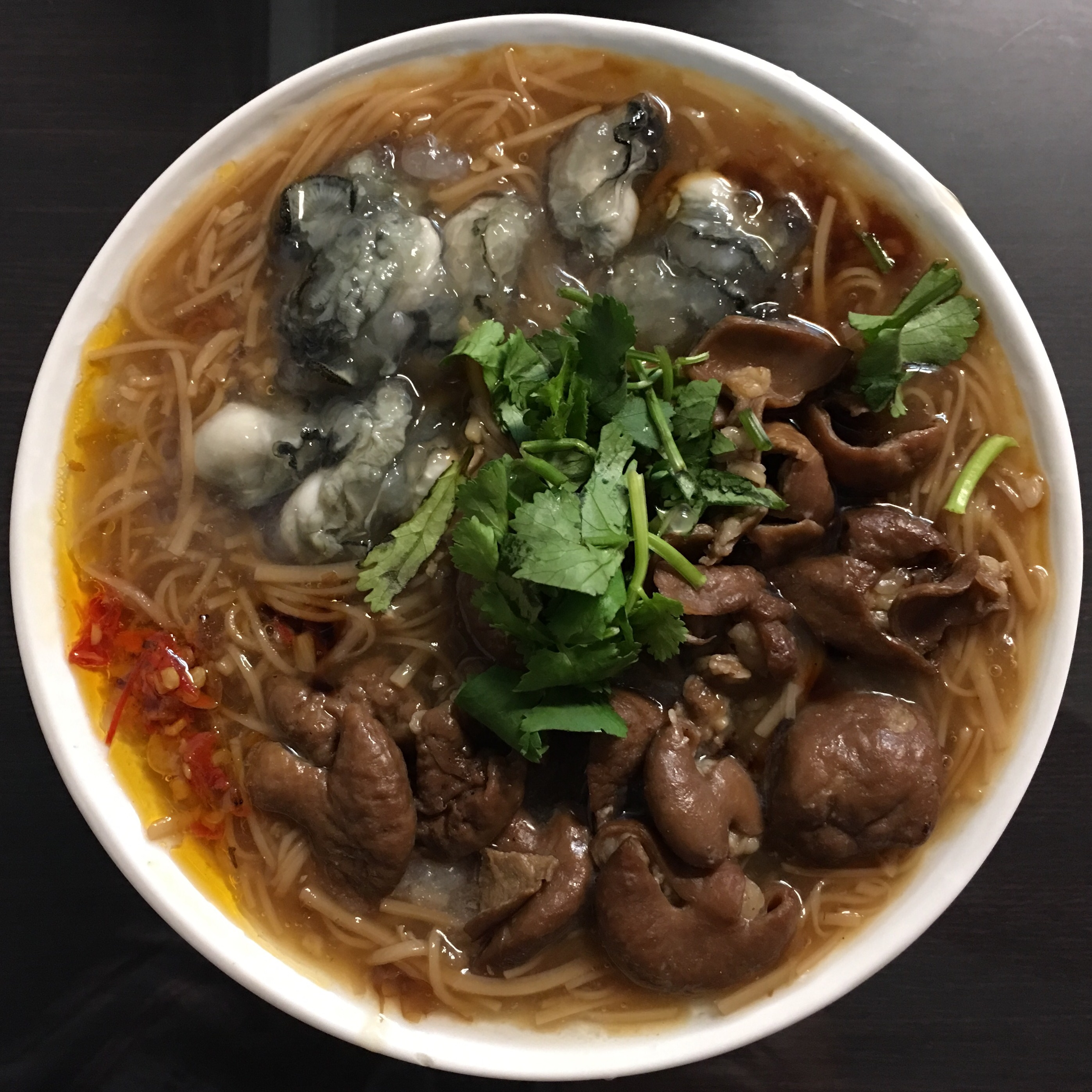

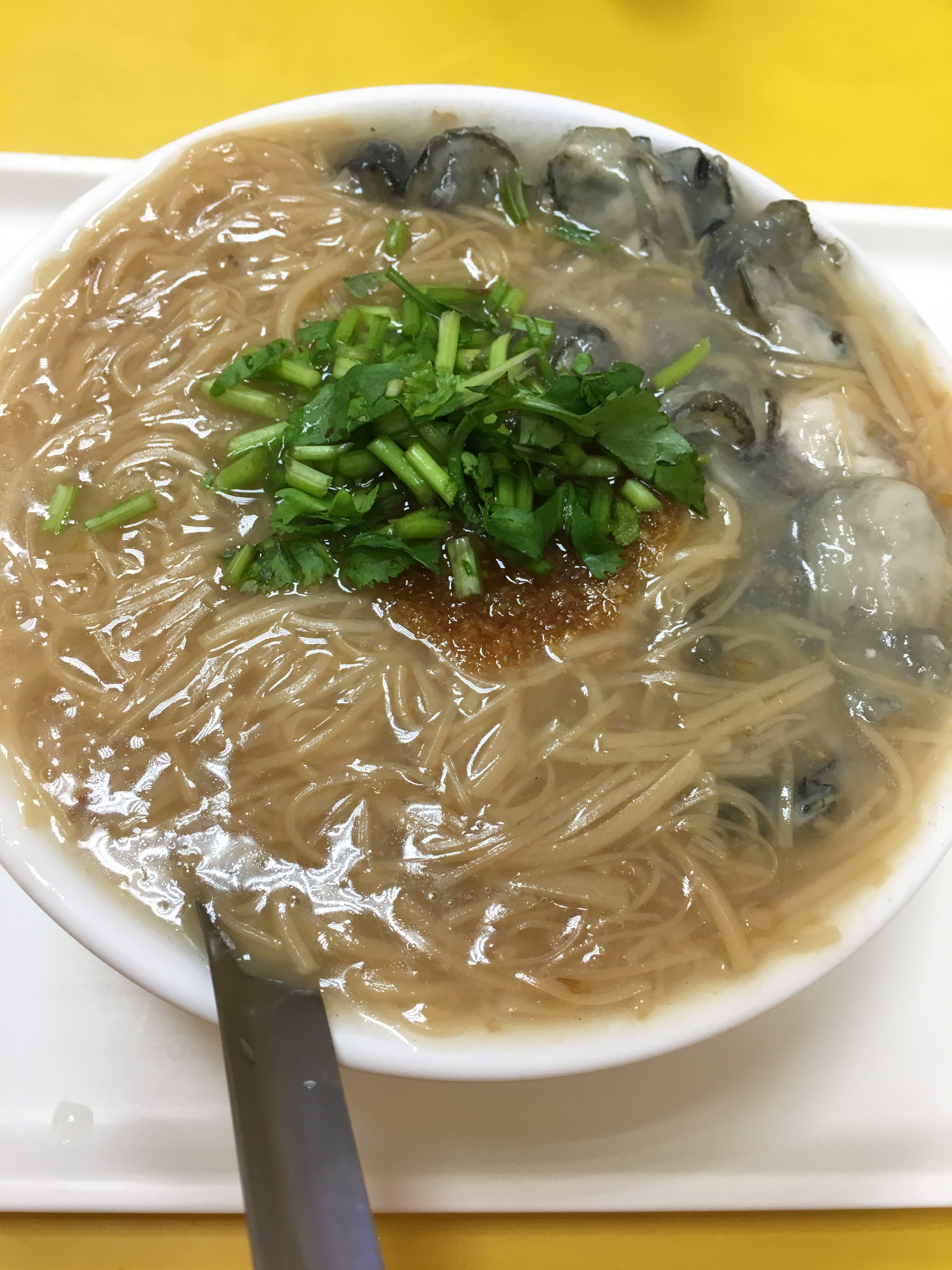

== See also ==
- Chinese noodles
- List of noodle dishes
- List of seafood dishes
- Taiwanese cuisine
- Night markets in Taiwan
