= La Paz Church (Iloilo) =

Roman Catholic church in Iloilo City, Philippines

- Our Lady of Peace and Good Voyage Parish Church
- Parokya ng Mahal na Birhen ng Kapayapaan at Mabuting Paglalakbay (Filipino); Parroquia de Nuestra Señora de la Paz y Buena Viaje (Spanish)
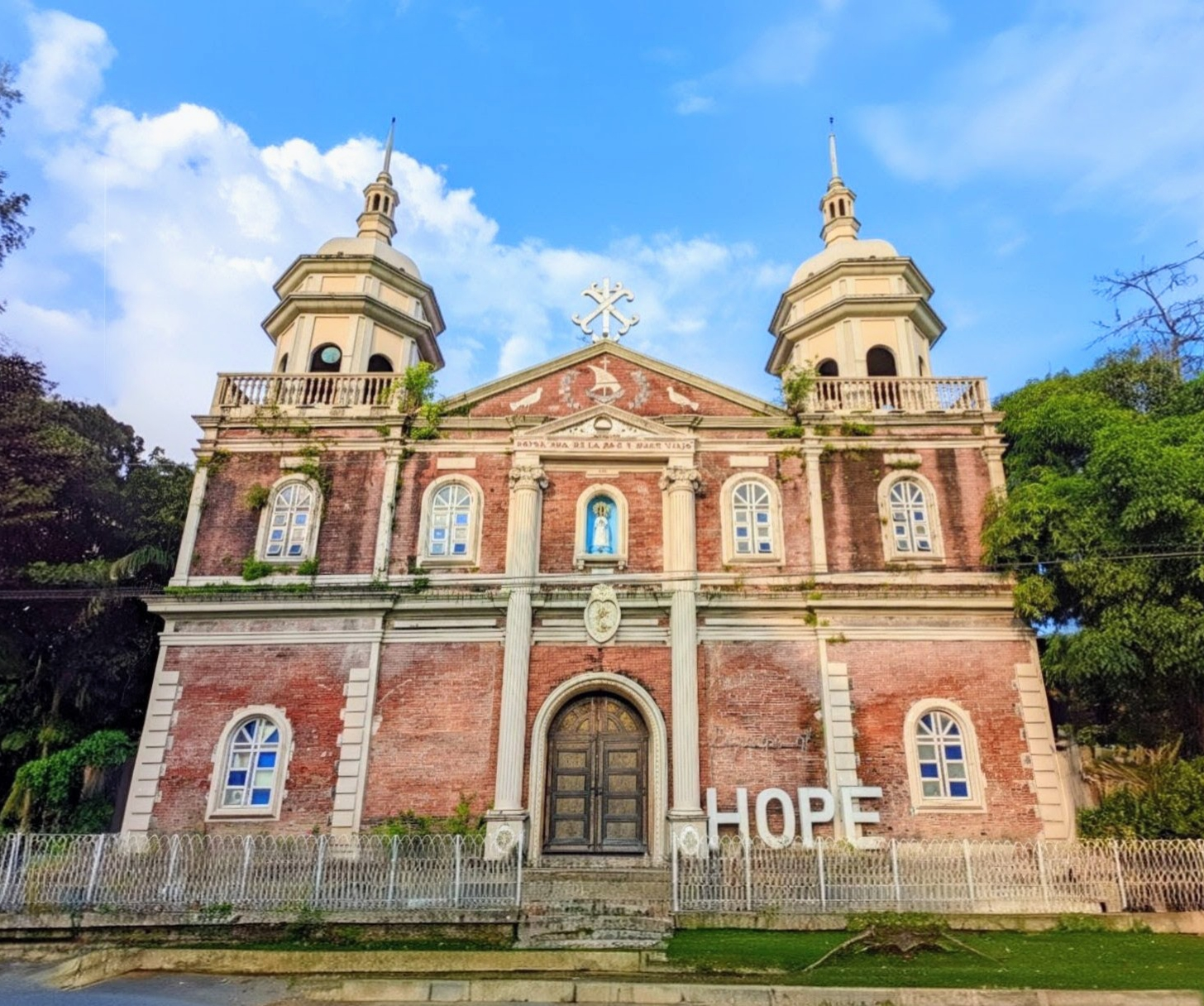
- Church facade in November 2025

- Location in the Visayas Location in the Philippines
- 10°42′45.26″N 122°34′17.68″E
- Location: La Paz, Iloilo City
- Country: Philippines
- Language(s): Hiligaynon, English
- Denomination: Roman Catholic

History
- Status: Parish church
- Founded: 1870; 156 years ago
- Dedication: Our Lady of Peace and Good Voyage
- Consecrated: May 24, 1995; 31 years ago

Architecture
- Functional status: Active
- Architectural type: Church building
- Style: Neoclassical
- Groundbreaking: 1870; 156 years ago
- Completed: 1895; 131 years ago

Specifications
- Materials: Red Brick, Limestone

Administration
- Archdiocese: Jaro
- Parish: Our Lady of Peace and Good Voyage

Clergy
- Priest(s): Rev. Fr. Bernabe Tutana, Jr.

Our Lady of Peace and Good Voyage Parish Church, commonly known as La Paz Church, is a Roman Catholic church located in the district of La Paz in Iloilo City, Philippines. It is under the Archdiocese of Jaro.

== History ==
La Paz Church was initially established as a visita of the Our Lady of Candles Parish in Jaro. Friars of the Augustinian Order managed the church, which was one of two parishes handed to them (the other being San Jose Placer Church) in exchange for Jaro.

In 1870, La Paz Church was established as an independent parish, with Fr. Candido Gonzales serving as its first parish priest. Fr. Gonzales initiated the construction of a convent and a place of worship made of wood and bricks. Between 1870 and 1874, he began building the colonial stone church, which was completed in 1895 under the leadership of Fr. Mariano Ysar.

Despite surviving the ruins of the Second World War and the devastating 1948 earthquake that destroyed the Oton Church, the church sustained significant damage. Reconstruction efforts were spearheaded by Fr. Melecio Fegarido in the 1960s, and the restored structure was consecrated on May 24, 1995.

The parish was served by fourteen Augustinian priests before its administration was turned over to the secular clergy in 1910. Over the decades, the church became the mother parish to several daughter parishes in La Paz and Lapuz districts, namely Our Lady of the Assumption Church (1952), St. Clement's Church (1962), Our Lady of Fatima Church (1972), and San Lorenzo Church (1992).

== Architecture ==
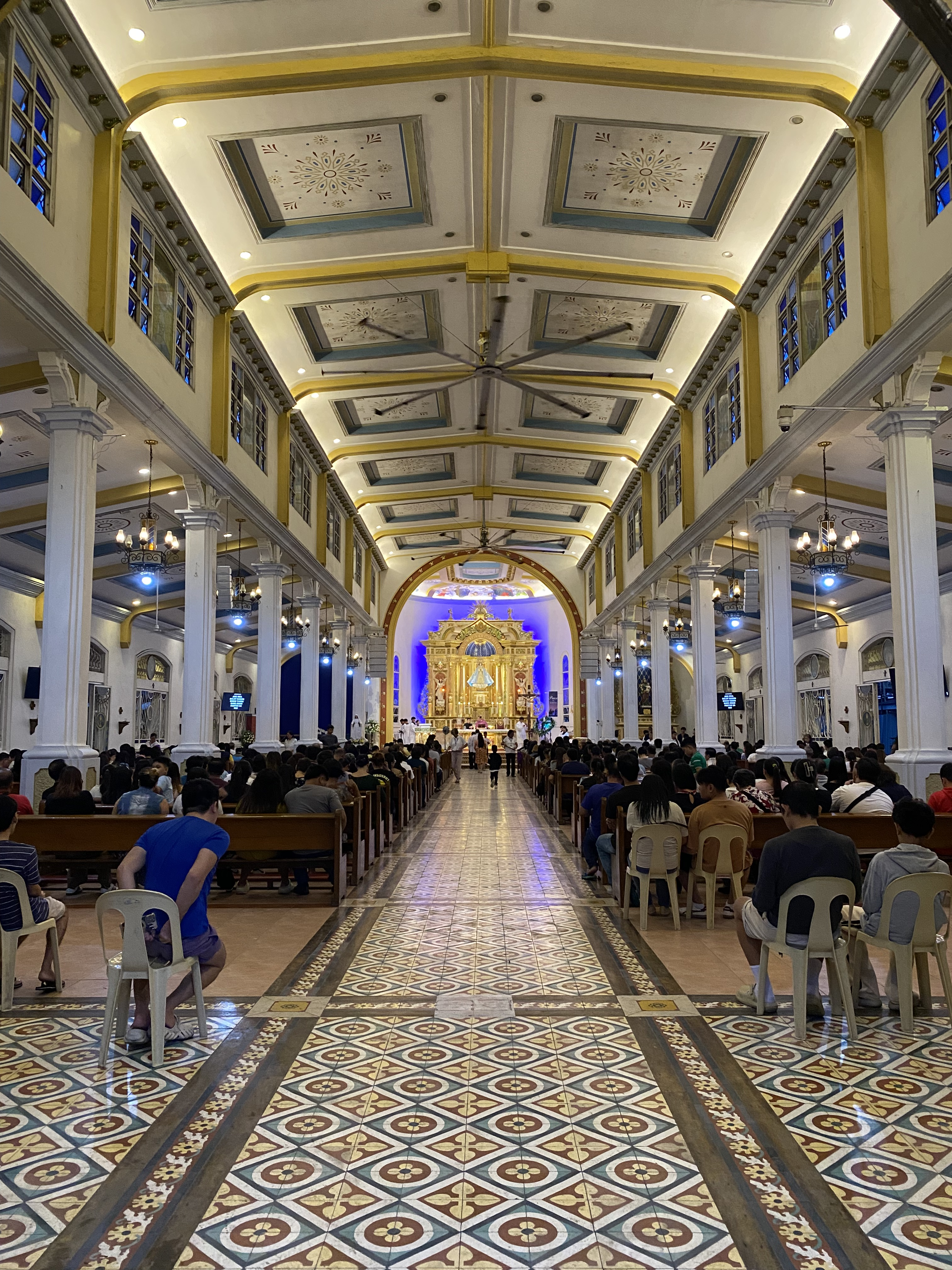
Central nave

The neoclassical La Paz Church, resembling the San Jose Placer Parish Church, features symmetrical bell towers flanking a facade of red-brown bricks with white accents. The facade is divided horizontally by cornices into panels with arched apertures and pilasters, topped by a pediment with carvings of a sailboat, flora, fauna, and the Chi-Rho symbol at its apex. The octagonal belfries are capped with domes, lanterns, and crosses.

Two Ionic columns from 1970 vertically divide the facade, framing the main arched doorway, a heart-shaped low relief of a holy figure, and the niche of the patron saint. The lintel bears the inscription "NSTRA. SRA. DE LA PAZ Y BUENA VIAJE" beneath an ornamental pediment.

The interior has three naves without transepts. The main nave is bordered by pillars supporting a clerestory of windows, while the ceiling is decorated with rafters and repeating cross motifs, echoed in the side naves.
