= La Paz Plaza (Iloilo) =

Public plaza in La Paz, Iloilo City

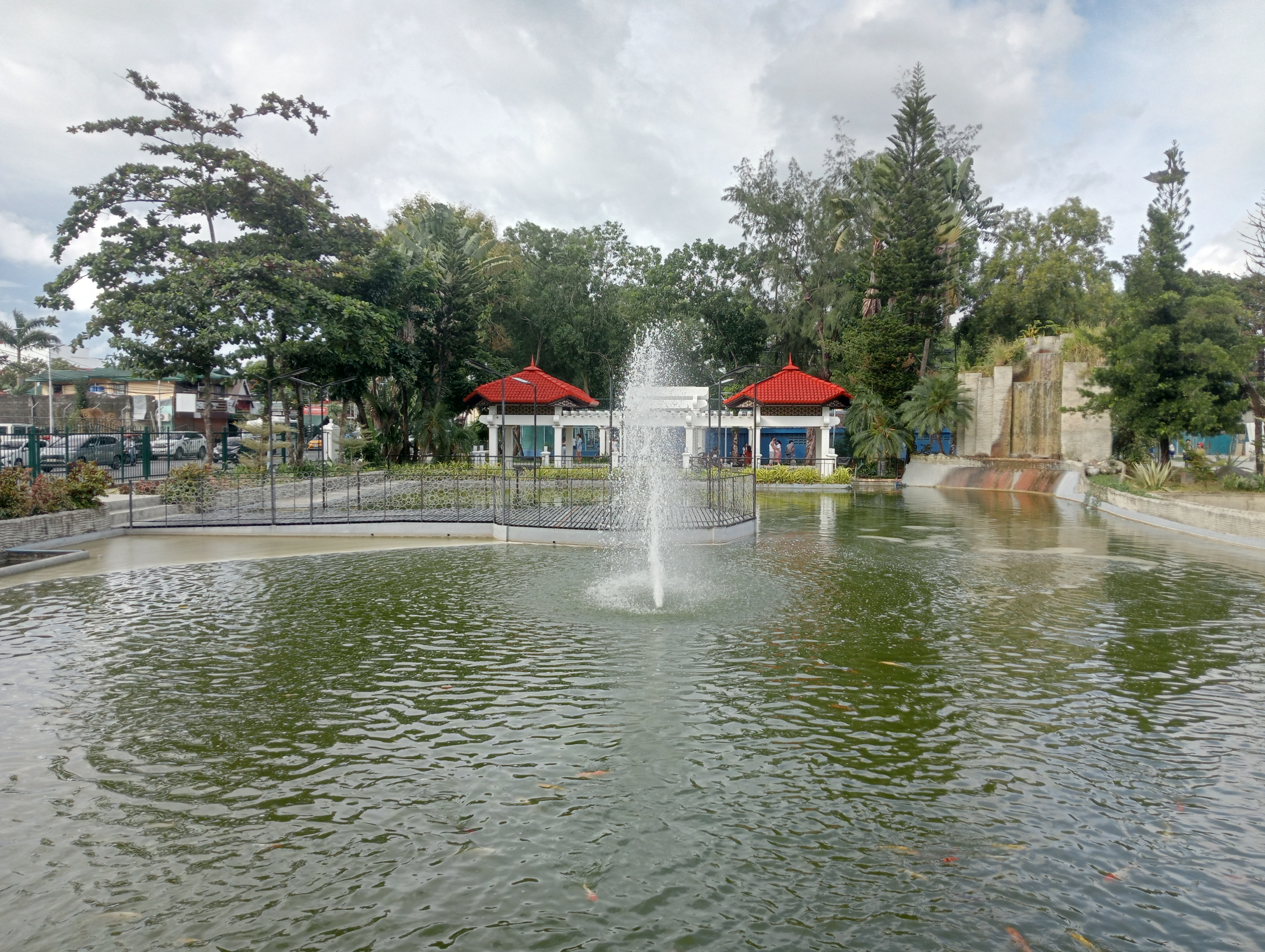
- Koi pond in the plaza
- Interactive map of La Paz Plaza
- Type: Urban park, town square
- Location: La Paz, Iloilo City, Philippines
- Coordinates: 10°42′42.5988″N 122°34′14.7324″E
- Area: 3.5 hectares (8.6 acres)
- Created: 1922

La Paz Plaza, also known as Plaza La Paz, is an urban park and town square located in the district of La Paz in Iloilo City, Philippines. It is the largest among six district plazas in Iloilo City, with a land area of about 3.5 hectares (35,000 m^{2}). The redevelopment of the plaza was inaugurated on March 18, 1998, by the then-President Fidel V. Ramos.

The plaza features a spacious football field, tennis courts, a koi lagoon, and a butterfly garden. In front of the plaza stands the red-brick La Paz Church, an architectural gem that adds to the district's charm and historical significance. It is also the only plaza in the city with a football field and a lake.

== Gallery ==
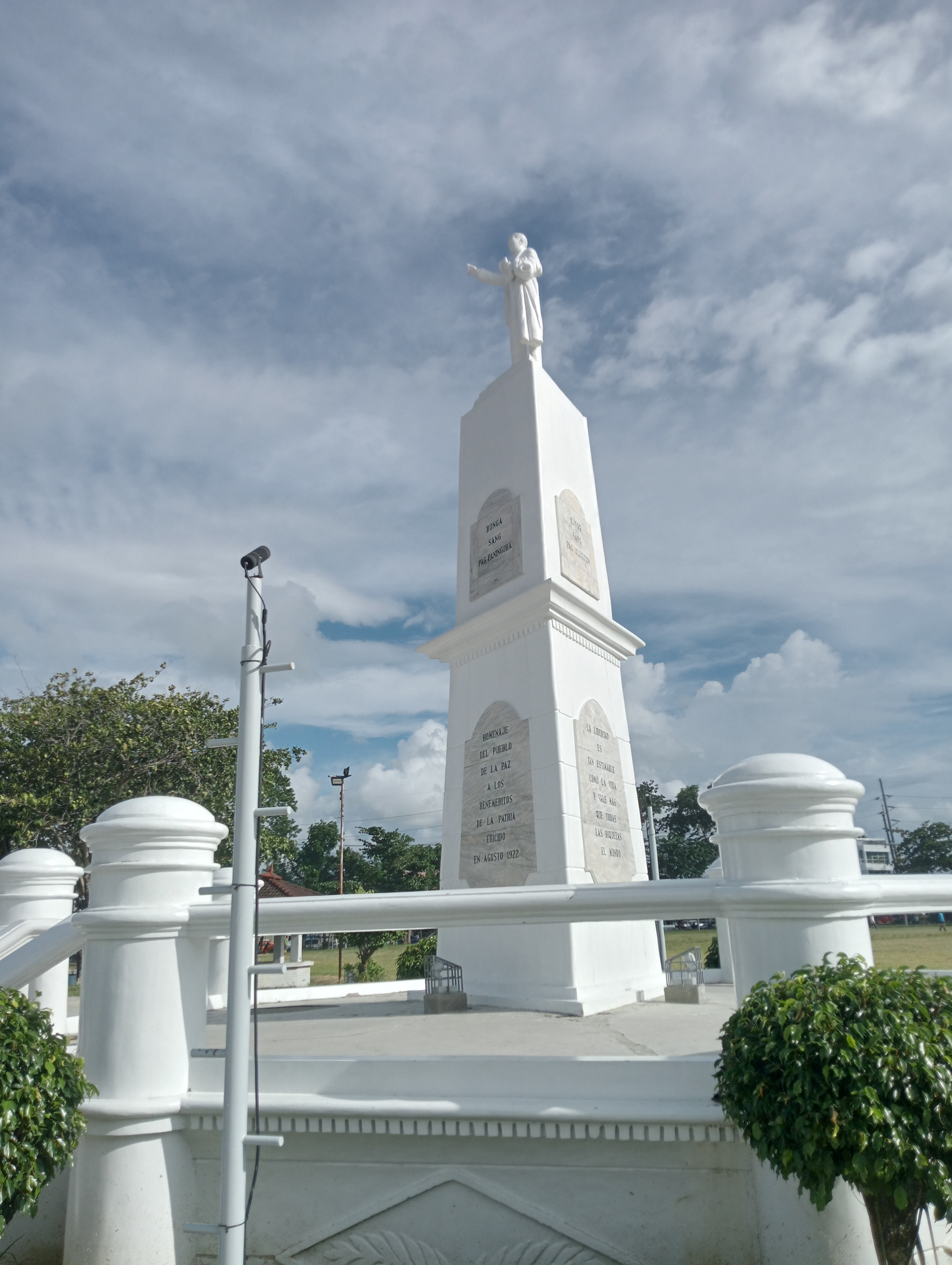
Jose Rizal Monument

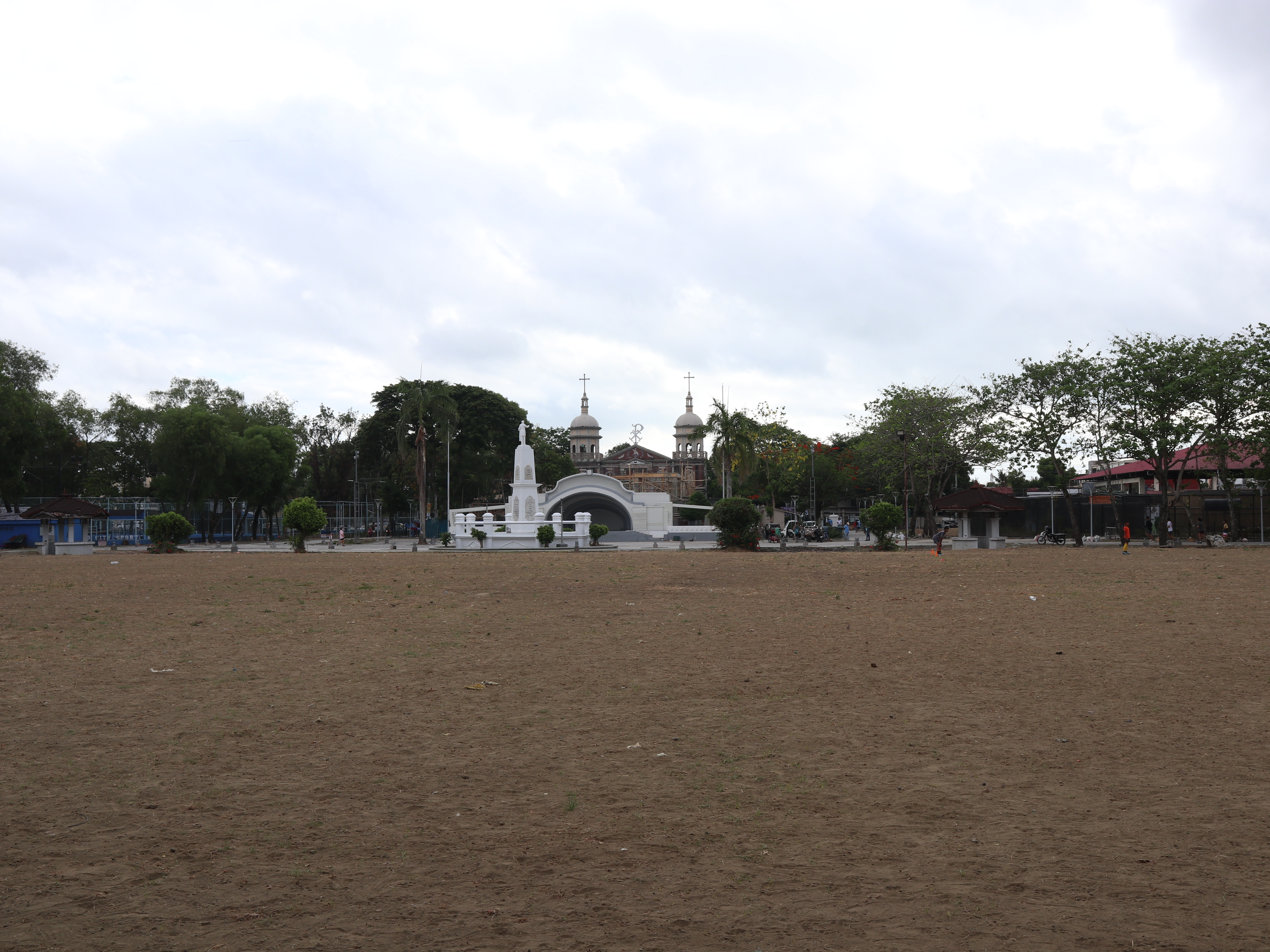
Football Field

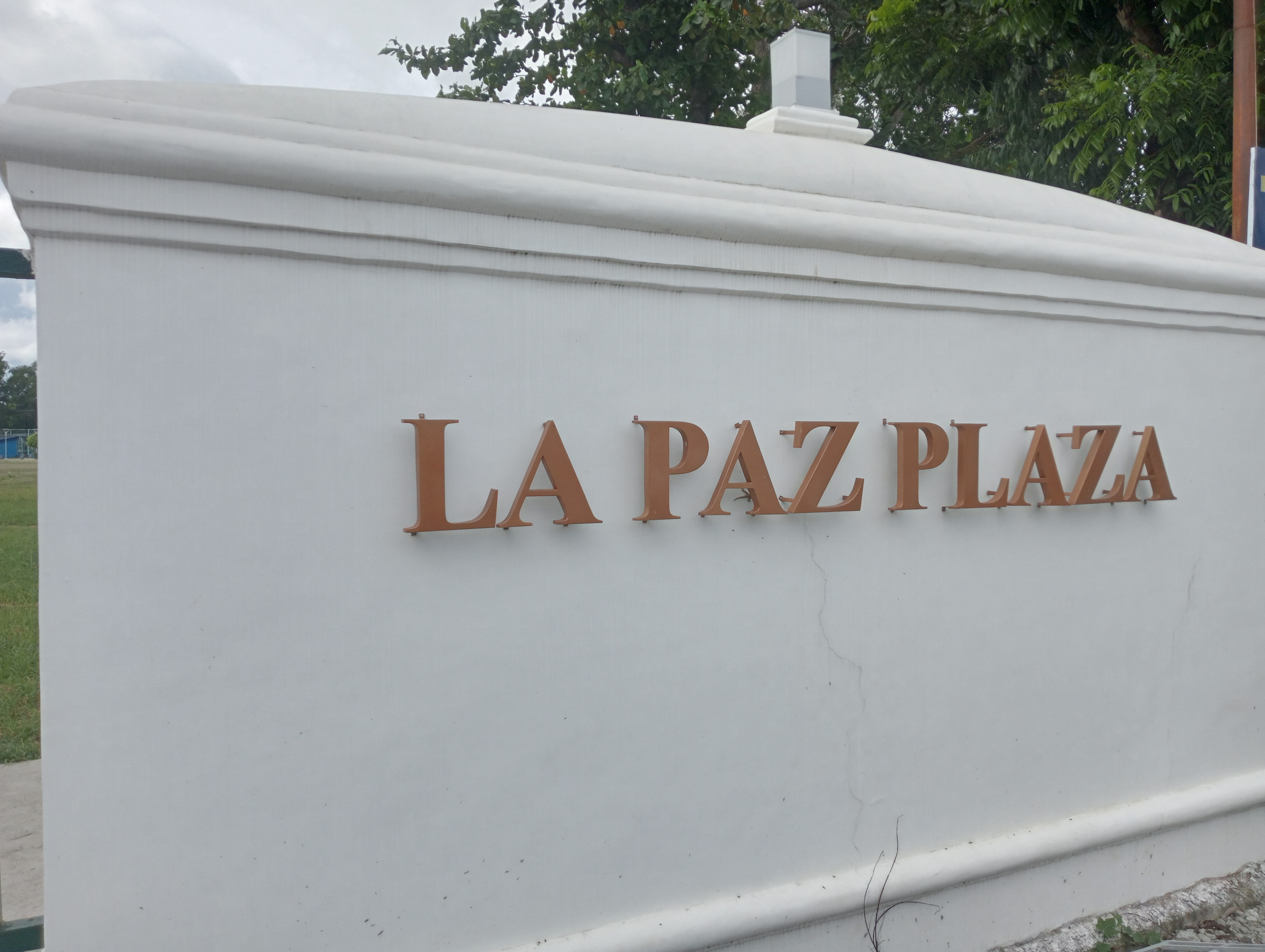
La Paz Plaza Marker

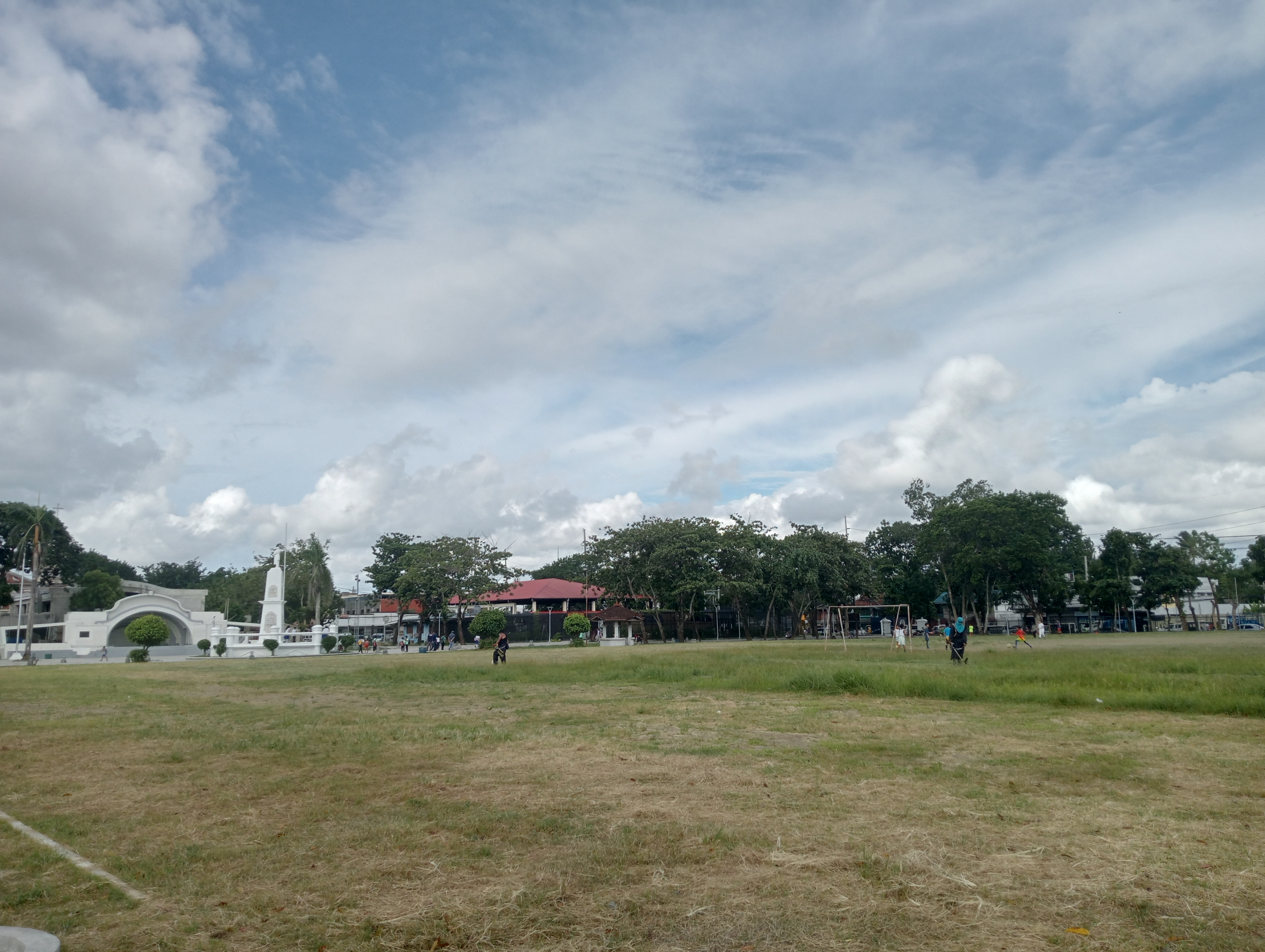
La Paz Plaza Open Field

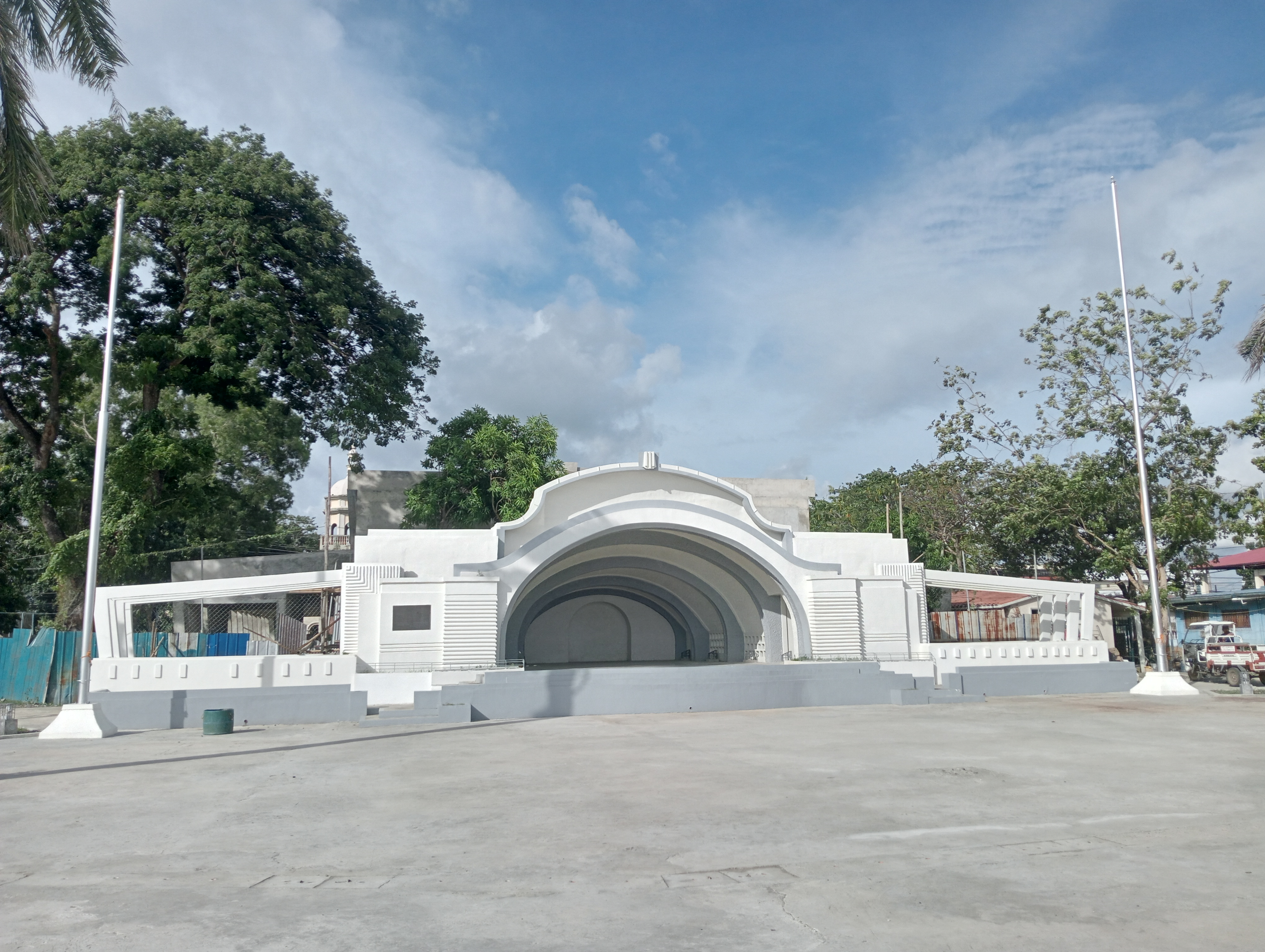
La Paz Stage
