= Kinalas =

Philippine noodle dish

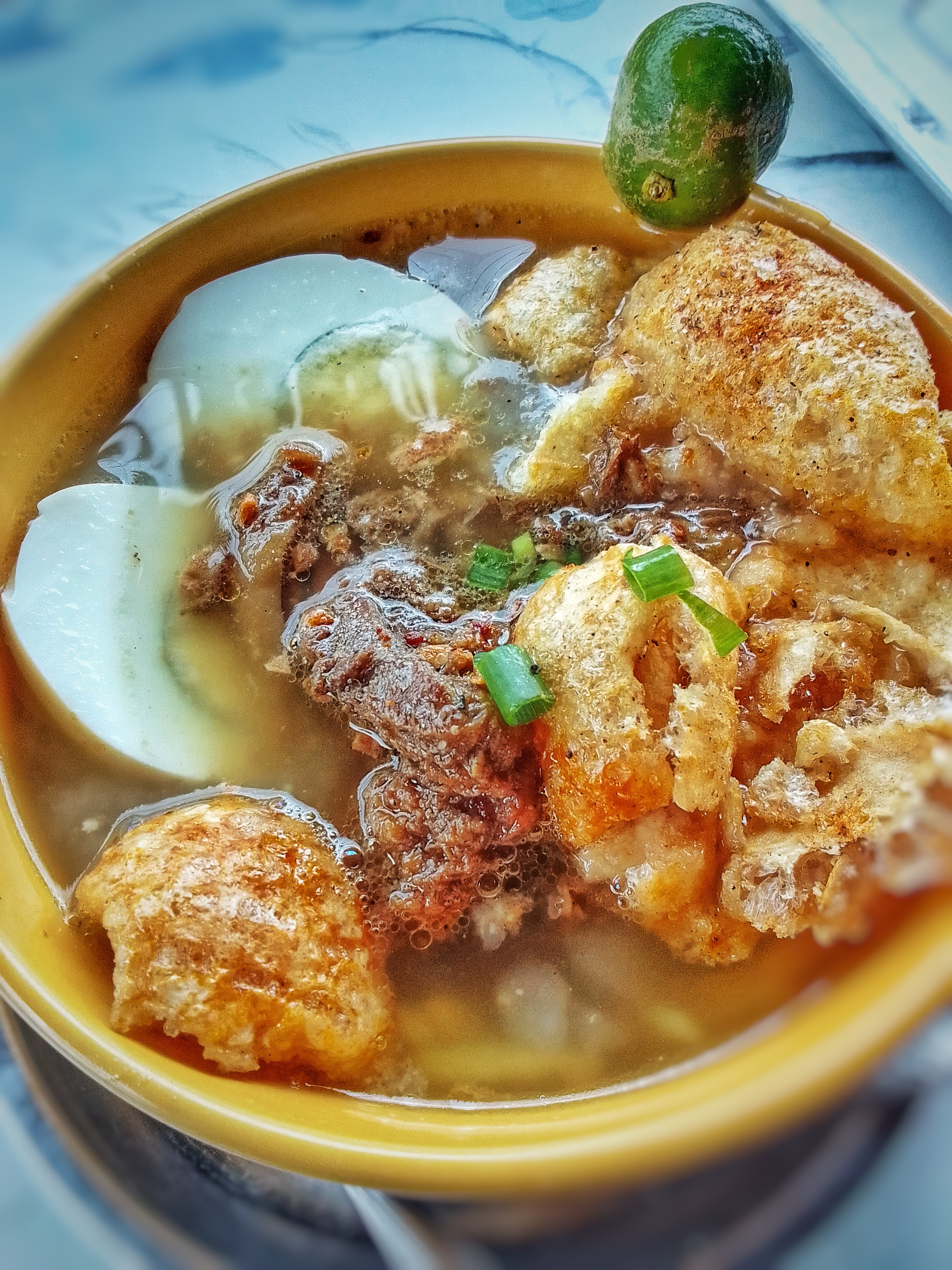
- Kinalas dish from Bicol Region
- Alternative names: Pancit kinalas
- Course: Main dish
- Place of origin: Philippines
- Region or state: Bicol Region
- Serving temperature: Hot
- Main ingredients: Noodles, pork or beef head meat, pork or beef brains, spices
- Similar dishes: Batchoy

Kinalas is a Bicol dish consisting of noodles (pancit) garnished by scraped meat from pork or beef's head and other parts, enhanced with a thick deep-brown sauce coming from the brains of a cow or pig. The dish is further flavored with spices (sili and pepper) and served in hot broth. Boiled egg added is optional.

The name originates from the Bicolano verb kalas, an alternate form of hinglas, meaning "to remove the meat from the bones" usually in preparation for preserving it in salt or brine. The term is attested in the 16th century Vocabulario de la lengua Bicol by Maŕcos de Lisboa.

== See also ==
- Batchoy
- Goto (food)
- List of noodle dishes
