= La Paz, Iloilo City =

District of Iloilo City, Philippines

La Paz
- District of Iloilo City
- Aerial view of La Paz

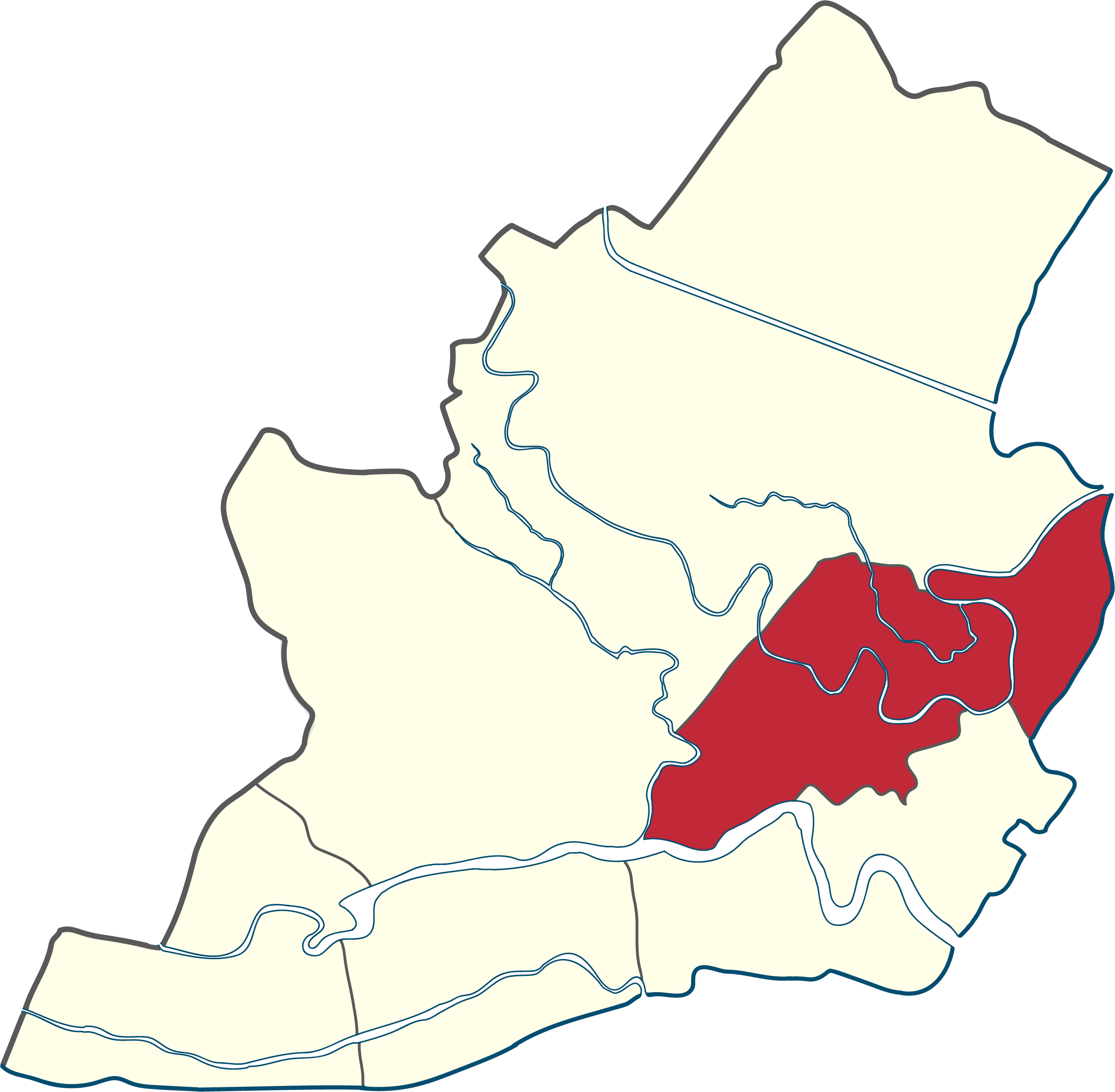
- Location within Iloilo City
- Interactive map of La Paz
- Location in the Philippines La Paz (Philippines)
- Coordinates: 10°43′12″N 122°34′41″E
- Country: Philippines
- Region: Western Visayas (Region VI)
- Province: Iloilo (geographically only)
- City: Iloilo City
- Congressional District: Lone district of Iloilo City
- Established: 1584
- Merged into city: August 25, 1937
- Barangays: 25 (see Barangays)

Government
  - District ABC President: Ruby Ann Geanga

Area
  - Total: 11.33 km^{2} (4.37 sq mi)

Population (2024 census)
  - Total: 58,098
  - Density: 5,128/km^{2} (13,280/sq mi)
- Demonym(s): Lapazeño; Lapaznon
- Time zone: UTC+8 (Philippine Standard Time)
- ZIP code: 5000
- Area code: 33
- Patron saint: Nuestra Señora de la Paz y Buen Viaje (Our Lady of Peace and Good Voyage)
- Feast day: May 24
- Native languages: Hiligaynon

La Paz ([laˈpas]) (colloquial spelling: Lapaz) is a district in Iloilo City, Philippines. It is the third-largest district by geographical area, after Jaro and Mandurriao. According to the 2024 census, it has a population of 58,098 people.

La Paz is known for being the birthplace of the popular Filipino noodle soup dish, La Paz Batchoy. La Paz Public Market, considered the exact birthplace of La Paz Batchoy. The district is also popular for its district plaza, the La Paz Plaza, which is the largest among the six district plazas in Iloilo City.

In the past, La Paz was known as Ilawod, which means "sea/wet land," along with Jaro, which was referred to as Ilaya, meaning "mountain/dry land."

== History ==
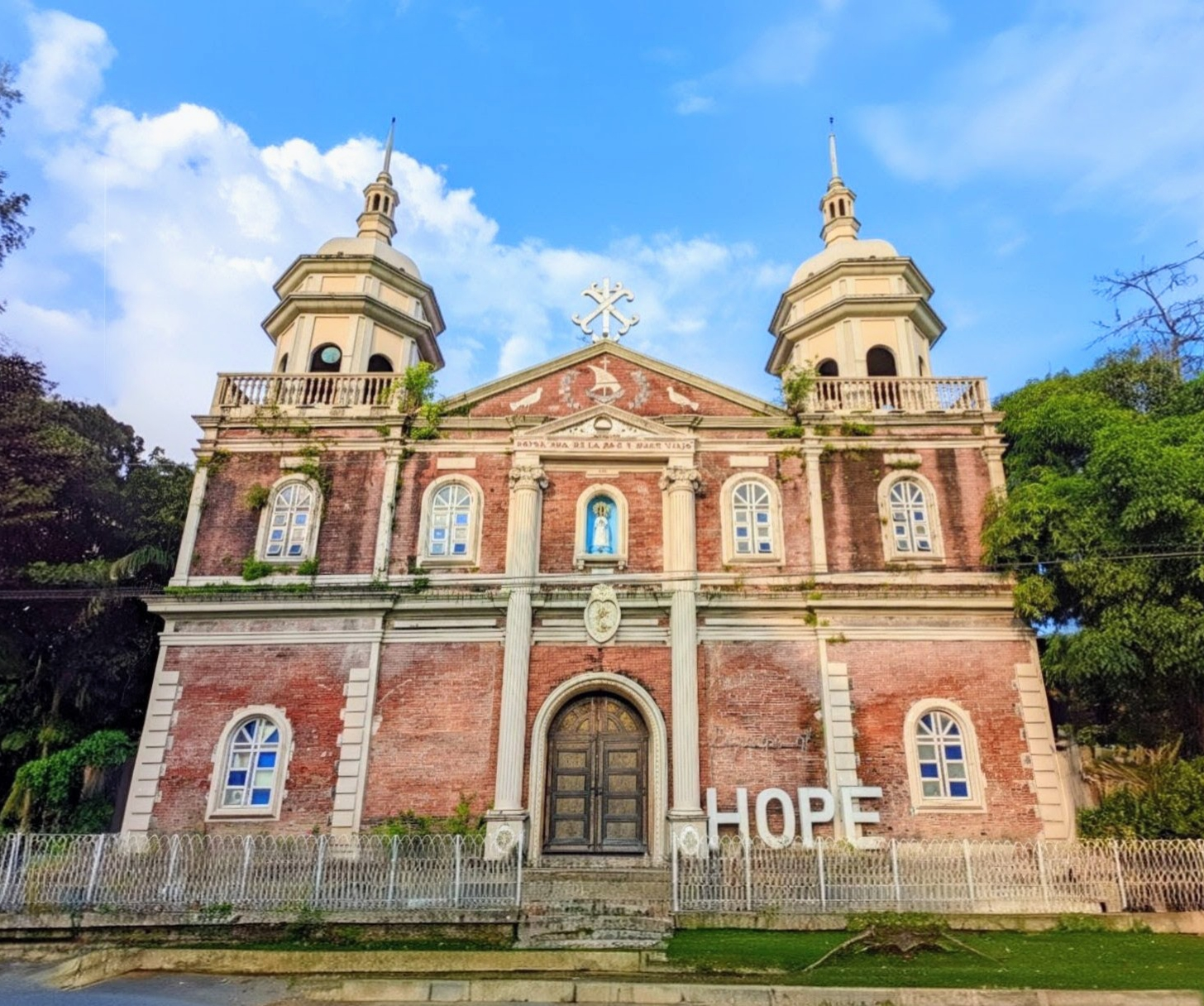
La Paz Church

La Paz traces back to its origins as one of the barrios of Jaro. Initially established in 1584, it was named Bagong Banera at the time. However, it wasn't until 1856 that it gained independence from Jaro and became a separate pueblo (town) known as Lobo. Later on, it was renamed La Paz, meaning "peace" in Spanish, which was derived from its patron saint, Nuestra Señora de la Paz y Buen Viaje (Our Lady of Peace and Good Voyage).

On July 16, 1937, La Paz was legally annexed as a district of Iloilo City, which was formally inaugurated on August 25, 1937, alongside the towns of Arevalo, Mandurriao, and Molo.

In 2008, the sub-district of Lapuz in La Paz gained independence after a resolution was passed by the city council. This move aimed to establish separate police and fire stations for the area.

== Geography ==
La Paz is situated in the middle-eastern part of Iloilo City, around 2.1 kilometres (1.3 mi) from Iloilo City Proper. It is bordered by Jaro to the north, Mandurriao to the west, Molo to the southwest, the City Proper to the south, and Lapuz to the southeast. The district is traversed by the Tigum River and faces Buenavista on Guimaras Island across the Iloilo Strait to the east.

=== Barangays ===
The district of La Paz has a total of 25 barangays.

- Aguinaldo
- Baldoza
- Bantud
- Banuyao
- Burgos-Mabini-Plaza
- Caingin
- Divinagracia
- Gustilo
- Hinactacan
- Ingore
- Jereos
- Laguda
- Lopez Jaena Norte
- Lopez Jaena Sur
- Luna
- MacArthur
- Magdalo
- Magsaysay Village
- Nabitasan
- Railway
- Rizal
- San Isidro
- San Nicolas
- Tabuc Suba
- Ticud

== Culture ==
=== La Paz Batchoy ===
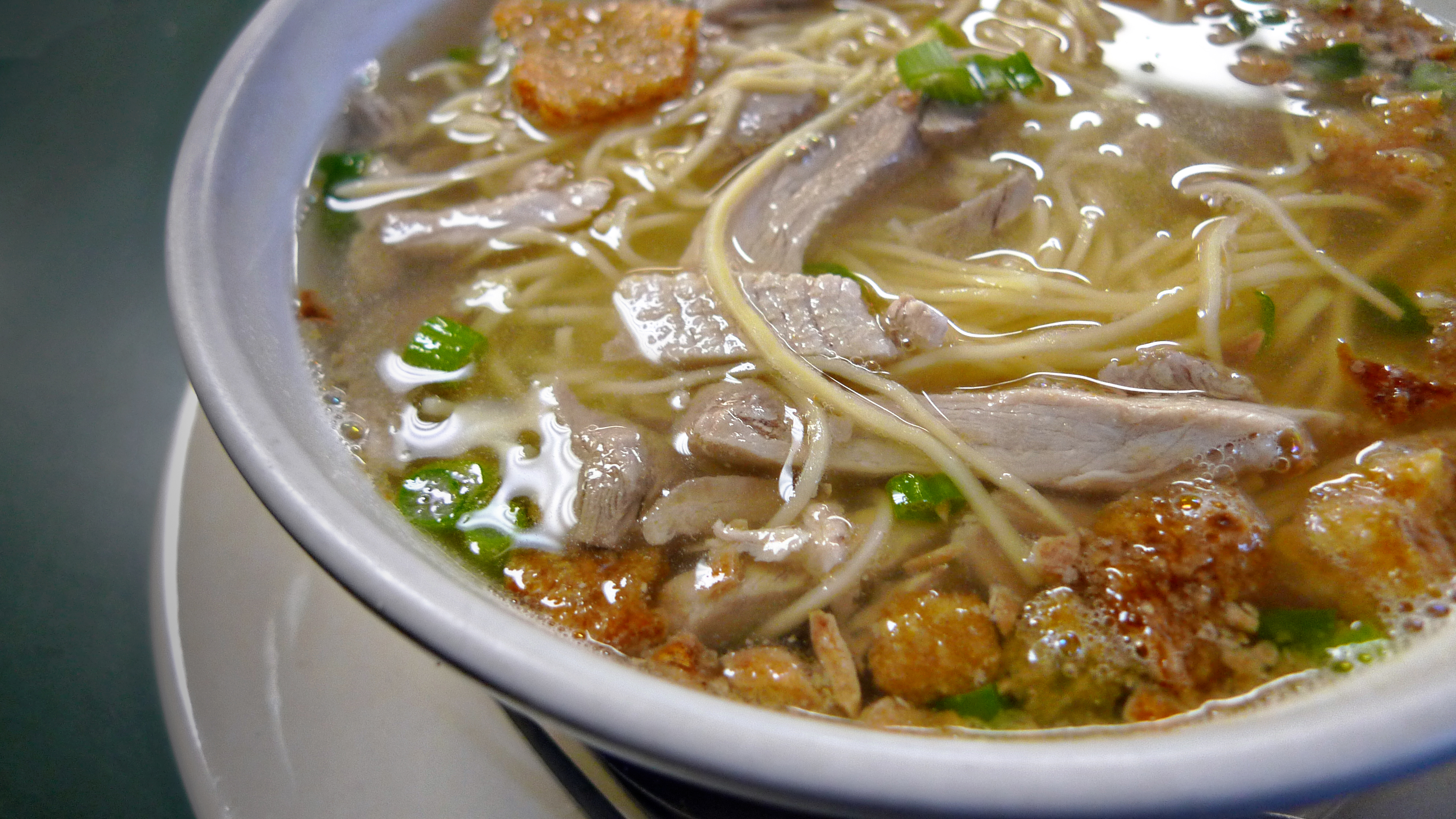
A bowl of La Paz Batchoy

The La Paz Public Market in the district is often referred to as the specific birthplace of the Ilonggo noodle soup dish, La Paz Batchoy. It is a noodle soup made with pork offal, crushed pork cracklings, chicken stock, beef loin and round noodles.

=== La Paz Fiesta ===
In honor of the district patron saint of La Paz, Nuestra Señora de la Paz y Buen Viaje (Our Lady of Peace and Good Voyage), La Paz Fiesta, or the Feast of the Our Lady of Peace and Good Voyage, is held annually in the district on May 24.

== Education ==
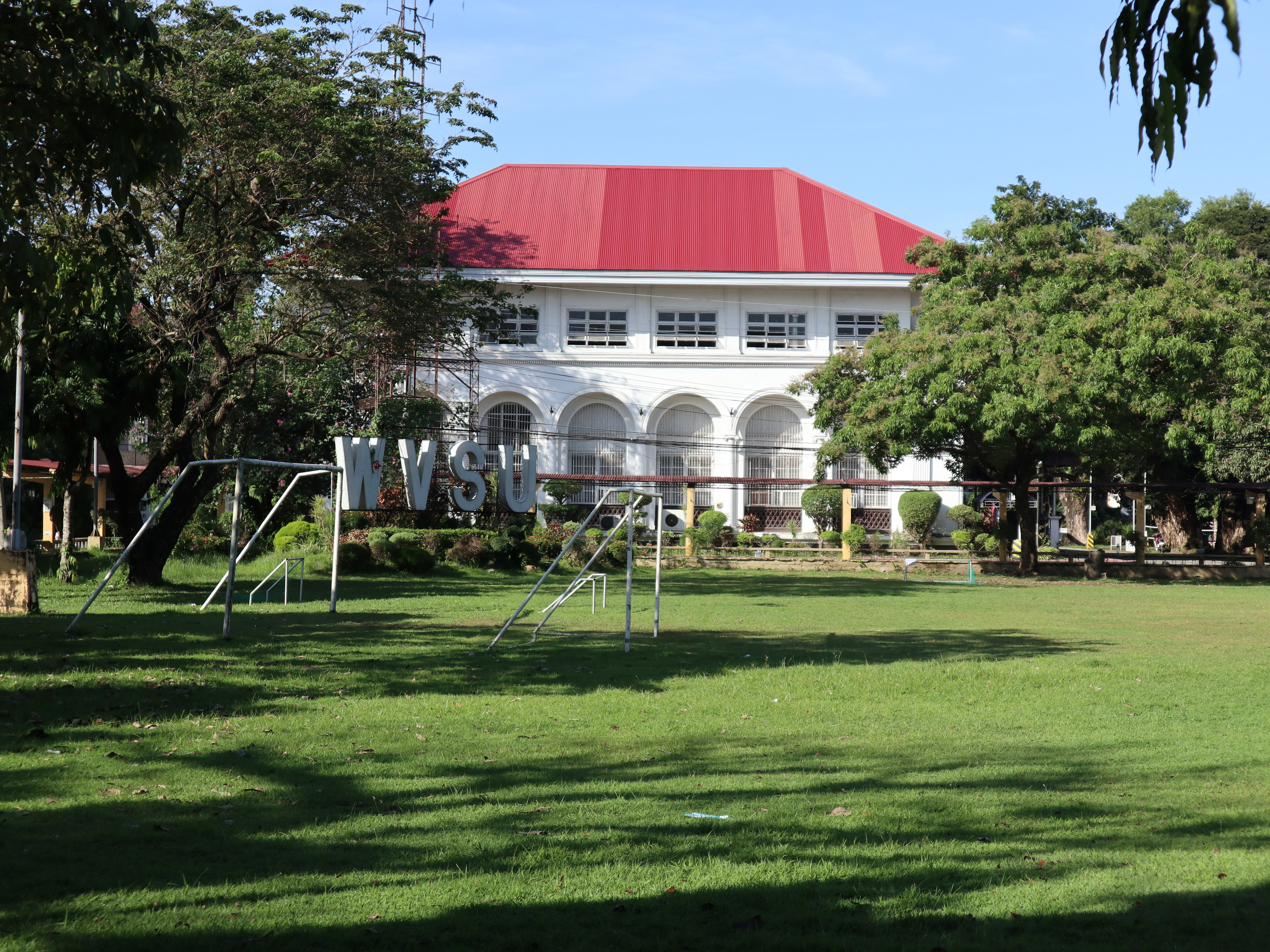
West Visayas State University Quezon Hall

La Paz is home to two of the eight universities in Iloilo City, namely, West Visayas State University and Iloilo Science and Technology University. Other notable schools in the district are Western Institute of Technology, St. Therese – MTC Colleges, Hua Siong College of Iloilo, and Iloilo National High School.

== Transportation ==
La Paz, like other districts of Iloilo City, is served mostly by passenger jeepneys, white metered taxis, and tricycles within the district. It is also the location of the headquarters of Panay Railways, which operated a railroad from Iloilo City to Roxas City from 1907 to the 1980s.

== See also ==
- Batchoy
- Panay Railways
