= Misua =

Type of Chinese wheat noodles

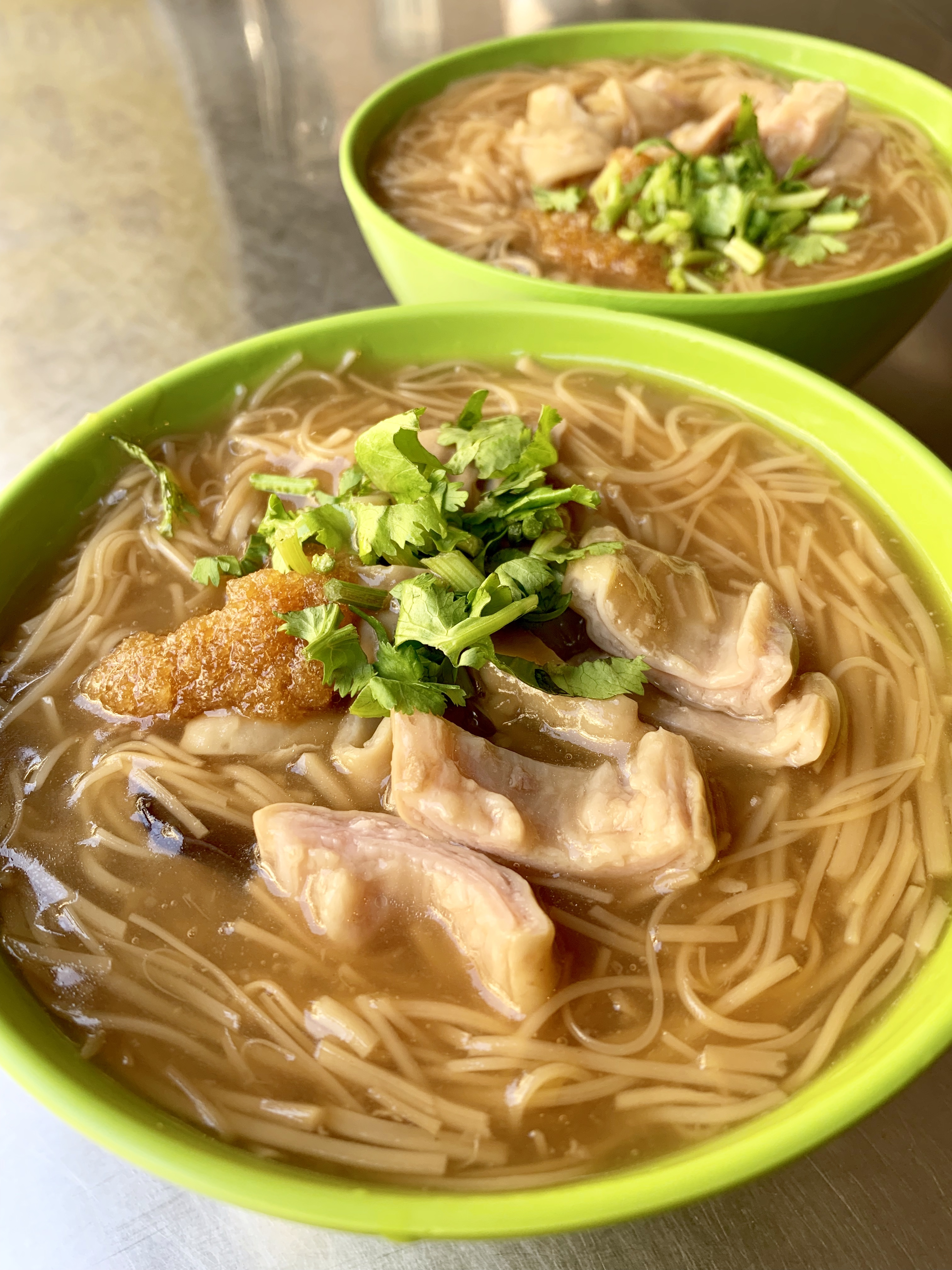
- Misua noodles from Taiwan
- Alternative names: Wheat vermicelli
- Type: Chinese noodles
- Place of origin: China
- Region or state: Fujian
- Main ingredients: Wheat flour

Chinese name
- Traditional Chinese: 麵線
- Simplified Chinese: 面线
- Literal meaning: noodle threads
Transcriptions
Standard Mandarin
- Hanyu Pinyin: miànxiàn
Southern Min
- Hokkien POJ: mī-sòaⁿ

Khmer name
- Khmer: មីសួ (mii suə)

Misua (also spelled miswa) is an extremely thin type of noodle made from wheat flour. It is common in East and Southeast Asia, especially in China, Philippines, Taiwan, Malaysia, Indonesia, Singapore, Vietnam, Brunei, and Thailand.

Misua noodles are very delicate and cook in less than two minutes. They are often used in soups or lightly boiled dishes. The noodles are known for breaking easily if overcooked.

== History ==
Misua originated in Fujian, China, where thin wheat noodles have been a staple for centuries. The noodle is traditionally associated with longevity and is often served during birthdays, festivals, and other celebrations to symbolize a long life. Chinese immigrants brought misua to Southeast Asia, where it was adapted into local cuisines. In the Philippines, misua became integrated into both home cooking and ceremonial meals, often eaten with chicken, pork, or seafood in festive soups. The adaptation demonstrates how Chinese culinary traditions influenced Filipino food culture over the centuries.

== Types ==
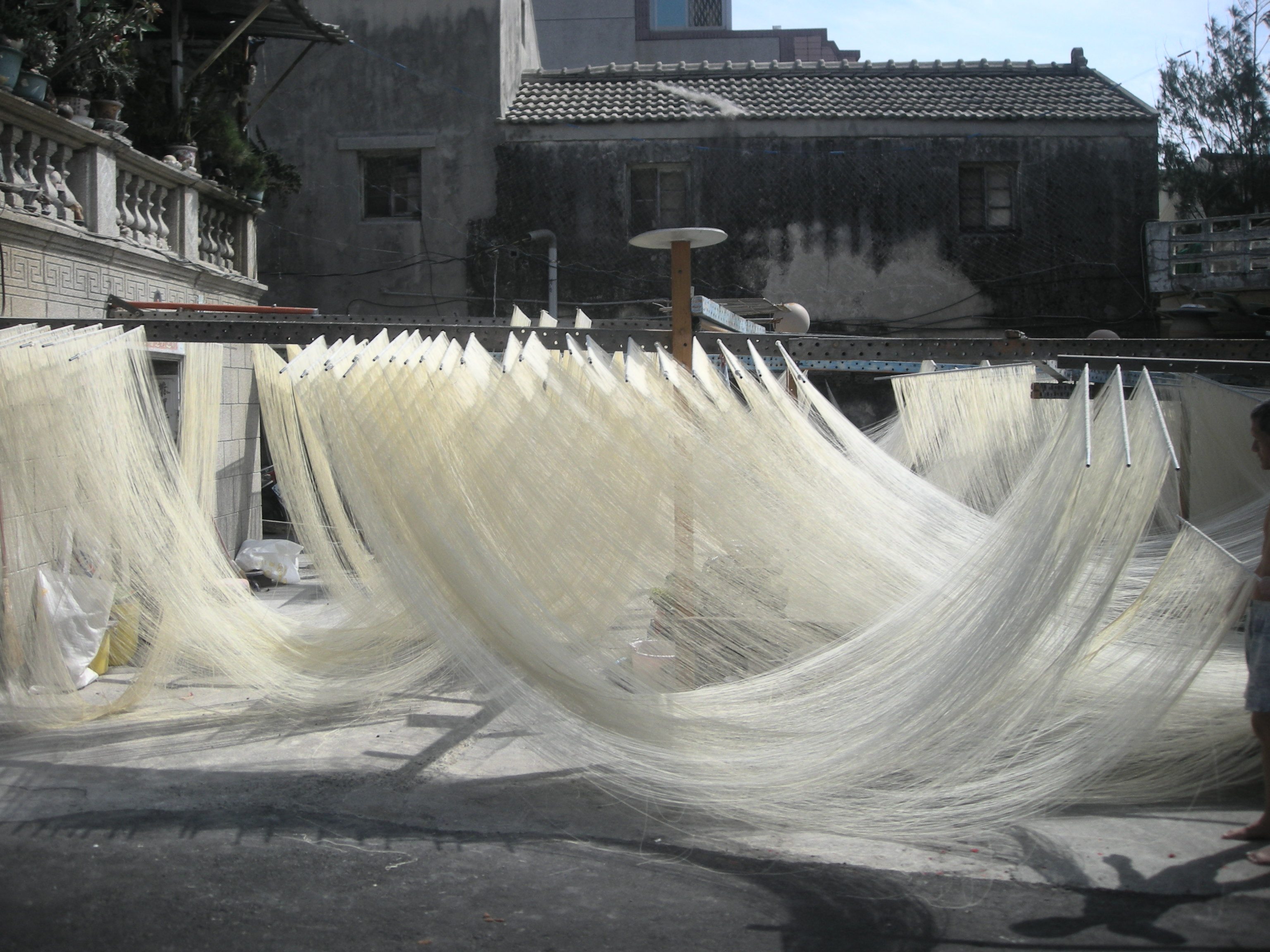
Misua being made in Penghu, Taiwan

In Taiwan, there are two forms of misua. The first is plain, while the second has been steamed at high heat, caramelizing it to a light brown colour. For birthdays, plain misua is usually served plain with pork hocks (猪腳麵線) in stewed broth as a Taiwanese birthday tradition. Brown misua can be cooked for prolonged periods without disintegrating in the cooking broth and is used in oyster vermicelli (蚵仔麵線), a dish popular in Taiwan.

== Culture ==
Misua is cooked during important festivities, and eaten in China as well in Cambodia, Malaysia, Indonesia, Singapore, Vietnam, Brunei, Thailand, Myanmar, and particularly in both Taiwan and the Philippines.

Misua signifies long life in Chinese culture, and as such is a traditional birthday food. Because of this, it is often discouraged to chew or cut misua noodles. It is usually served with ingredients such as eggs, tofu, bell peppers, oysters, pig's large intestine, sponge gourd (known as patola in the Philippines), shiitake mushroom, beef, shallots, or scallions, roasted nuts or fried fish.

== Gallery ==
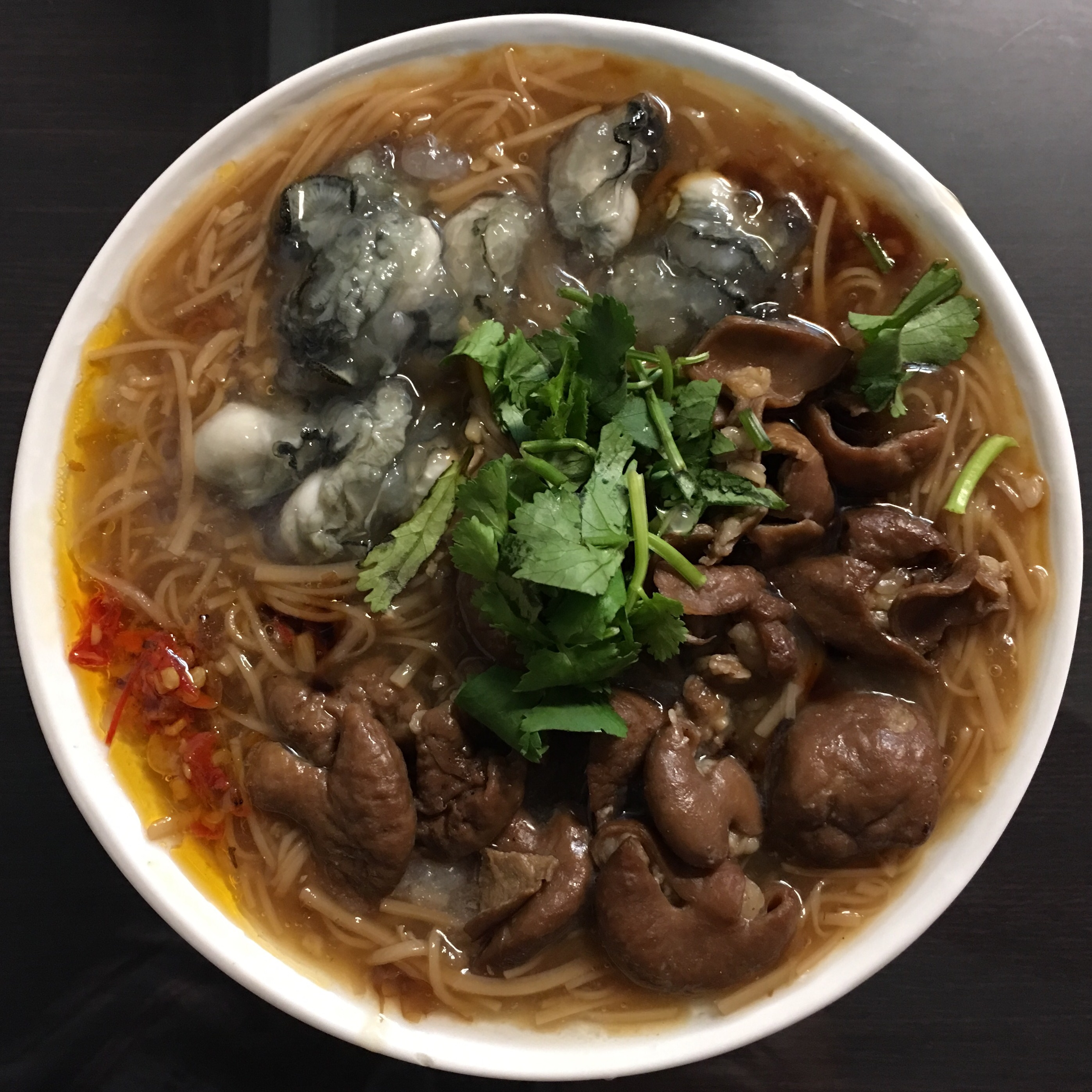
Taiwanese oyster misua

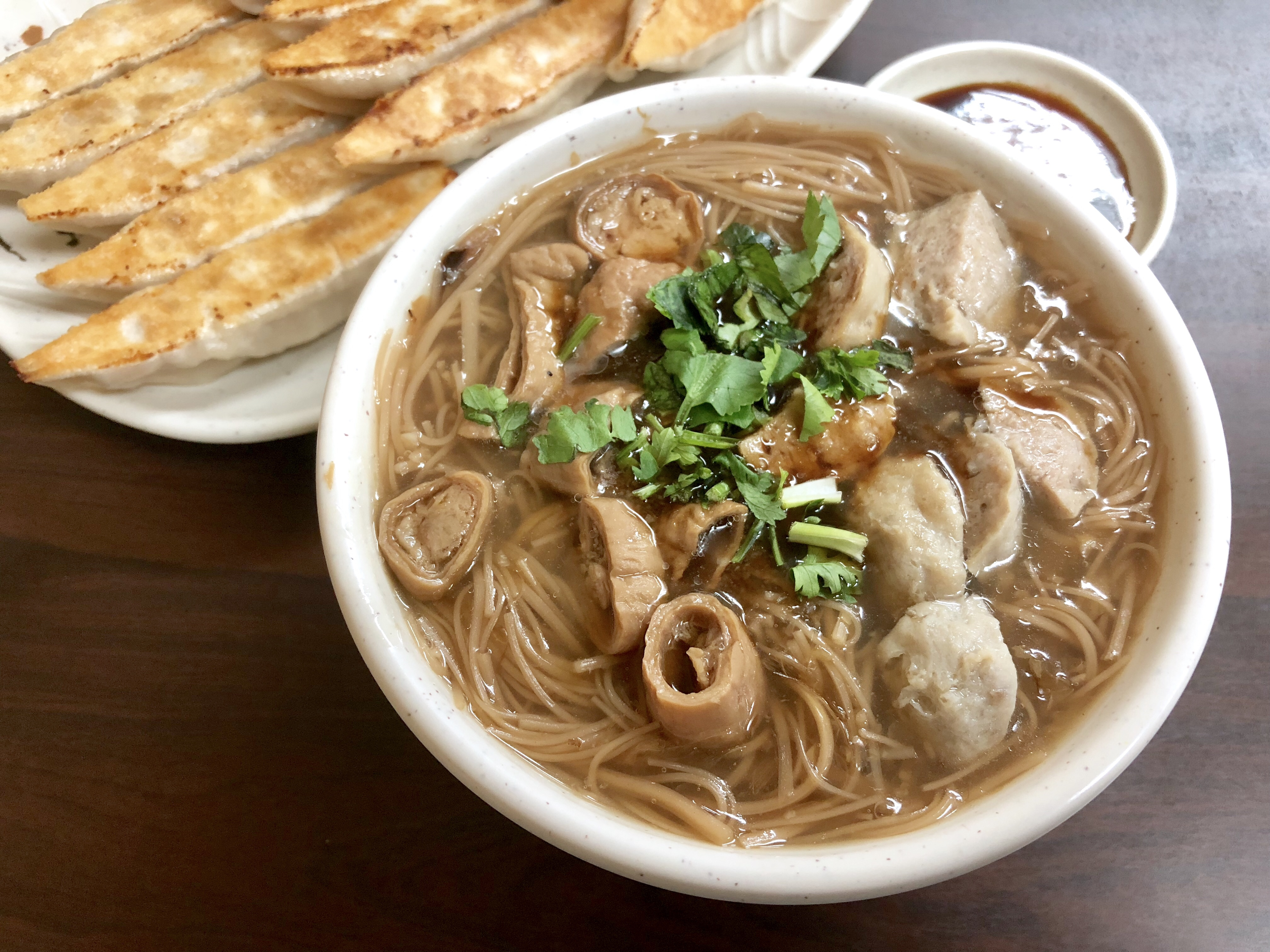
With pork intestines

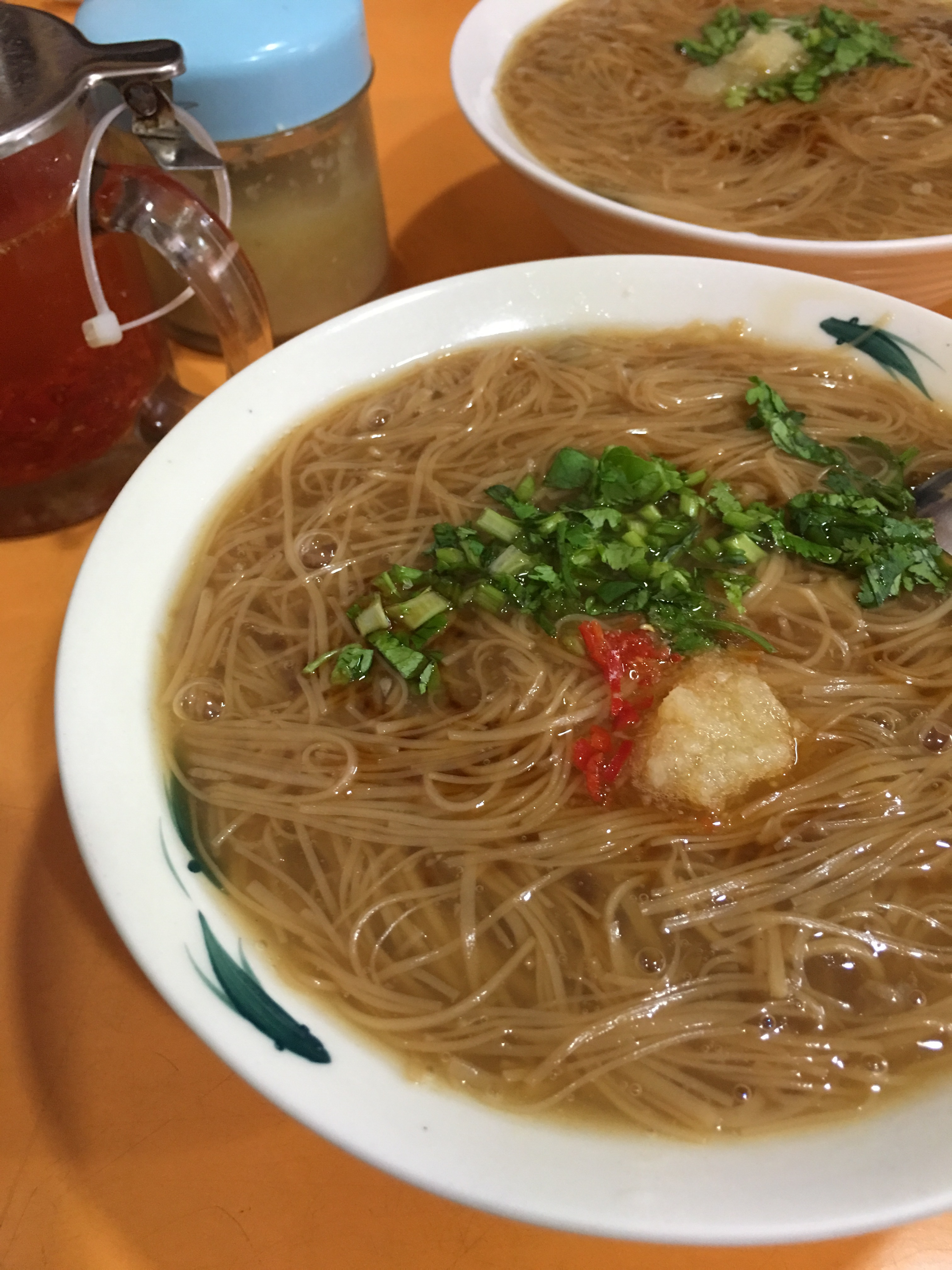

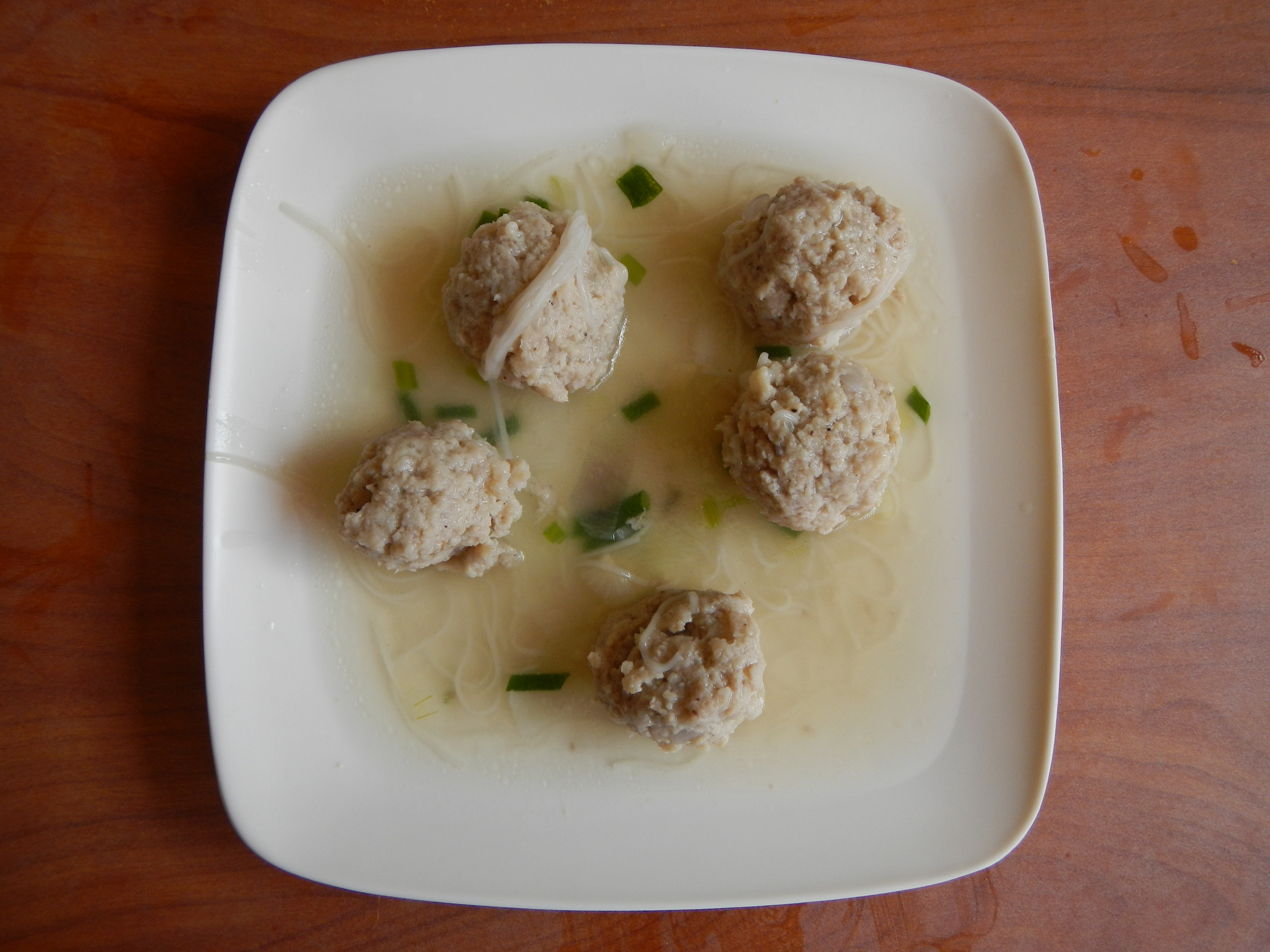
With Filipino bola-bola

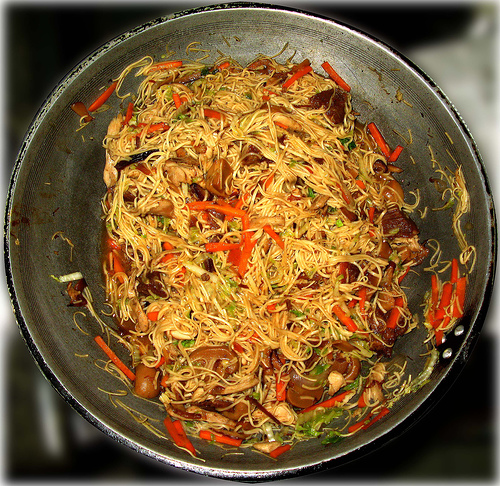
Fried misua with vegetables

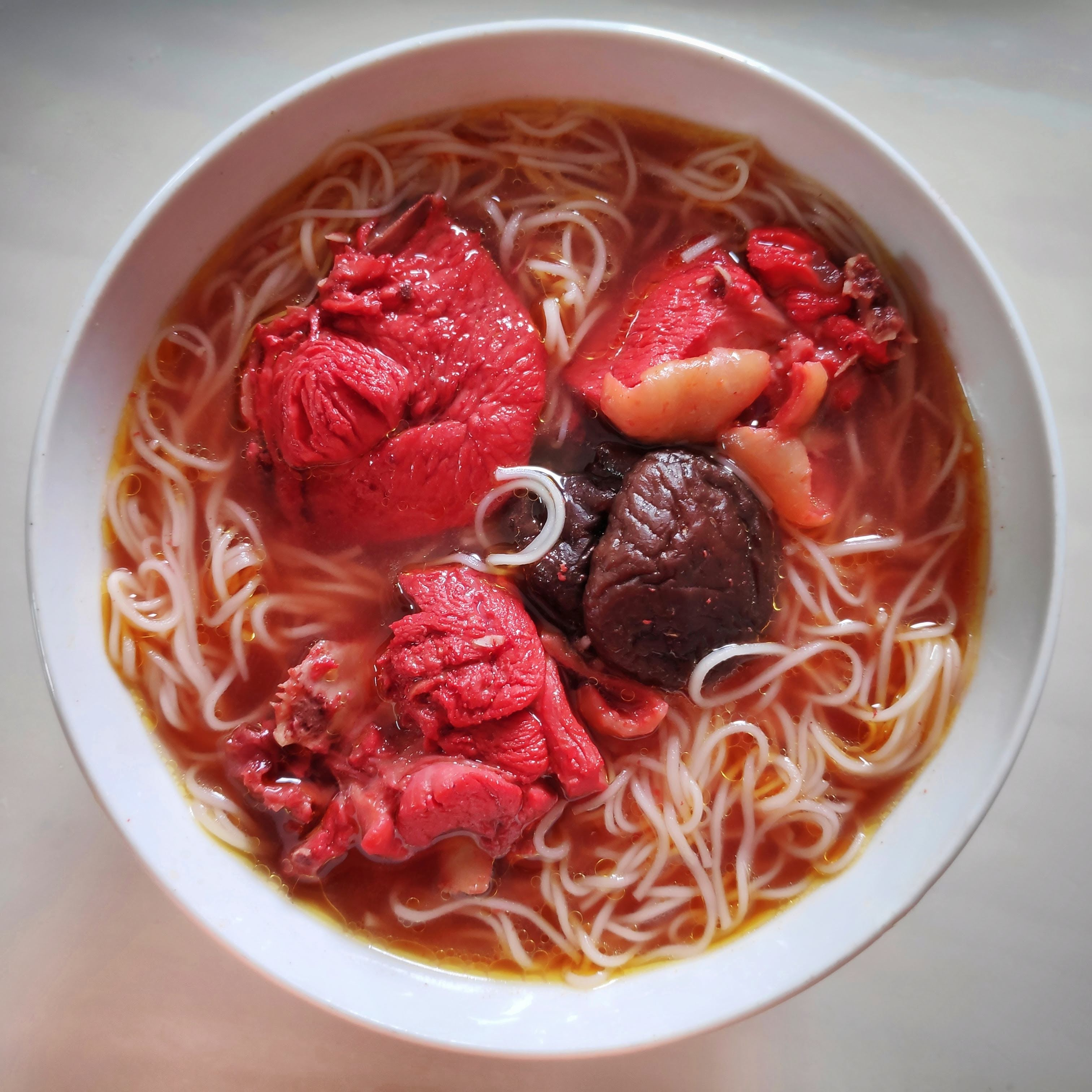
With red rice wine and chicken

== See also ==
- Chinese noodles
- List of noodles
- Longevity noodles
- Pancit
- Sōmen
- Vermicelli
