= Ohn no khao swè =

Burmese wheat noodles

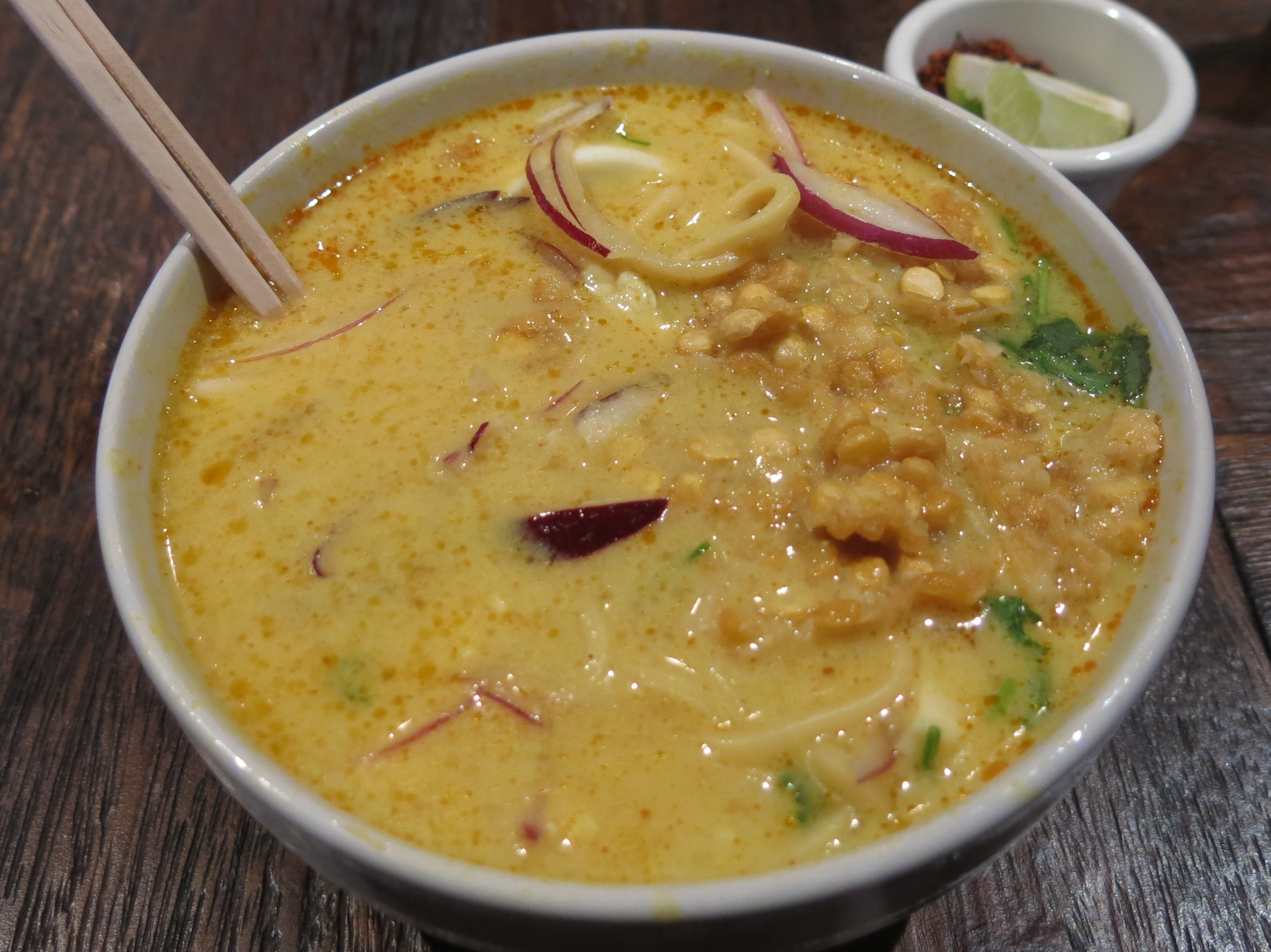
- Ohn no khao swè served with chickpea fritters, onions, and coriander.
- Alternative names: ohn no khauk swe; on no khauk swe; ohn no khau swe; oh noh kauswe
- Type: Noodle soup
- Course: Breakfast; Brunch
- Place of origin: Myanmar (Burma)
- Associated cuisine: Burmese cuisine
- Main ingredients: Wheat egg noodles, curried chicken in coconut milk broth, hard-boiled egg, crisp noodles, sliced onions, chili
- Variations: Khow suey
- Similar dishes: Laksa, khao soi

Ohn no khao swè (Burmese: အုန်းနို့ခေါက်ဆွဲ, MLCTS: un: nui. hkauk hcwai:; IPA: [ʔóʊɰ̃ no̰ kʰaʊʔ sʰwɛ́]) is a Burmese dish consisting of wheat noodles in a curried chicken and coconut milk broth thickened with gram flour (chickpea flour). Burmese fritters, especially crispy fried bean fritters, alongside hard-boiled eggs, sliced raw onions, chili peppers, and crispy noodles are added to the dish. Fish sauce and lime or lemon juice are then drizzled over the bowl.

Some versions of the dish, especially in street food settings and some homes, use evaporated milk instead of coconut milk to address health concerns about high blood pressure. Another variation, called shwe taung khao swe, mixes dry noodles with chicken curry cooked in coconut milk.

== Origins ==
The exact beginnings of ohn no khao swè are hard to pin down because there are not many records available. It is thought to have originated in Shwedaung, a town near Pyay, but this is only a highly-believed theory. However, it is still well-known as a traditional Burmese dish that has gained popularity and various adaptations in countries beyond Myanmar. It's known for its use of coconut milk and egg noodles, a combination appreciated not only in Myanmar but also in other parts of the world. This dish has a rich history of cultural exchange and adaptation, reflecting the diverse culinary influences it has encountered.

While its origins can be traced back to Myanmar, where it's considered a staple among the Burmese people, variations of coconut milk-based noodle soups with egg noodles can be found in many cuisines globally. These dishes showcase the versatility and appeal of this comforting combination, enjoyed by people of different cultures worldwide.

Spread to Pakistan
The dish's travel to Pakistan is intimately associated with the movements of the Memon community, an Indian group originally from Gujarat. A large number of Memons migrated to Pakistan during and after India's 1947 partition, and a sizable portion also settled in Myanmar. Over the years, Memons who had lived in Myanmar brought back Ohn Noh Khauk Swe to Pakistan, where it underwent further adaptations to suit local tastes, including the incorporation of South Asian spices and the substitution of traditional ingredients with locally available alternatives such as spaghetti for egg noodles. The dish's popularity within the Memon community in Pakistan, particularly in Karachi, is attributed to its communal nature, often being shared at gatherings, prayer feasts, and family dinners. This communal aspect resonates with the Memon community's values and has been a key factor in its widespread acceptance and adaptation.

Cultural Significance
Ohn Noh Khauk Swe's adaptation in Pakistan is evidence of how easily cultures may interact and how food customs can cut across national and cultural divides. The meal, known locally as Khausa in Memon, is a combination of South Asian and Burmese cooking techniques that symbolizes the shared experiences and historical ties between the two groups.

== Regional varieties ==
Ohn no khauk swe, known for its rich flavors and comforting essence, has inspired a variety of similar noodle dishes across Southeast Asia, each with its own unique ingredients and preparation methods. These regional varieties reflect the diverse culinary landscapes of the area, blending local tastes with the foundational elements of ohn no khauk swe.

=== Khao soi ===
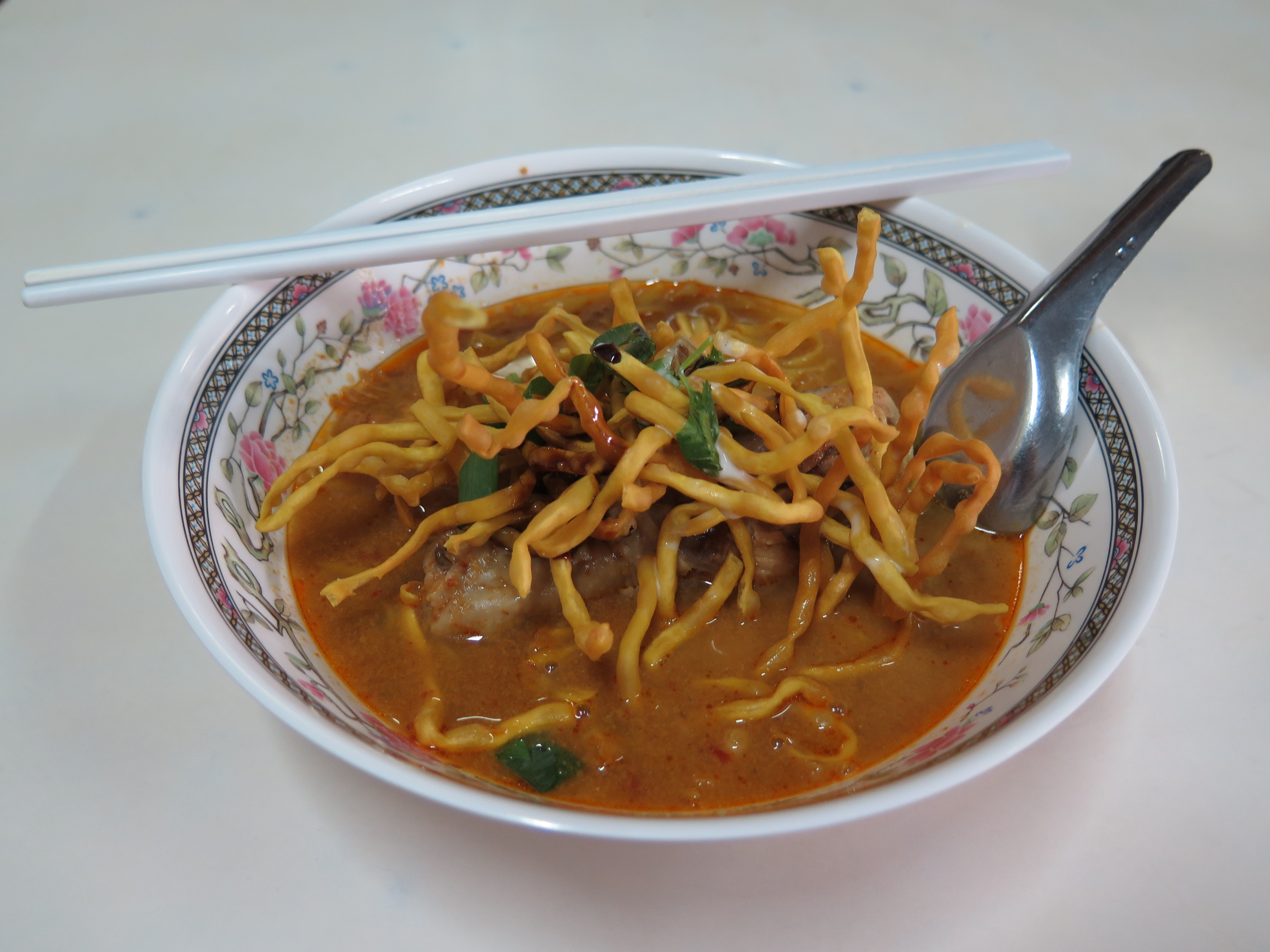
A bowl of khao soi, a spicy noodle soup commonly found in Chiang Mai, Thailand

Khao soi is a Northern Thai dish with possible roots in Myanmar's ohn no khauk swe. It consists of egg noodles in a curry-like soup made from coconut milk, seasoned with curry powder and turmeric, which gives it a distinctive yellow color. Khao soi is traditionally served with chicken or beef, garnished with pickled mustard greens, shallots, lime, and ground chilies fried in oil. This dish is particularly popular in Chiang Mai and represents a fusion of Thai and Burmese flavors.

=== Khao poon ===
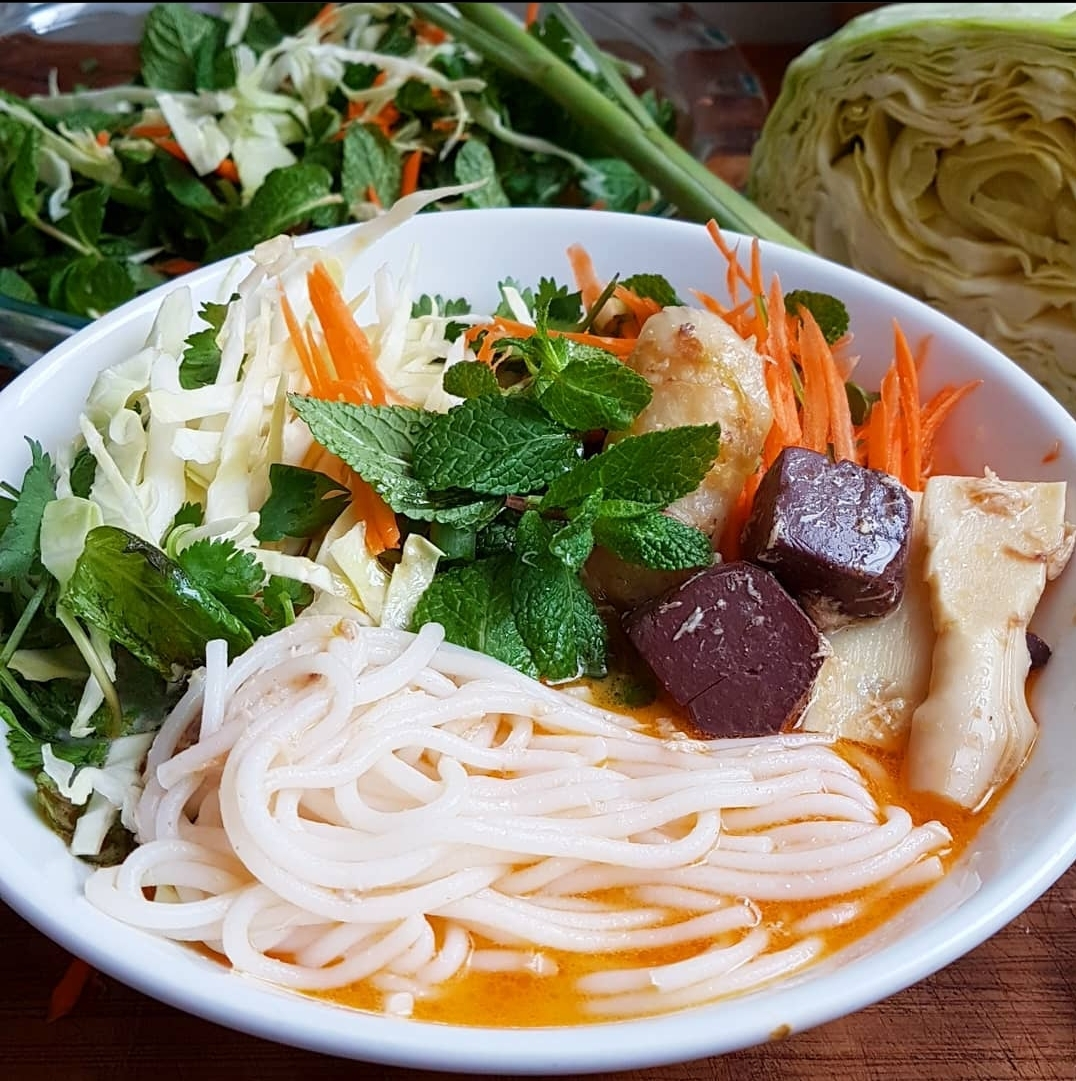
Lao khao poon

Khao poon is a widely favored noodle soup in Laos, characterized by its use of Lao rice vermicelli and a variety of proteins like pounded chicken, fish, or pork, typically in a coconut milk broth, seasoned with traditional Lao ingredients such as fish sauce, padaek, lime leaves, galangal, garlic, shallots, Lao chilies, and fish mint. Referred to as Lao royal vermicelli coconut curry soup, khao poon is distinguished by its vibrant red and golden hues reminiscent of the Lao royal family. The dish bears resemblance to ohn no khauk swe, a Burmese coconut noodle soup, with the Burmese variation distinguished by its intensified coconut essence and milder spice level.

=== Laksa ===
Laksa, a creamy rice noodle soup featuring chicken and often shrimp, is enjoyed in Malaysia and various South Asian countries like Singapore, Thailand, and Indonesia. When not specified, laksa typically refers to curry laksa, characterized by its flavorful base called laksa paste, akin to red curry paste.

== Gallery ==
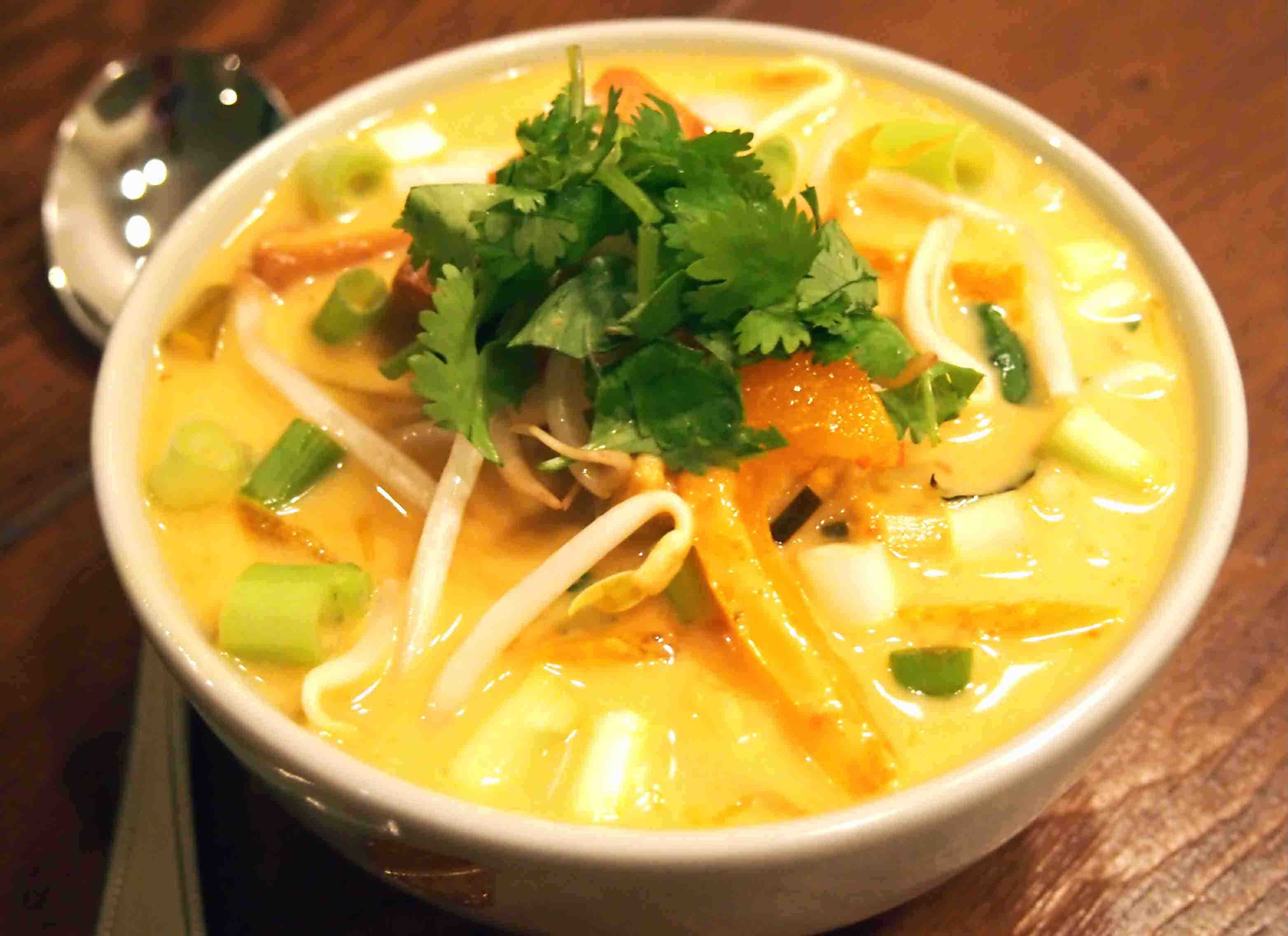
Restaurant serving ohn no khao swe

== See also ==
- Khow suey
- Khao soi
- Laksa
- Noodle soup
