= Khao soi =

Thai noodle soup

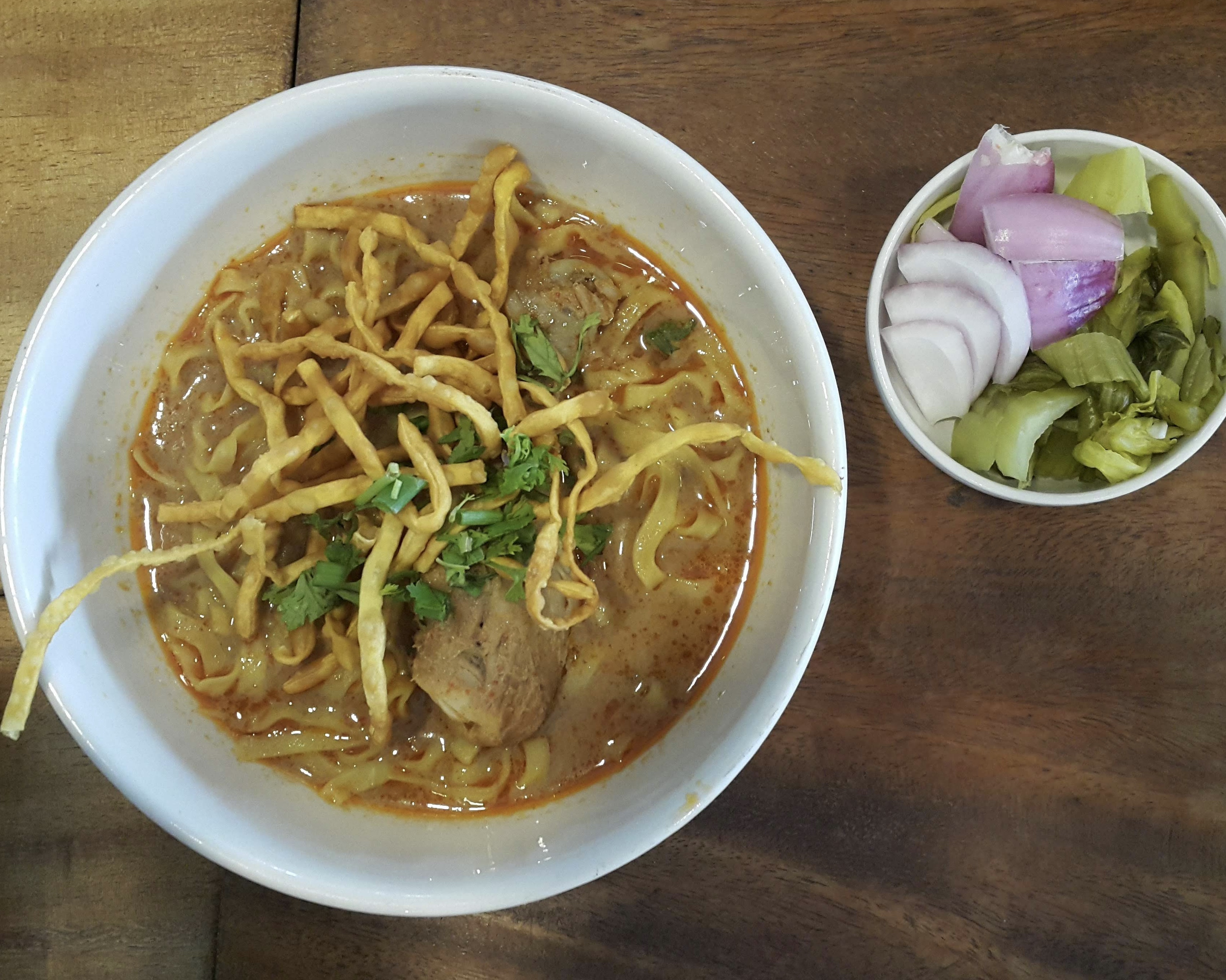
- Chicken khao soi with fermented vegetables in Chiang Mai Province, Thailand
- Alternative names: Khao soy
- Type: Noodle soup
- Region or state: Northern Thailand, China (Xishuangbanna), Northern Laos, and Myanmar
- Associated cuisine: Thailand, China, Myanmar and Laos
- Created by: Chin Haw Muslims
- Main ingredients: Hand-cut rice or egg noodles, coconut milk, curry soup base
- Variations: Northern Thai khao soi, Lao khao soi
- Similar dishes: Ohn no khao swè

Khao soi or khao soy (Thai: ข้าวซอย, pronounced [kʰâ(ː)w sɔ̄ːj]; Lanna: ᩮᨡᩢ᩶ᩣᨪᩬ᩠ᨿ, pronounced [kʰa᷇(ː)w sɔ̄ːj]; Lao: ເຂົ້າຊອຍ, pronounced [kʰȁ(ː)w sɔ́ːj]; Shan: ၶဝ်ႈသွႆး, pronounced [kʰaw˧˧˨.sʰɔj˥]; Burmese: အုန်းနို့ခေါက်ဆွဲ, pronounced [ʔóʊɴ no̰ kʰaʊʔ sʰwɛ́]) is a noodle dish from Northern Thailand made of wheat egg noodles in coconut milk curry, usually served with chicken or beef. Historically, it was also known as kway teow Ho. It is widely regarded as the most famous dish of Chiang Mai and of northern Thailand. Its name is associated with the traditional method of cutting (soi) noodle dough into strips. The dish is generally traced to Yunnanese Muslim traders, known in Thailand as Chin Ho, who travelled caravan routes into the Lanna region and settled in Chiang Mai in the late 19th and early 20th centuries, while Burmese and Indian cooking also influenced its development.

Khao soi is topped with deep-fried crispy noodles, and its curry paste combines dried chilies, shallots, garlic and spices such as black cardamom, coriander seeds and turmeric. Versions with pork and seafood have developed over time, and styles differ by region. Related dishes include the Burmese ohn no khao swè, a Shan rice noodle dish called kao soi, and a very different Lao khao soi. The dish is usually served with pickled mustard greens, shallots, lime and roasted chili paste.

Khao soi is regarded as part of the multicultural culinary heritage of Lanna. Most of its energy comes from fat and carbohydrates, and researchers have developed higher-protein versions as well as ready-to-use curry paste and sauce products. Although it is less known internationally than tom yum or pad thai, it has been promoted as part of Thai gastronomy tourism and soft power.

== Etymology ==
Khao soi was once called kway teow Ho, a name that referred to its egg noodles served in curry broth. The name khao soi is linked to the way the noodles were made before machines were available. Cooks mixed wheat flour, eggs, salt and water into a dough, rolled it into flat sheets and then cut (soi) the sheets into thin strips with a knife. A similar explanation is given for the Shan dish kao soi: according to Jotika Khur-yearn of the Shan Cultural Association in London, kao means "rice" and soi means "to cut" in Shan, because the noodles were traditionally made by grinding, boiling and drying rice and then slicing it.

Writer Austin Bush has suggested another possibility. Several of the caravan routes passed through Myanmar, where the general word for noodles is the Shan term hkauk-hswe. Bush suggests that this word was changed to khao soi in northern Thai and could have been used for almost any noodle dish, although he admits that this is speculation.

== History ==
Khao soi developed within the multicultural food culture of Lanna, drawing on Chinese, Shan, Burmese and Indian influences that reached the region through trade and travel. As Chiang Mai grew into a centre of trade, it attracted Shan, Burmese, Chinese and other traders, and dishes with foreign roots such as khao soi became established there before spreading across northern Thailand. The strongest influence is usually credited to Yunnanese Chinese Muslims, known in northern Thailand as Ho or Chin Ho. Some popular accounts say that the dish evolved from Chin Haw Muslim traders who plied the spice route when the region was under Burmese control. The origin of the term Ho is uncertain, and it separates these overland migrants from the Chinese who came to Thailand by sea.

=== Caravan trade and settlement ===
Overland trade between Yunnan and Northern Thailand may date back to the 16th century. By the 19th century, caravans of Yunnanese traders, nearly all of them Hui Muslims from the Dali region of western Yunnan, travelled to northern Thailand every year during the cool, dry season, roughly from November to April. Their main route ran from Simao in southern Yunnan through Kengtung in the Shan States, and some caravans continued through Chiang Mai to Mawlamyine (Moulmein) in Burma. According to Liulan Wang, the traders carried goods such as cotton textiles, silk, felt and medicines from Yunnan, and returned with ivory and traditional medicinal materials. According to Eckhardt, these caravans travelled through the Shan State in Myanmar, Laos and Thailand from the 18th to the early 20th centuries. The caravan trade declined gradually in the early 20th century.

Some traders eventually settled in northern Thai cities, including Chiang Mai and Chiang Rai. In Chiang Mai, Yunnanese Muslim traders helped to found the Chang Phuak mosque in 1877, and in the early 20th century more Chin Ho settled east of the old walled city, in the area now known as Ban Ho. In 1915, the ruler of Chiang Mai allowed the Chin Ho to settle and work in the city, and some of them opened shops selling khao soi made with freshly prepared noodles. Khao soi begins to be mentioned around this period, as a dish said to have been sold and eaten only by Chin Ho, and it was originally halal.

Wang distinguishes these early Hui traders from a later and much larger wave of Yunnanese migration. After the Chinese Communists took power in 1949, soldiers of the defeated Nationalist Army (Kuomintang, KMT) and their supporters, most of whom were Han Chinese, fled from Yunnan through Burma into northern Thailand. Before the 1950s, the Hui made up most of the Yunnanese in Thailand, but this migration made the Han the majority. By 1998, more than 80,000 Han Yunnanese and about 10,000 Hui Yunnanese lived in northern Thailand. Many former KMT soldiers settled in the remote mountains of Chiang Mai, Chiang Rai and Mae Hong Son provinces, where they introduced tea growing and Yunnanese-Chinese dishes. Khao soi, however, is linked to the earlier Muslim community, which most likely introduced it to Chiang Mai.

Family histories collected by journalist Robyn Eckhardt show how the dish changed over time. The Suthasinee restaurant was opened by the son of a Chin Ho trader who had sold a clear soup with rice noodles, and the son and his wife later replaced the rice noodles with egg noodles and added curry paste and coconut milk. The owner of Khao Soi Lamduan Faham said that the shop's founder learned the dish from a Chin Ho cook who used hand-cut rice noodles coloured with turmeric, and that the founder changed to egg noodles and added curry paste to suit the northern Thai taste for spicy food.

There are several explanations for the coconut milk and spices. Coconut milk is rare in northern Thai cooking, which has led some writers to suggest that khao soi is a local version of the Burmese ohn no khao swè. Chef Andy Ricker notes that, depending on the source, the dish's roots are credited to either Burmese or Chinese Muslim cooking, and he suggests that coconut milk may also have come from Burma. Other vendors believe that coconut milk and dried spices were added to suit central Thai diners or Chiang Mai's Indian and Burmese communities. A Chiang Mai University graduate student who researched khao soi suggested that Khao Soi Lamduan Faham added coconut milk to please its early customers, who were government officials from Bangkok, and that other shops then followed.

Other influences have also been described. Yaisumlee and colleagues note that Burmese people who worked in Lanna, many as foremen for British teak companies, brought dishes such as kaeng hang le and khanom chin nam ngiao, and also influenced khao soi. Trade with Indian merchants introduced spices such as turmeric, curry powder and cumin, which give the curry its golden colour and depth of flavour.

== Ingredients and preparation ==
The main components of khao soi are the noodles, a curry made from curry paste and coconut milk, meat, and seasonings such as fish sauce, soy sauce and sugar.

=== Noodles ===
Khao soi noodles are flat yellow wheat noodles made with chicken or duck eggs. Today they are usually rolled by machine, which gives them a soft but chewy texture. Each bowl contains the noodles in two forms: boiled noodles in the curry and a nest of deep-fried noodles on top, which adds a crunchy contrast. Some restaurants make their own noodles, including eggless versions.

Historical and regional variations of khao soi have also used different types of noodles. Some accounts suggest that earlier forms of the dish may have used rice noodles. These differences reflect the development of khao soi across different communities and culinary traditions. Another traditional method has also been described, in which the dough for wheat noodles is spread on a cloth stretched over boiling water, steamed, and then rolled and cut with scissors.

=== Curry paste ===
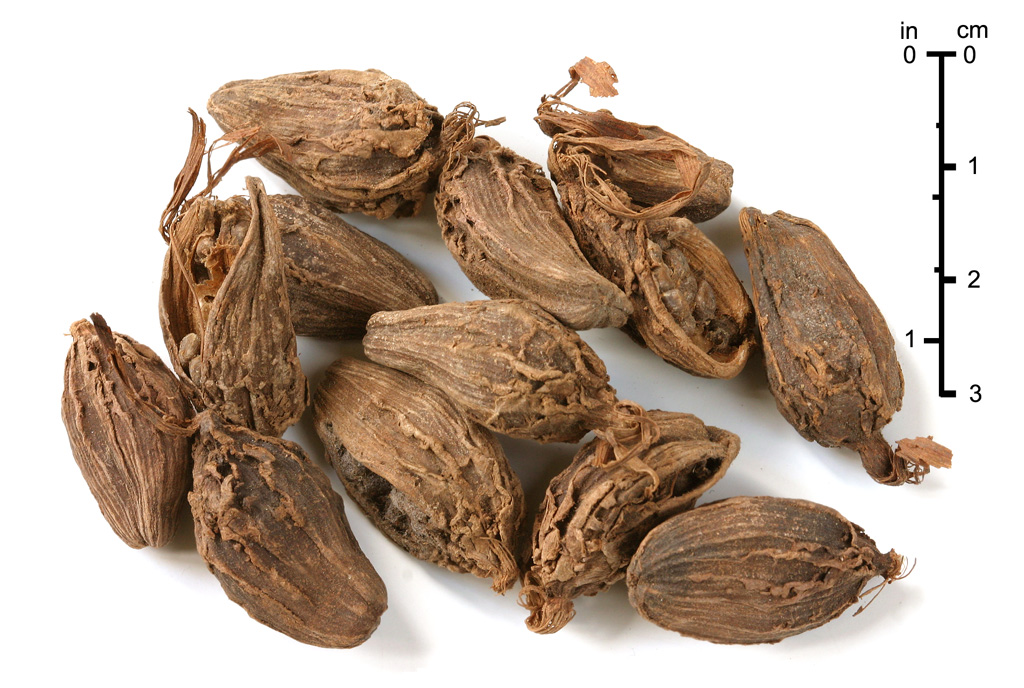
Black cardamom

The curry paste typically contains dried chilies, shallots, garlic, ginger, fresh turmeric and coriander root, together with dried spices such as black cardamom (known in Thai as cha kho), coriander seed and curry powder. Some recipes also add lemongrass, galangal, cumin and shrimp paste. The ingredients are roasted over low heat until fragrant and slightly charred and then pounded in a mortar, starting with the dry spices and finishing with the fresh aromatics. To make the curry, the paste is fried in oil or in coconut cream that has begun to separate, then combined with coconut milk and chicken and simmered gently for up to about an hour until the meat is tender. To serve, the noodles are placed in a bowl, the curry and chicken are ladled over them, and the dish is finished with coconut cream and fried noodles.

== Variations ==
Early khao soi was made only with beef or chicken, but pork, seafood and tofu versions have since appeared. Versions are often named after the meat used, such as khao soi kai (chicken), khao soi nuea (beef) and khao soi mu (pork).

=== Northern Thai khao soi ===
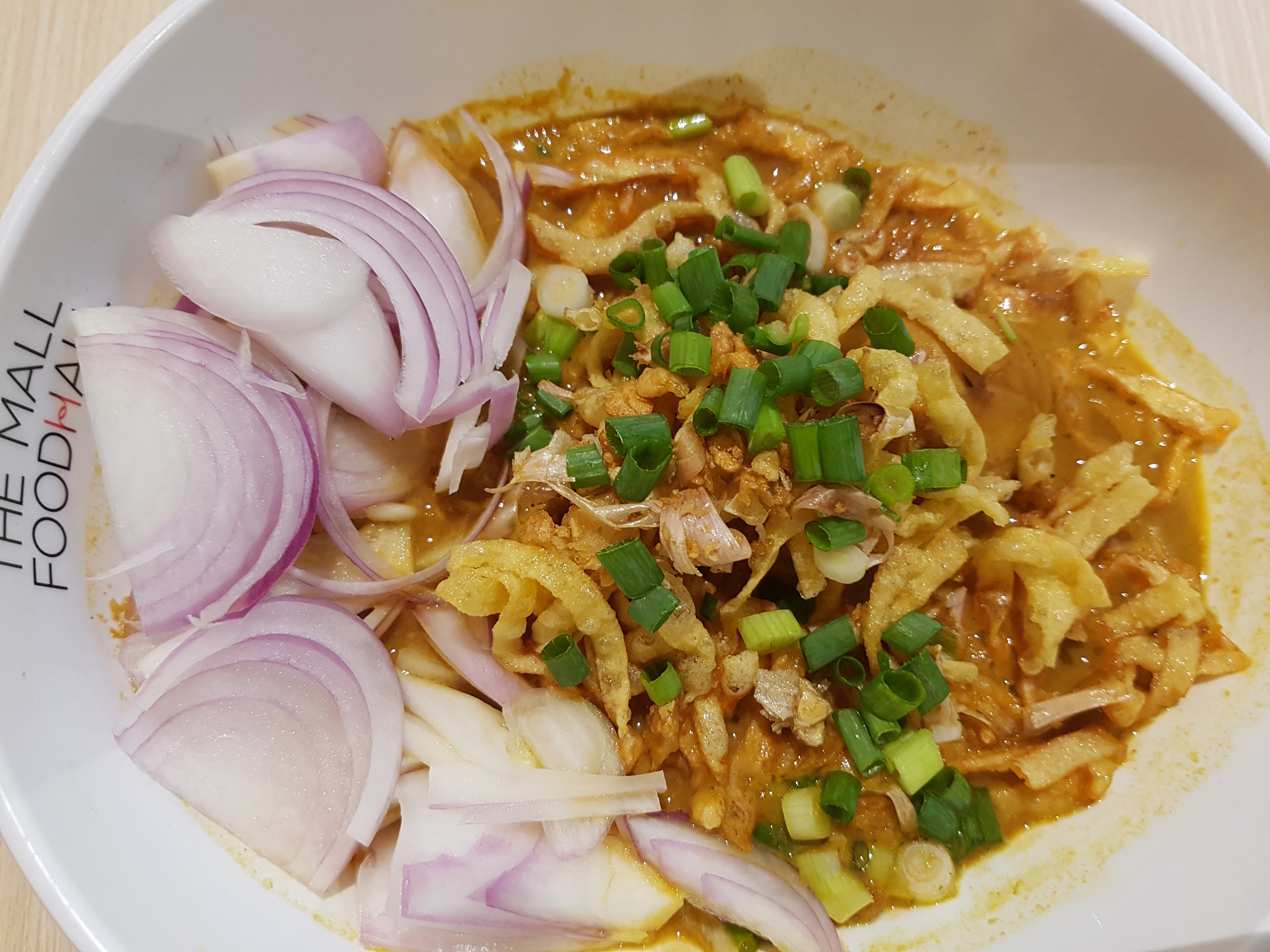
Thai khao soi in Bangkok

Northern Thai khao soi, sometimes called khao soi Islam, is a soup-like dish made with a mix of deep-fried crispy egg noodles and boiled egg noodles and meat in a curry-like sauce containing coconut milk, served with pickled mustard greens, shallots, lime and ground chillies fried in oil. It is closer to the present-day Burmese ohn no khao swè. The curry is somewhat similar to that of yellow or massaman curry but of a thinner consistency. It is popular as a street dish eaten by Thai people in northern Thailand, though not as frequently served as in Thai restaurants abroad.

Styles differ within Northern Thailand. The Chiang Mai style has a thick, strongly flavoured curry, while the style from Fang District has a lighter broth and uses different types of noodles. Ricker observes that almost every restaurant serves its own version, varying the curry paste, the amount of coconut milk and cream, the sweetness, the noodle style and the meat, with occasional unusual versions made with fish or cow's milk. The owners of Khao Soi Lamduan Faham on Fa Ham Road describe it as the oldest khao soi shop in Chiang Mai; it was 77 years old in 2009.

Another form associated with the Muslim-Chinese community is khao soi Yunnan, which differs substantially from the coconut-based Chiang Mai style. It is prepared without coconut milk and may include poached chicken, minced chicken cooked with pickled mustard greens and dried spices, fried peanuts, and wheat-and-egg noodles. The dish is traditionally served with pickled mustard greens, shallots, lime and a chili condiment. Other variants made without coconut milk and with rice noodles instead of egg noodles are mainly eaten in the eastern half of northern Thailand.

=== Burmese khao soi ===
Burmese ohn no khao swè

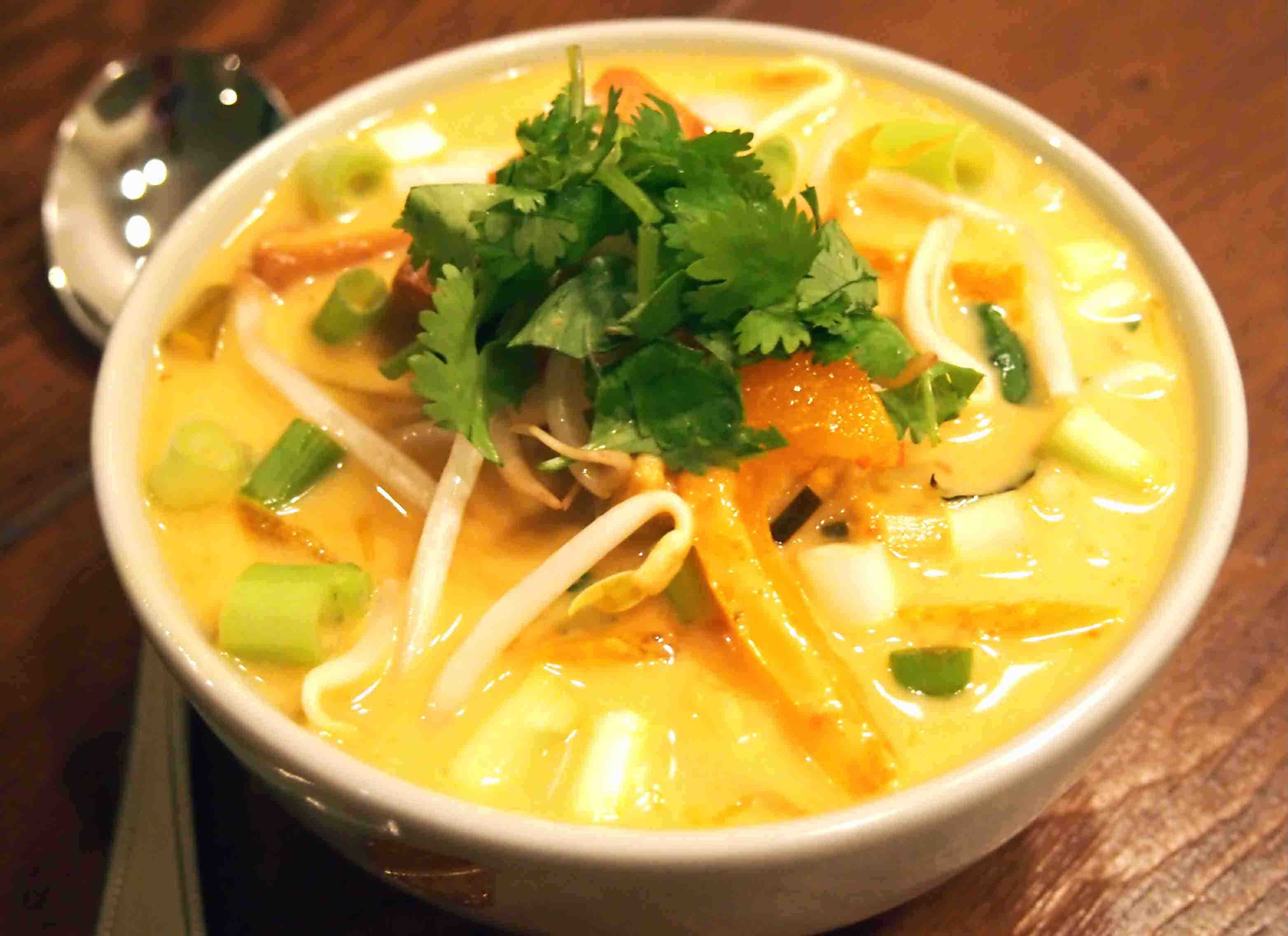
Burmese khow suey

Khao soi is closely related to ohn no khao swè, a Burmese noodle soup that is said to have influenced the Thai dish. Both dishes combine wheat noodles, a coconut milk broth and crispy fried noodles, served with lime and sliced shallots, but the Burmese version uses fewer spices than Lanna khao soi.

=== Shan khao soi ===
Shan khao soi (Shan: ၶဝ်ႈသွႆးတႆး; Burmese: ရှမ်းခေါက်ဆွဲ), also written kao soi, is part of the cuisine of the Shan people, who live mainly in Myanmar. It is made of hand-sliced rice noodles topped with a tomato and meat sauce without coconut milk. This version, as well as the version in Chiang Rai Province, can contain pieces of curdled blood (see khow suey).

=== Lao khao soi ===
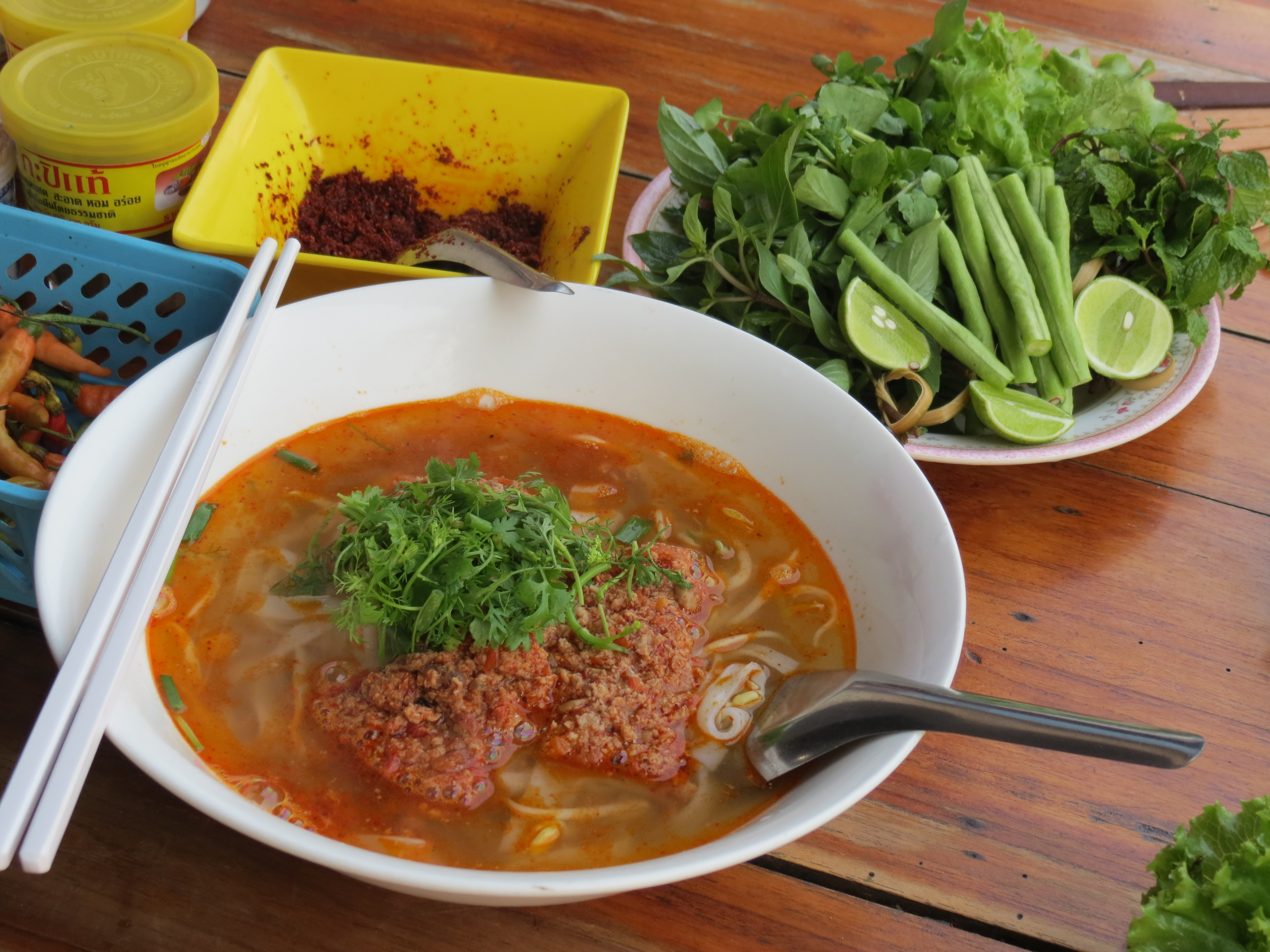
Lao khao soi in Luang Prabang

In Laos, a dish also called khao soi is made with pork, tomatoes and fermented soybeans. It is a very different soup from the Northern Thai curry noodle dish and has no relation to the Muslim-influenced version. Lao khao soi is a hand-sliced rice noodle soup with clear chicken, beef or pork broth, topped with a tomato meat sauce made of minced pork, tomatoes, garlic and fermented bean paste. The dish is always served with fresh herbs. The noodles are made from steamed rectangular sheets of rice flour batter, which are rolled and sliced into wide rice noodle ribbons. The northern Lao provinces of Luang Namtha and Luang Prabang are said to be the birthplace of Lao khao soi, and some vendors in this region still hand-slice their noodles. Northern Laotians have a special way of preparing this dish, and different versions of it can be found at Lao restaurants.

== Accompaniments and condiments ==
Khao soi is served with side dishes that diners use to season their own bowls. Pickled mustard greens and sliced shallots are the most common, often together with lime wedges and roasted chili paste (nam phrik phao) or fried dried chilies. Some cooks also serve cilantro, boiled eggs and a bottle of fish sauce at the table. The owner of Khao Soi Lamduan Faham, for example, says that the pickled greens should be sour enough to balance the sweetness of the coconut milk.

== Nutrition ==
Per 100 grams, khao soi provides about 138 kilocalories, 13.6 grams of fat, 2.6 grams of protein and 2.8 grams of dietary fibre. Most of its energy comes from carbohydrates in the noodles and fat in the coconut milk. Researchers at Chiang Mai University have tried to improve its nutritional value, for example by replacing part of the wheat flour in the noodles with soybean meal and by adding soy flour to both the noodles and the curry to raise the protein content. The soy flour version was developed as a meal for patients at Maharaj Nakorn Chiang Mai Hospital.

== Commercial products ==
Because traditional preparation is time-consuming and requires many ingredients, several ready-to-use products have been developed. In 2013, researchers developed a ready-to-cook khao soi curry paste, adjusting its sweetness and spiciness to suit consumers. In 2025, researchers at Suan Dusit University developed a ready-to-use khao soi sauce. Of three formulas thickened with different amounts of flour, the version with 2% flour received the highest consumer rating.

== In culture ==
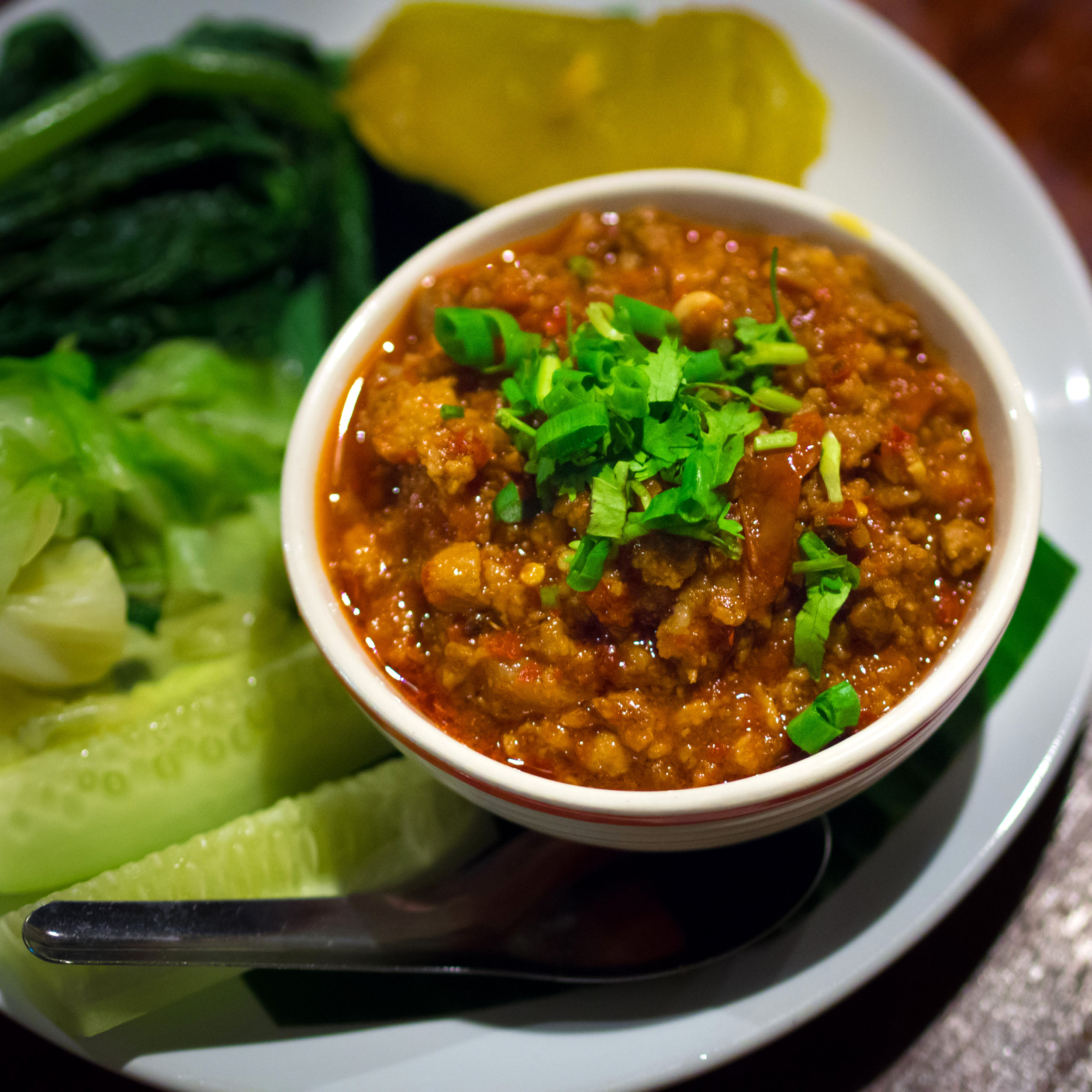
Nam phrik ong, another dish of northern Thailand

Dishes served on a khantok in Chiang Mai

Khao soi is considered one of the dishes that represent the cultural identity of northern Thailand, together with dishes such as kaeng hang le, nam phrik ong and sai ua. It is described as a product of Lanna multiculturalism, shaped by groups such as the Tai Yai, Chinese Muslims and Burmese, and reflecting exchange between Thailand, China, Myanmar and India. Ricker describes it as probably the best-known northern Thai dish and one that is especially popular with foreign visitors to Chiang Mai. It is so closely linked to the city that Thai restaurants abroad sometimes list it simply as "Chiang Mai noodles". In the past, khao soi was often eaten with family or at gatherings, served on a khantok, a low tray used for shared meals in Lanna.

=== Religious influences ===
Because of its association with Chinese Muslims, khao soi was originally halal, and it is still most commonly served with chicken or beef rather than pork. Some khao soi shops in Chiang Mai are run by Muslims. Ricker notes, for example, that Khao Soi Prince displays a star and crescent on its sign and sometimes closes for Islamic holidays.

=== Gastronomy tourism ===
Khao soi has gained international attention, and in 2022 the food website TasteAtlas placed it first on its list of the 50 best soups in the world, with a rating of 4.9 out of 5. After the ranking, Prime Minister Prayut Chan-o-cha said that the government would use the popularity of Thai food to strengthen the country's soft power, and asked the Ministry of Digital Economy and Society to promote local dishes with the help of social media influencers. This was part of a soft power policy launched earlier that year to promote Thai food, films, fashion, Muay Thai and festivals abroad.

== Gallery ==
Northern Thai khao soi

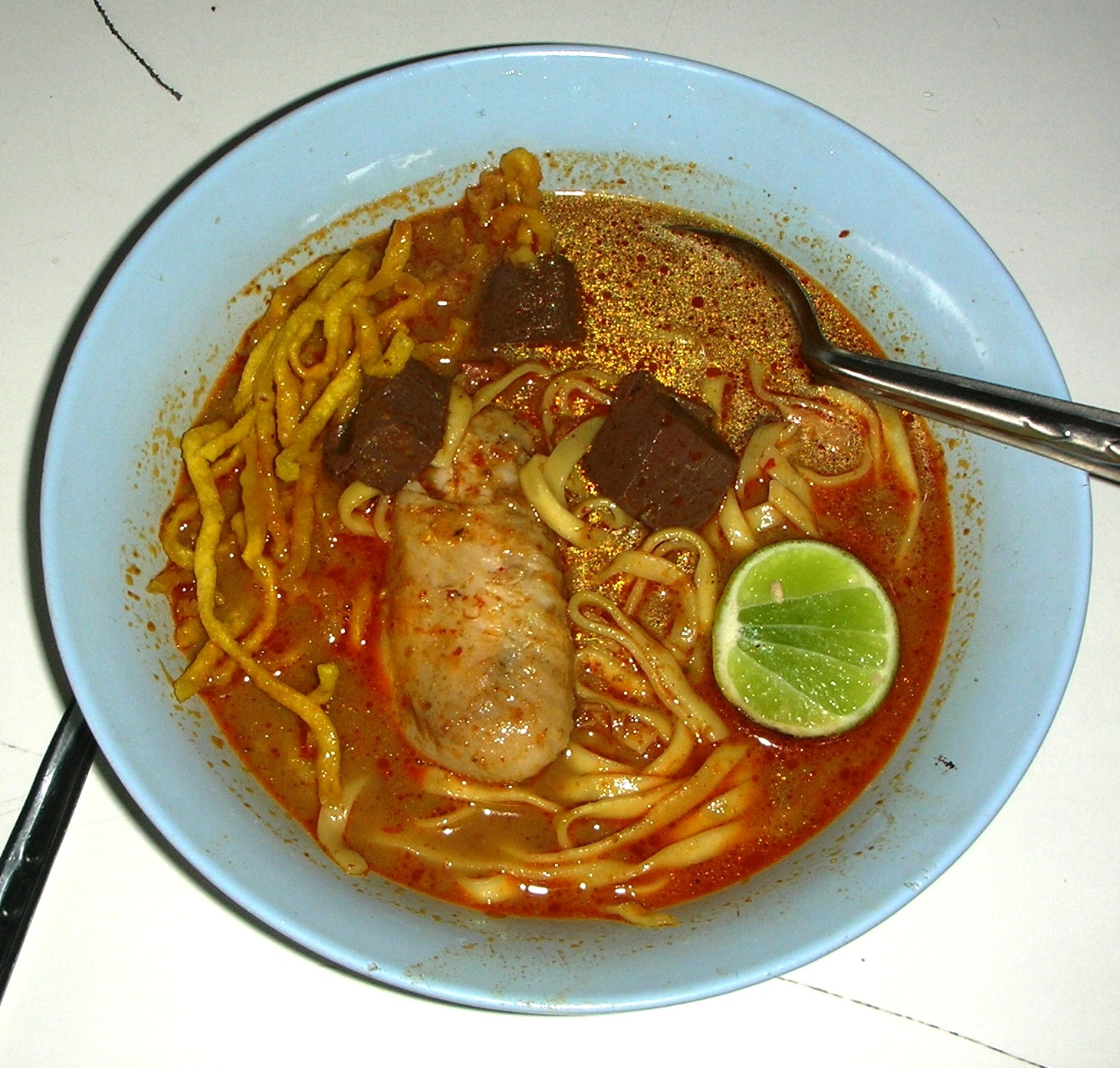
Chicken khao soi with curdled blood in a school cafeteria in Chiang Rai, Thailand.

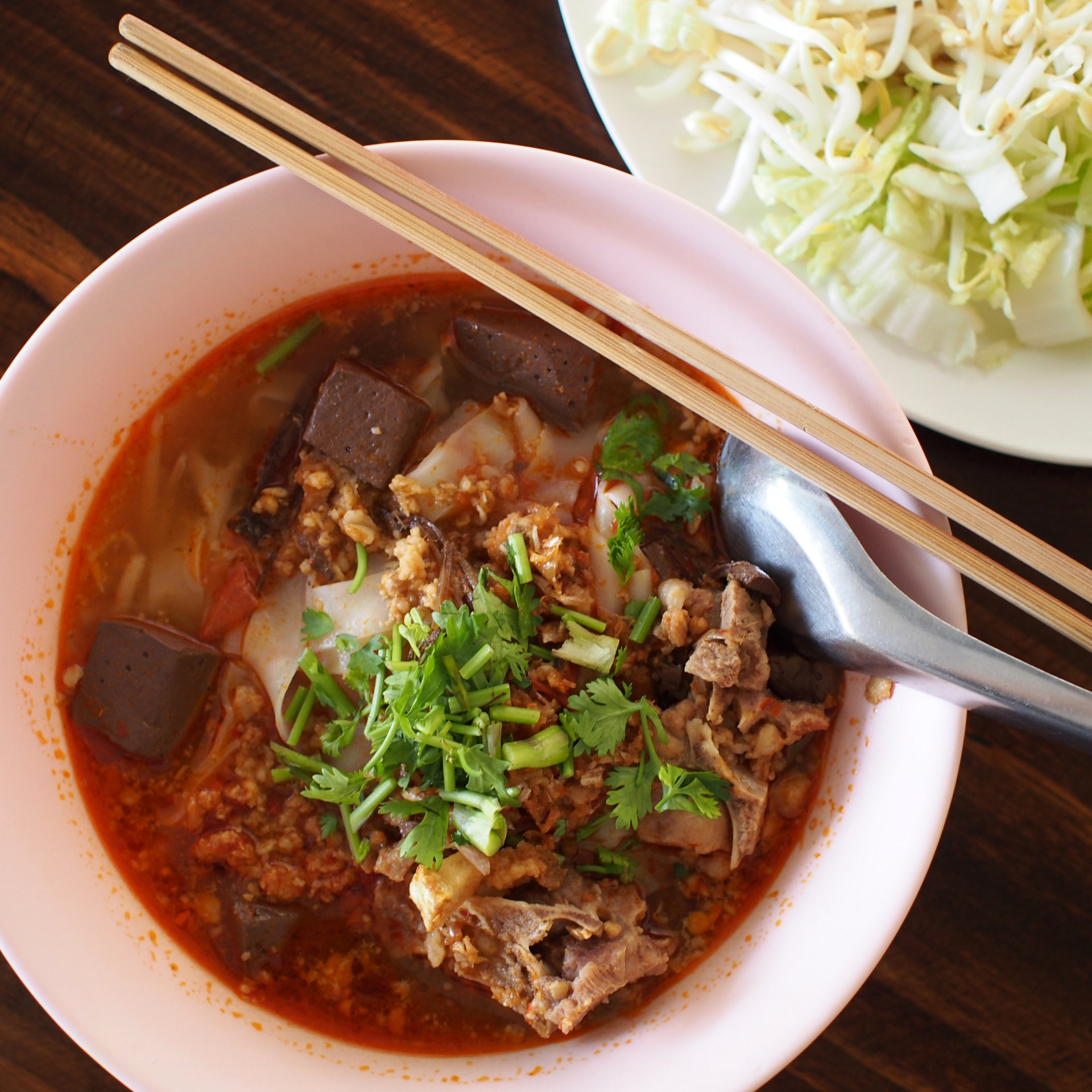
Khao soi Mae Sai, with (minced) pork and curdled blood, is a Thai variant that does not contain coconut milk or curry but uses the same sauce as in nam ngiao.

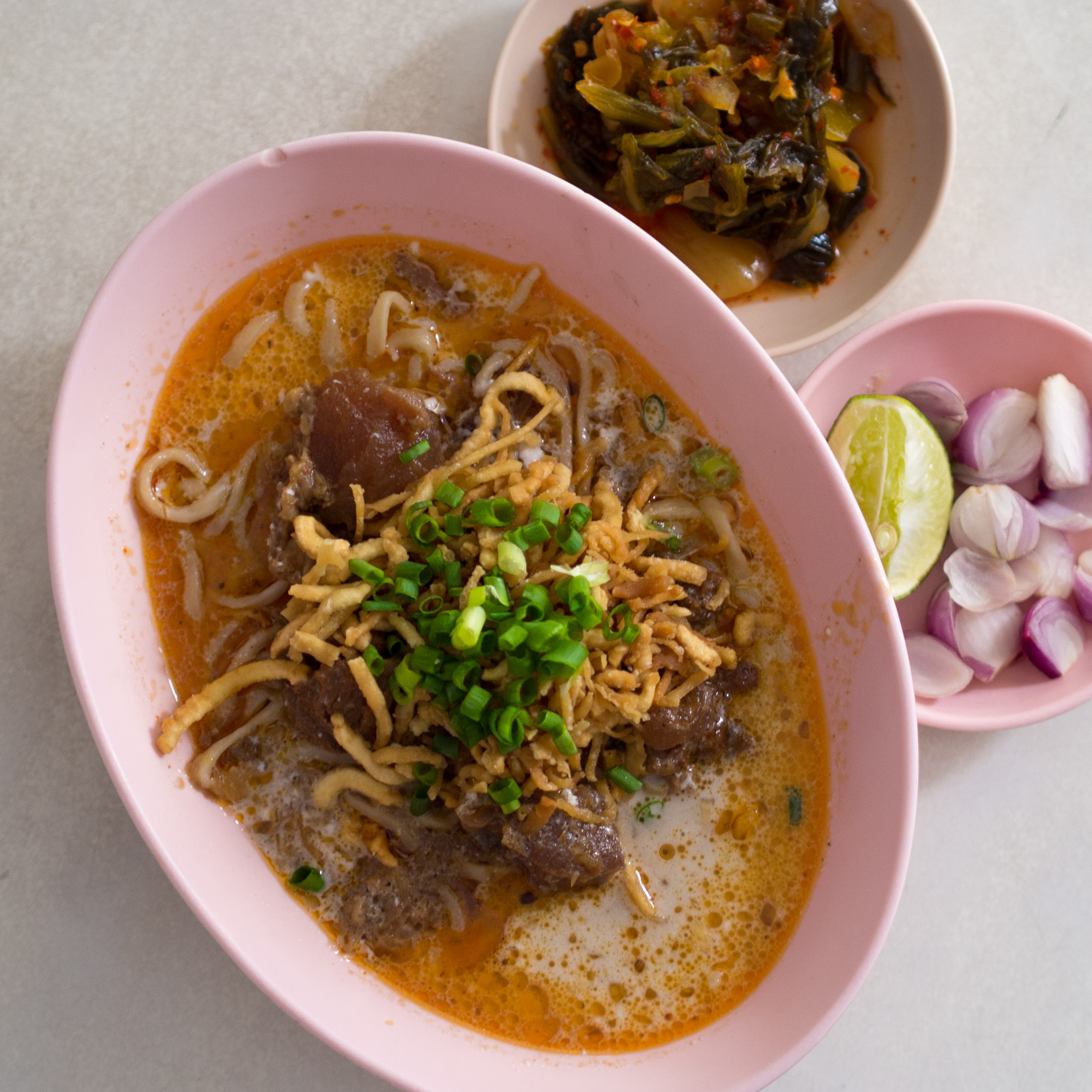
A Muslim style khao soi nuea (beef khao soi) in Chiang Mai, Thailand.

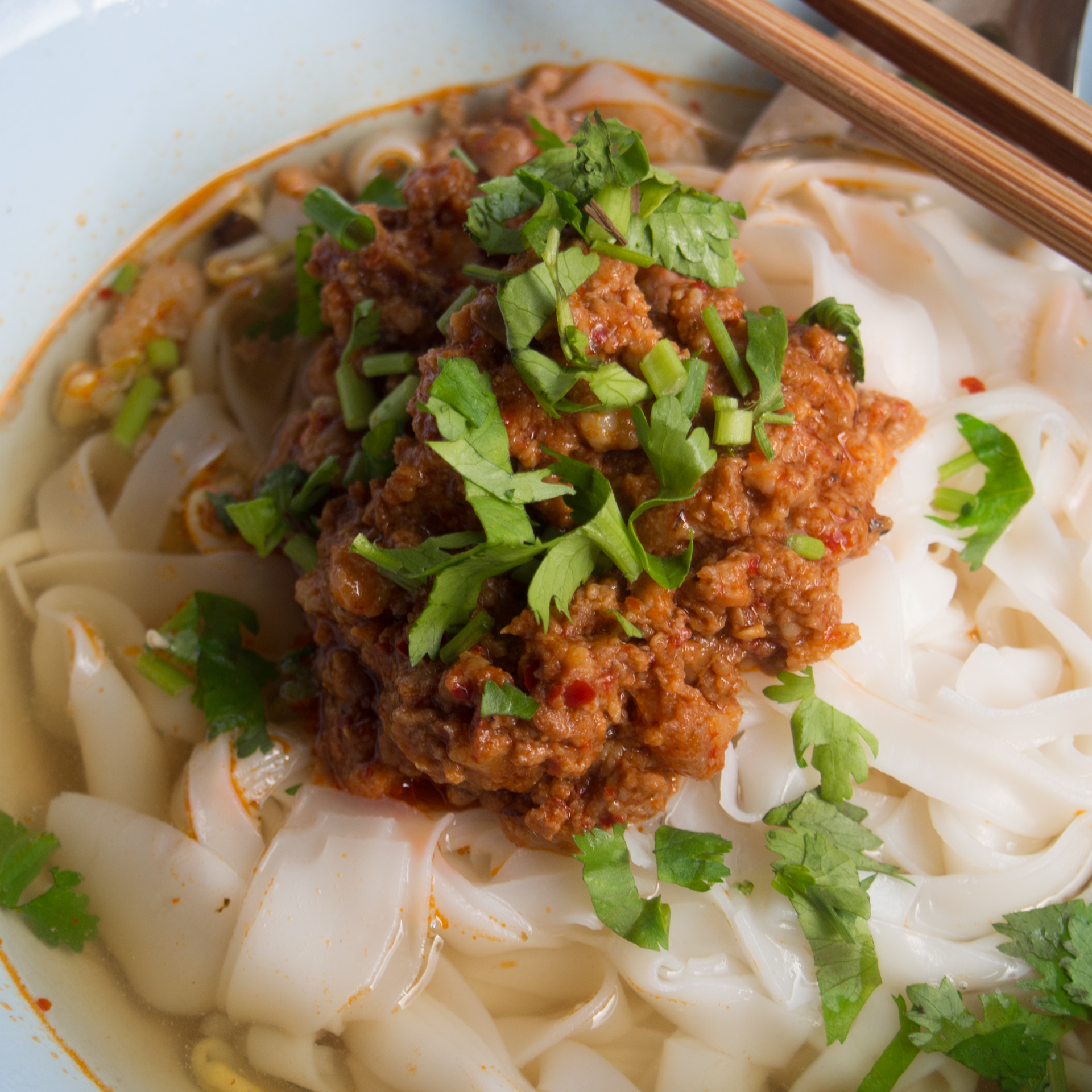
Khao soi nam na is a style of khao soi with a minced pork-and-chilli paste, that is eaten in the eastern part of Chiang Rai Province, Thailand.

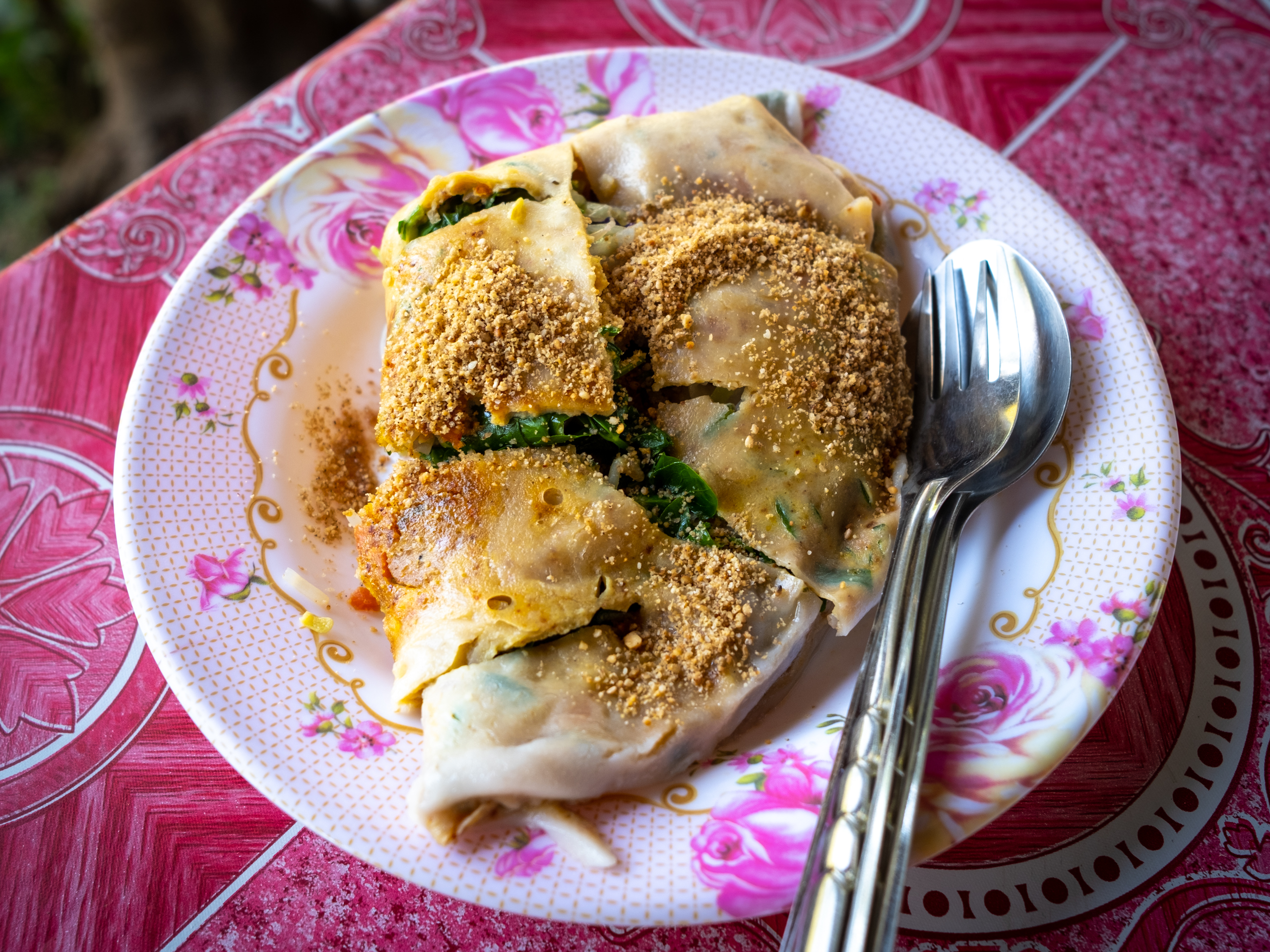
Khao soi noi songkhrueang is a Shan dish: a wrap made from steamed rice flour batter with a filling of steamed vegetables and dusted with ground peanuts.

== See also ==
- List of soups
- Mi kari
- Khow suey
- Laksa
- Thai curry
