= Khow suey =

Burmese noodle dish

Khausa
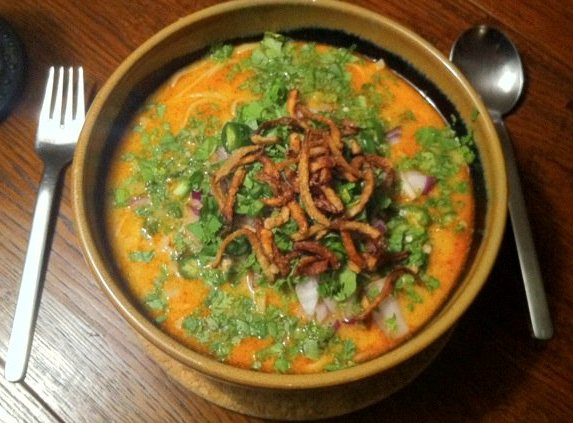
- Alternative names: Khow suey; khousay; khausey
- Type: Noodle soup
- Place of origin: Burma
- Region or state: Lower Burma
- Main ingredients: spaghetti, curried beef or chicken, dahi (yoghurt), gram flour
- Variations: Ohn no khao swè
- Similar dishes: Laksa, khao soi

Khausa (Memoni: ખાવસા) or khow suey (Hindi: खाओ सुए, from Burmese: ခေါက်ဆွဲ) is a South Asian noodle soup derived from the Burmese dish ohn no khao swè. Popular among the Memon community in India and Pakistan, the dish typically consists of spaghetti noodles served with a dahi (yoghurt) and gram flour-based curry and various condiments, and is often enjoyed during communal gatherings. A squeeze of lemon also adds tanginess to khow suey. When Memon businessmen were transplanted to Karachi, they adapted the dish to their liking by adding more spices. They replaced egg noodles with spaghetti since it was more easily available. Along with the noodles, they made a thick yogurt and gram flour curry as a dip. To put the icing on the cake, they added a meat gravy made from barbecued meat.

== History ==
The dish, known as ohn no khao swè, originated in Burma, and came to the Memon community of India who adapted this dish, likely coinciding with the emigration of South Asians from Burma in the 1960s, and is now a representative Memon dish known as khausa. The Memons are a Gujarati community that travelled to other nations to conduct business, earning them the title of "sailor merchants of India."

When India was partitioned in 1947, a huge number of Memons chose to leave the subcontinent. Although there were so many immigrants to the new state of Pakistan, a good number also went to Myanmar, especially Yangon.

The migration wasn't one-way traffic either, as hundreds of Myanmar people (particularly Rohingya) have also come into Pakistan.

There are no official figures, but Karachi is said to host thousands of Myanmar people. The city even has areas named “Burmee Colony” and “Rohingyabad” after the group.

== Ingredients ==
Khawsuey is a Burmese noodle dish made with egg noodles and topped with a coconut milk-based curry. The curry is usually made with chicken or beef, garlic, ginger, turmeric, and gram flour (besan) to thicken. The curry is then poured over the noodles and topped with crispy fried noodles, chopped cilantro, sliced boiled eggs, lemon wedges, green chilies, and fried onions. A dash of fish sauce or soy sauce is often added for umami, and a squeeze of lemon or lime is squeezed over the dish before serving. It is a hearty and comforting dish with a balance of creamy, spicy, and tangy flavors.
