= Lontong balap =

Indonesian rice cake dish

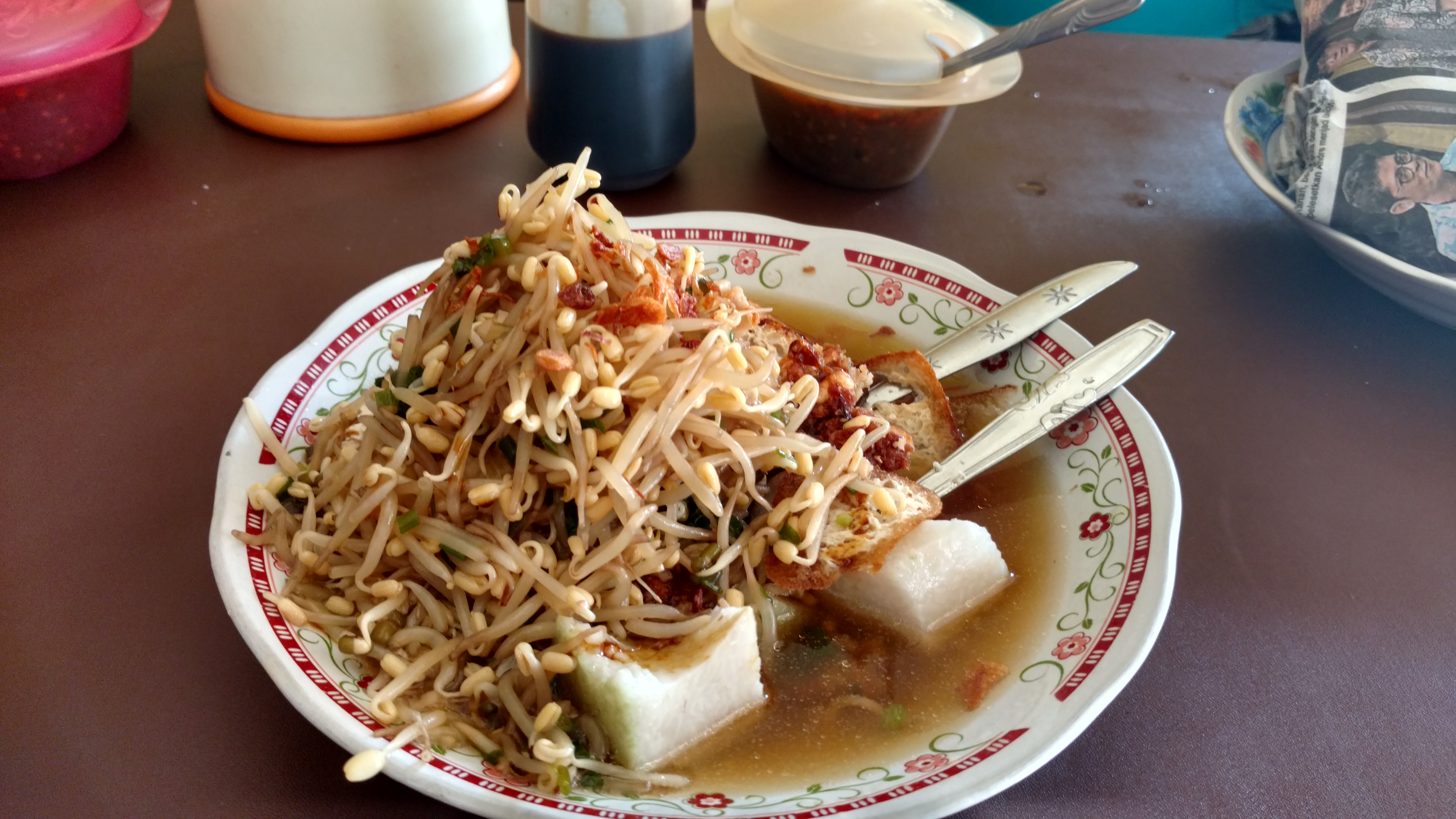
- A plate of lontong balap
- Course: Main course
- Place of origin: Indonesia
- Region or state: Java
- Created by: Javanese
- Serving temperature: Hot
- Main ingredients: Lontong, bean sprouts, fried tofu, fried mashed beans, fried shallots, sambal petis and sweet soy sauce

Lontong balap (lit. racing rice cake) (Javanese: ꦭꦺꦴꦤ꧀ꦛꦺꦴꦁꦧꦭꦥ꧀, romanized: lonthong balap) is an Indonesian traditional rice dish, well known in Javanese cuisine, made of lontong (pressed rice cake), tauge (bean sprouts), fried tofu, lentho (black-eyed pea fritter), fried shallots, sambal petis and sweet soy sauce. East Javanese lontong and tofu recipes are known of their distinctive flavour, acquired from generous amount of petis (a type of shrimp paste). The origin of the dish is from Surabaya in East Java, Indonesia.

== See also ==
- Lontong
- Arem-arem
- Lontong cap go meh
- Lontong dekem
- Lontong kari
- Lontong sayur
