= Lontong sayur =

Indonesian rice cake dish

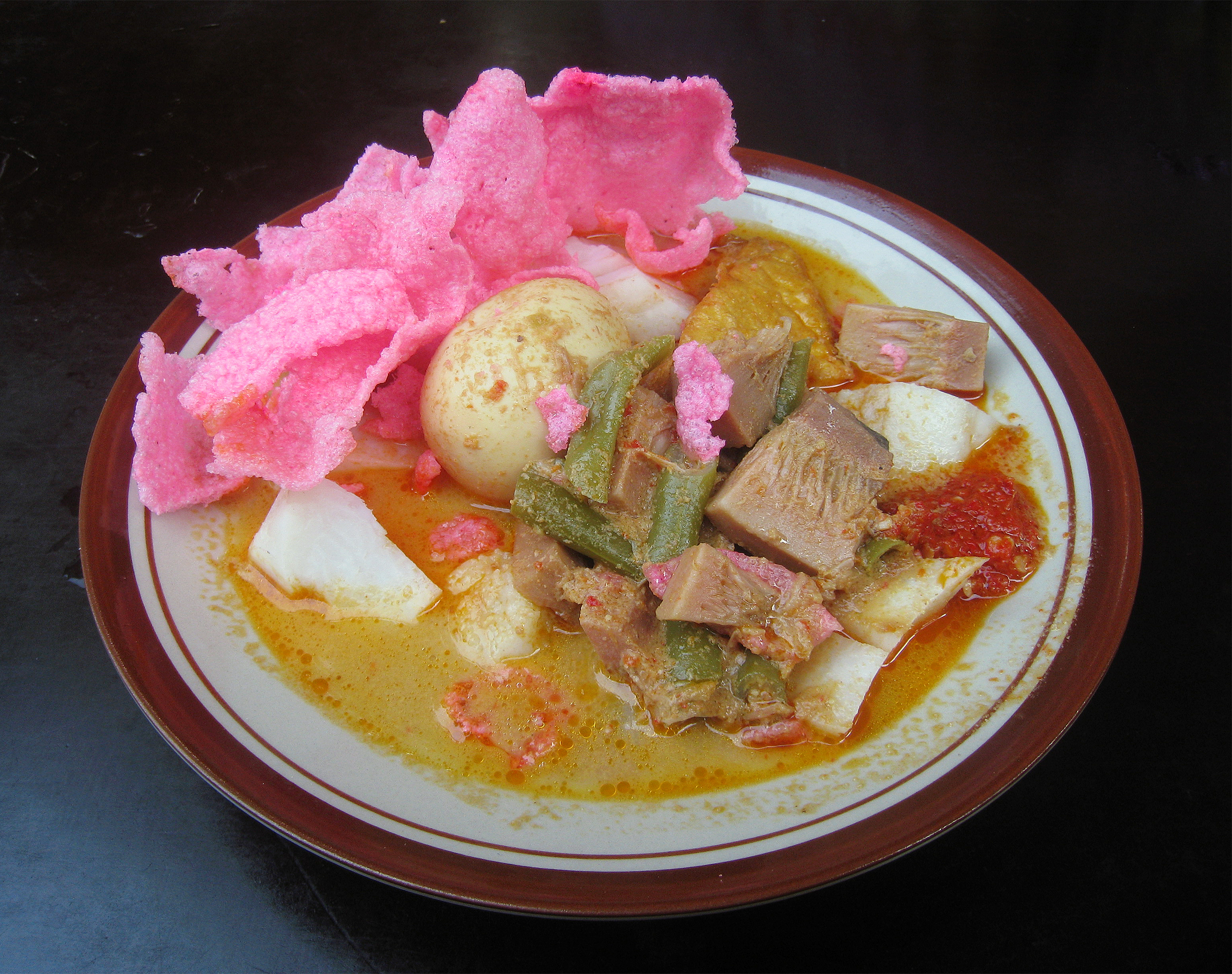
- A plate of lontong sayur
- Course: Main course
- Place of origin: Indonesia
- Region or state: Sumatra and Java
- Created by: Betawi and Minangkabau
- Serving temperature: Hot
- Main ingredients: Lontong, coconut milk soup, shredded chayote, tempeh, tofu, hard-boiled egg, sambal and krupuk

Lontong sayur (lit. vegetable rice cake) is an Indonesian traditional rice dish made of pieces of lontong served in coconut milk soup with shredded chayote, green bean, unripe jackfruit, tempeh, tofu, hard-boiled egg, sambal and krupuk.

Lontong sayur is related and quite similar to ketupat sayur and is a favourite breakfast menu next to bubur ayam and nasi uduk. The dish is found in Betawi, and Minangkabau cuisine.

== See also ==
- Lontong
- Arem-arem
- Lontong balap
- Lontong cap go meh
- Lontong dekem
- Lontong kari
