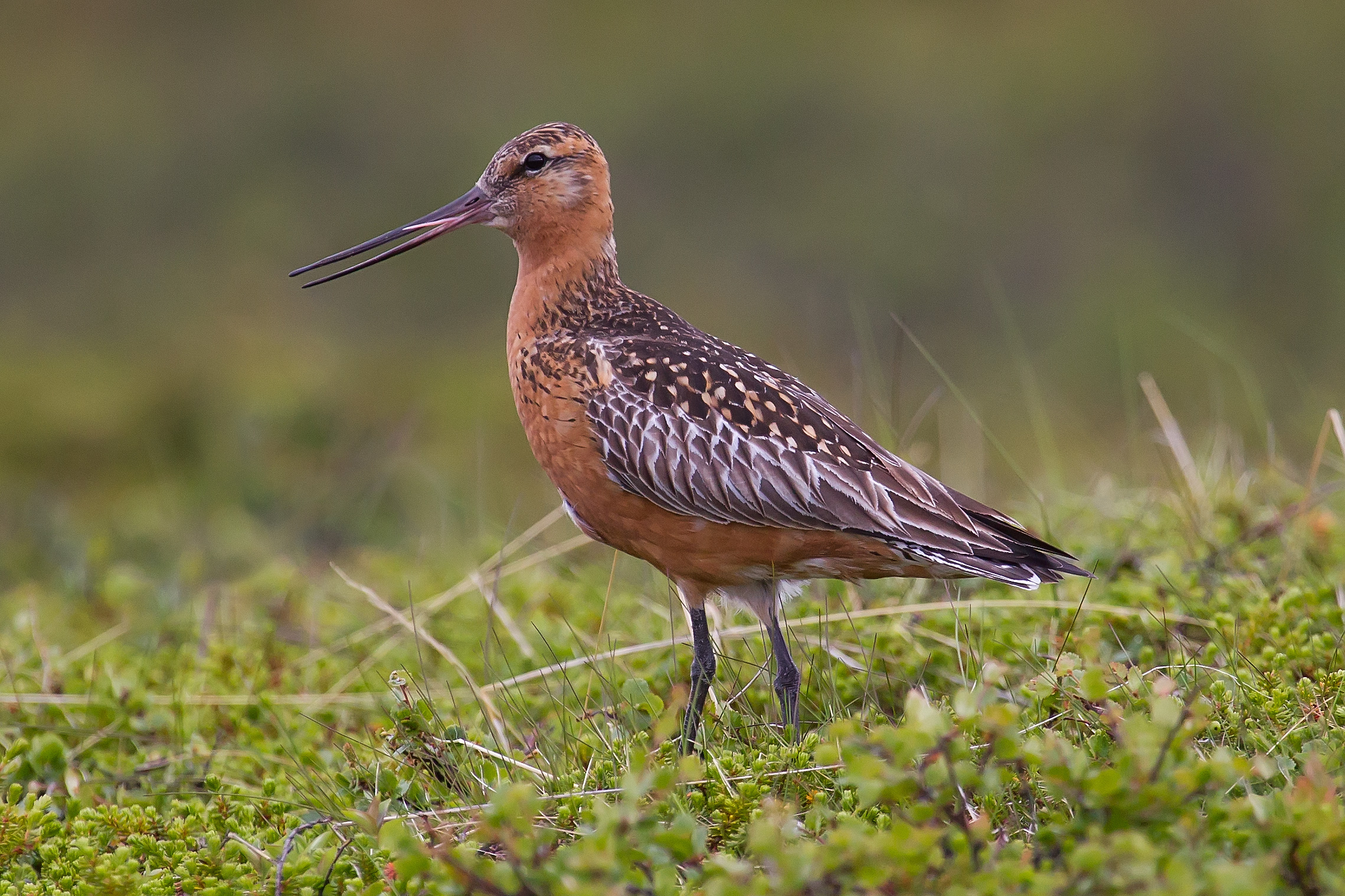
- L. l. lapponica male in breeding plumage, Varanger Peninsula, Norway
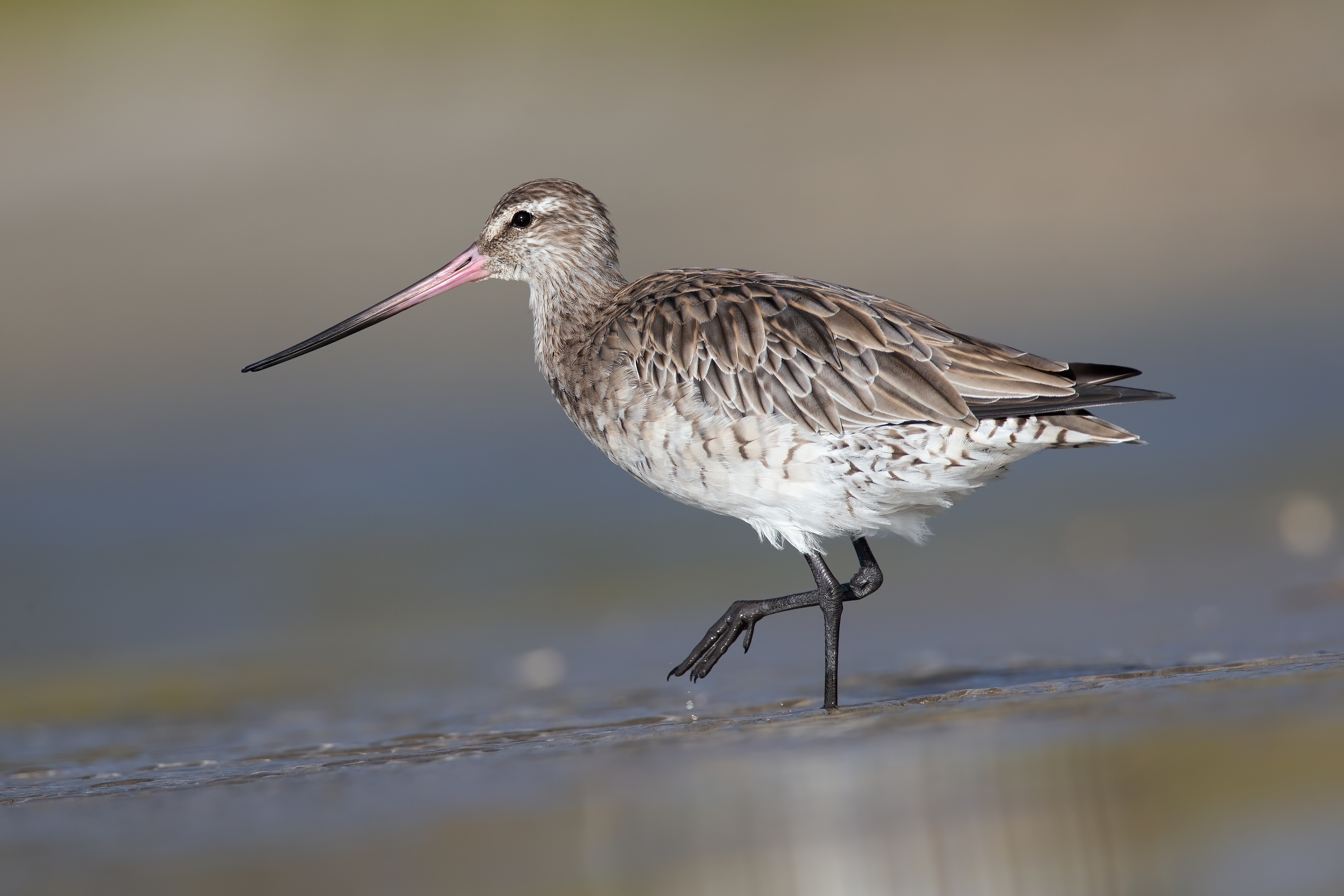
- L. l. baueri in non-breeding plumage, New South Wales, Australia

Conservation status
- Near Threatened (IUCN 3.1)

Scientific classification
- Kingdom: Animalia
- Phylum: Chordata
- Class: Aves
- Order: Charadriiformes
- Family: Scolopacidae
- Genus: Limosa
- Species: L. lapponica

Binomial name
- Limosa lapponica (Linnaeus, 1758)
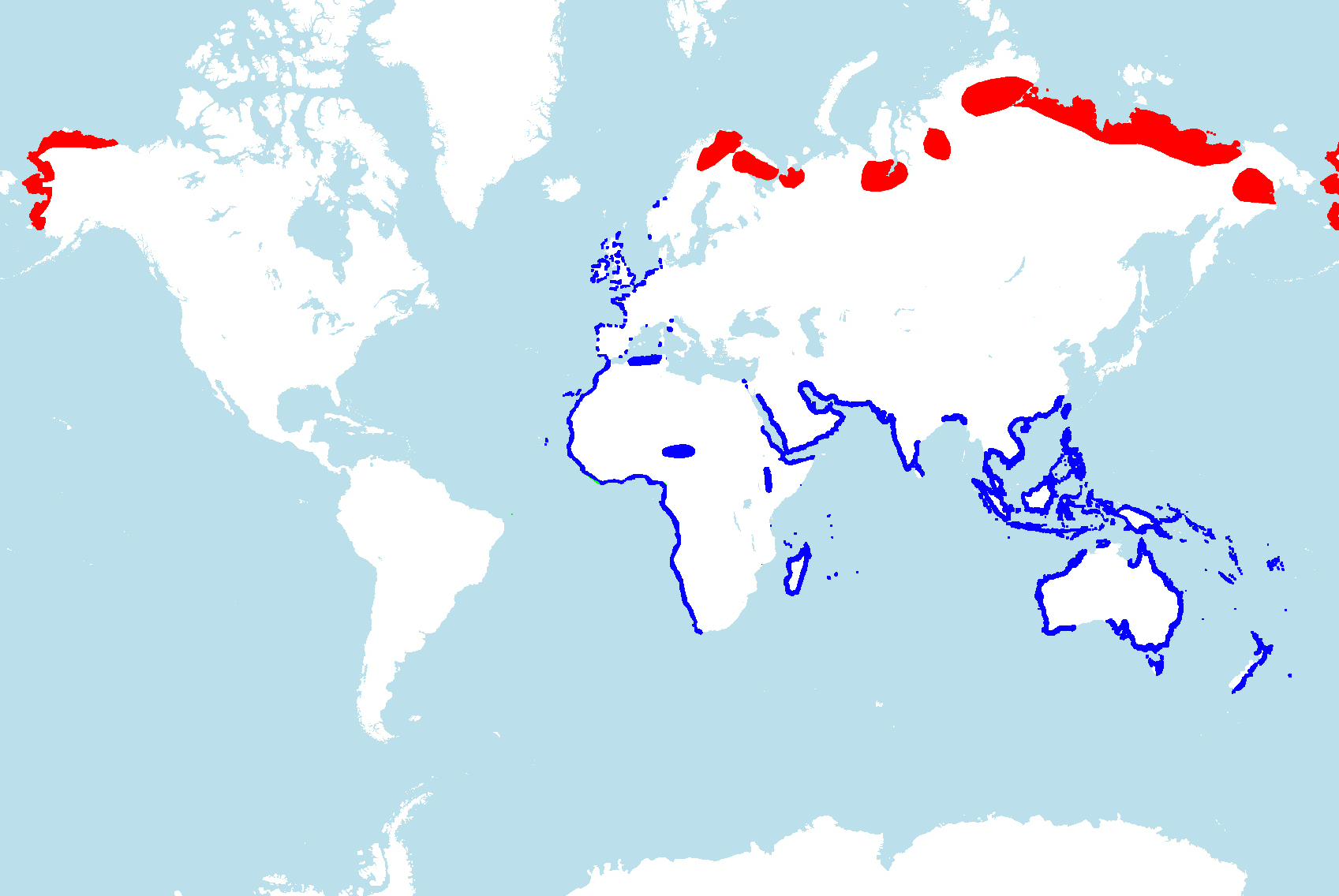
- Range map; red = breeding, blue = winter

Synonyms
- Scolopax lapponica Linnaeus, 1758

= Bar-tailed godwit =

Species of bird

The bar-tailed godwit (Limosa lapponica) is a large and strongly migratory wader in the family Scolopacidae, which feeds on bristle-worms and shellfish on coastal mudflats and estuaries. It has distinctive red breeding plumage, long legs, and a long upturned bill. Bar-tailed godwits breed on Arctic coasts and tundra from Scandinavia to Alaska, and overwinter on coasts in temperate and tropical regions of Australia and New Zealand. The migration of the subspecies Limosa lapponica baueri across the Pacific Ocean from Alaska to New Zealand is the longest known non-stop flight of any bird, and also the longest journey without pausing to feed by any animal. The round-trip migration for this subspecies is over 29,000 km (18,020 mi).

== Taxonomy ==
The bar-tailed godwit was formally described by the Swedish naturalist Carl Linnaeus in 1758 in the tenth edition of his Systema Naturae under the binomial name Scolopax limosa. It is now placed with three other godwits in the genus Limosa that was introduced by the French zoologist Mathurin Jacques Brisson in 1760. The genus name Limosa is from Latin and means "muddy", from limus, "mud", referring to its preferred habitat. The specific name lapponica refers to Lapland.

The English term "godwit" was first recorded in about 1416–17 and may be an imitation of the bird's call, or be derived from the Old English "god whit", meaning "good creature", perhaps referring to its eating qualities. Its English name is taken from the black-and-white barred tail and upper tail coverts in this species.

Five subspecies are currently recognised, listed from west to east:

- L. l. lapponica (Linnaeus, 1758) – breeds from northern Scandinavia east to the Yamal Peninsula; winters western coasts of Europe and Africa from the British Isles and the Netherlands south to South Africa, and also around the Persian Gulf. Smallest subspecies, males up to 360 g (13 oz), females to 450 g (16 oz). Population recently revised down to below 30,000 individuals; earlier citations of 150,000–180,000 individuals from winter counts being overestimates due to previously overlooked intermingling with L. l. taymyrensis in winter.
- L. l. yamalensis Bom et al. 2022 – breeds in northwest Siberia including the Yamal Peninsula and the lower Ob River valley; winters in Oman east to west India, and probably the coast of east Africa, perhaps south to South Africa. Doubtfully distinct from L. l. taymyrensis, not distinguishable genetically.
- L. l. taymyrensis Engelmoer & Roselaar, 1998 – breeds in central north Siberia from the lower Yenisei River valley east to the lower Anabar River valley; winters on the coasts of western Europe south to western Africa, overlapping extensively with L. l. lapponica.
- L. l. menzbieri – Portenko, 1936 – breeds northeastern Asia from the Anabar River east to the Kolyma River delta; winters in southeast Asia and northwest Australia
- L. l. baueri – Naumann, 1836 – breeds in Chukotka to north and west Alaska; winters in Australasia. Largest subspecies; includes L. l. anadyrensis. Population is less than 150,000 birds, with 75,000 of them wintering in New Zealand.

== Description ==
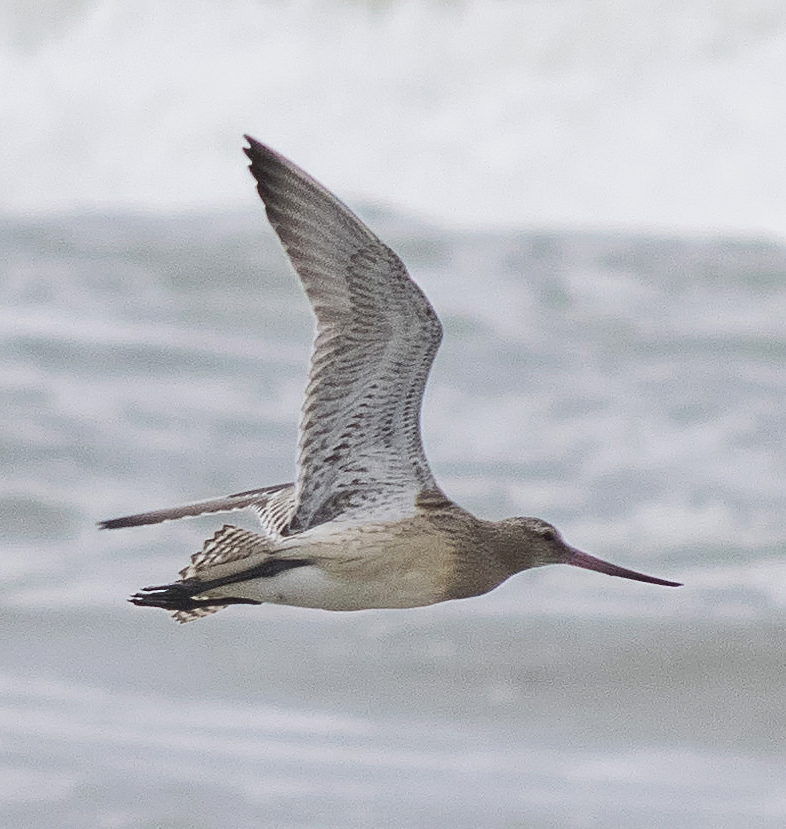
In flight, showing tail barring

Limosa lapponica, Finland

The bar-tailed godwit is a relatively short-legged species of godwit. The bill-to-tail length is 37–41 cm (15–16 in), with a wingspan of 70–80 cm (28–31 in). Males average smaller than females but with much overlap; males weigh 190–400 g (6.7–14.1 oz), while females weigh 260–630 g (9.2–22.2 oz); there is also some regional variation in size (see subspecies, below). The adult has blue-grey legs and a long, tapering, slightly upturned bi-coloured bill, pink at the base and black towards the tip. The neck, breast and belly are unbroken brick red in breeding plumage, and dark brown above. Females breeding plumage is much duller than males, with a chestnut to cinnamon belly. Breeding plumage is not fully apparent until the third year, and there are three distinguishable age classes; during their first migration north, immature males are noticeably paler in colour than more mature males. Non-breeding birds seen in the Southern Hemisphere are plain grey-brown with darker feather centres, giving them a striped look, and are whitish underneath. Juveniles are similar to non-breeding adults but more buff overall with streaked plumages on flanks and breast.

Alaska-breeding bar-tailed godwits show an increase in body size from north to south, but this trend is not apparent in their non-breeding grounds in New Zealand; birds of different sizes mix freely.

The bar-tailed godwit is distinguished from the black-tailed godwit (Limosa limosa) by its black-and-white horizontally-barred (rather than wholly black) tail, and lack of white wing bars. The most similar species is the Asian dowitcher (Limnodromus semipalmatus).

== Distribution and migration ==
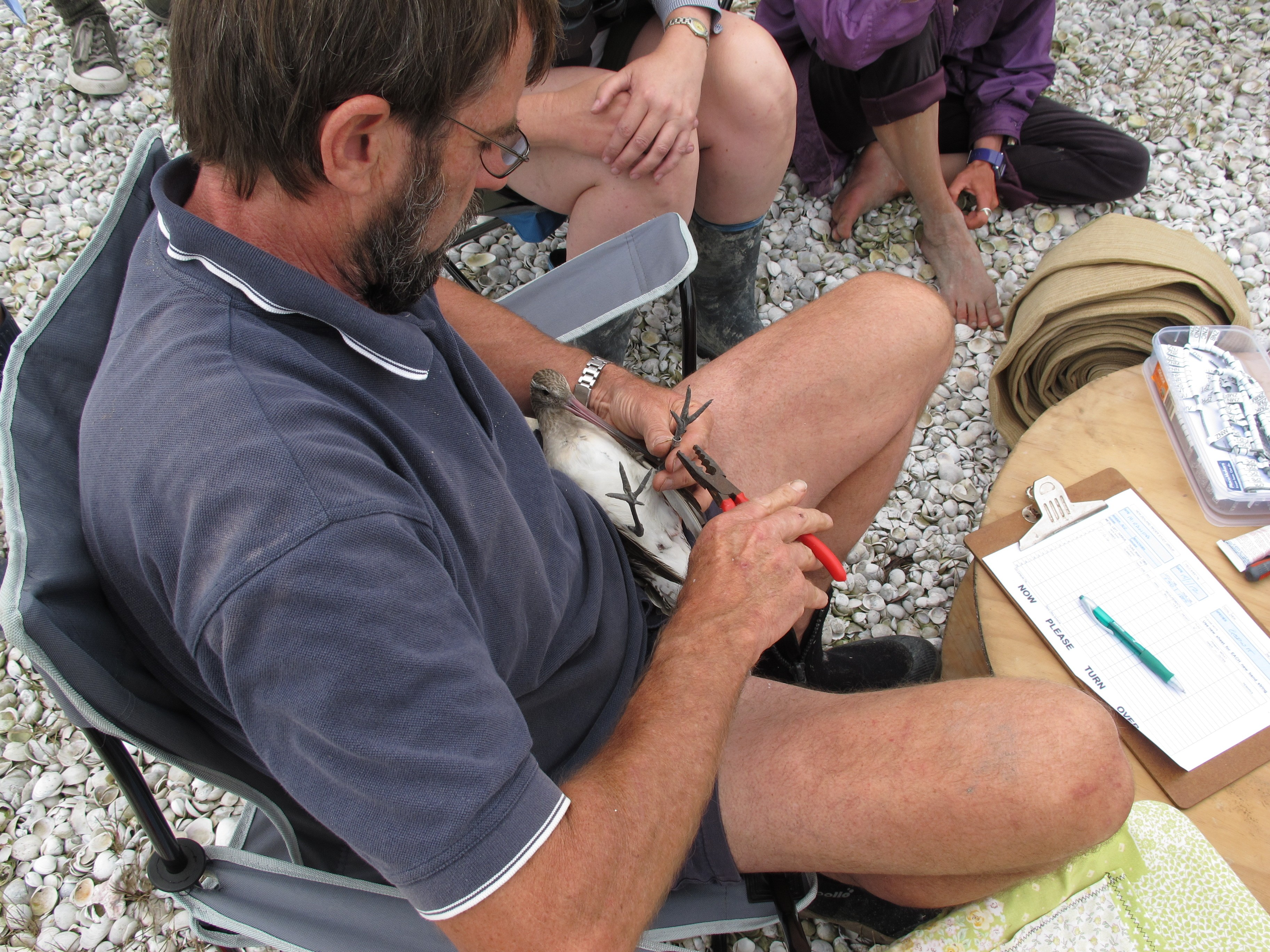
Banding L. l. baueri at Miranda Shorebird Centre, New Zealand

It was evident for some time that the migrating birds can fly distances up to 5000 km non stop. All bar-tailed godwits spend the Northern Hemisphere summer in the Arctic, where they breed, and make a long-distance migration south in winter to more temperate areas. L. l. lapponica make the shortest migration, some only as far as the North Sea, while others travel as far as India. Bar-tailed godwits nesting in Alaska (L. l. baueri) travel all the way to Australia and New Zealand. They undertake the longest non-stop migrations of any bird, and to fuel they carry the greatest fat loads of any migratory bird so far studied, reducing the size of their digestive organs to do so.

L. l. baueri breeds in Alaska and spends the non-breeding season in eastern Australia and New Zealand. L. l. menzbieri breeds in Siberia and migrates to northern and western Australia. Birds breeding in Siberia follow the coast of Asia northwards and southwards, but those breeding in Alaska migrate directly across the Pacific to Australasia 11,000 km (7,000 mi) away. To track the return journey, seven birds in New Zealand were tagged with surgically implanted transmitters and tracked by satellite to the Yellow Sea in China, a distance of 9,575 km (5,950 mi); the actual track flown by one bird was 11,026 km (6,851 mi), taking nine days. At least three other bar-tailed godwits also appear to have reached the Yellow Sea after non-stop flights from New Zealand.

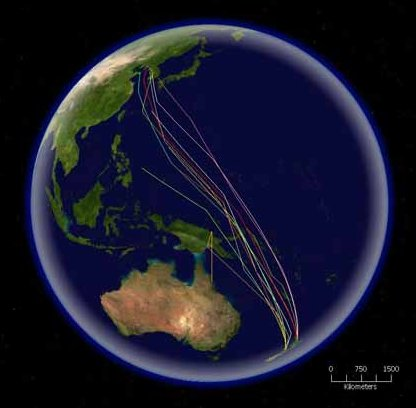
Routes of satellite tagged bar-tailed godwits migrating north from New Zealand to Korea and China

One specific female of the flock, flagged 'E7', flew onward from China to Alaska and stayed there for the breeding season. Then in August 2007 she departed on an eight-day non-stop flight from western Alaska to the Piako River near Thames, setting a new known flight record of 11,680 km (7,260 mi). This L. l. baueri female made a 174-day round-trip journey of 29,280 km (18,190 mi) with 20 days of flying. In 2021, a male bar-tailed godwit, 4BBRW, set a new record for non-stop migratory flight with an 13,000 km (8,100 mi), flight from Alaska to New South Wales. The same individual held a previous record in 2020. In 2022, a juvenile godwit flagged 'B6' left Alaska on 13 October and flew non-stop to Tasmania, the first time a tagged bird has flown this route. It flew a minimum of 13,560 km (8,430 mi) in 11 days 1 hour, a record non-stop distance.

To fuel such long journeys, L. l. baueri birds in New Zealand deposit much more fat for their body size than other subspecies, allowing them to fly 6,000–8,600 km (3,700–5,300 mi). Both Australasian subspecies head north to their breeding grounds along the coast of Asia to the Yalu Jiang coastal wetland in the north Yellow Sea, the most important staging grounds for godwits and great knots (Calidris tenuirostris) in their northern migration. L. l. baueri birds rested for about 41 days before continuing approximately 7,000 km (4,350 mi) on to Alaska. L. l. menzbieri spent on average 38 days in the Yellow Sea region and flew an additional 4,100 km (2,500 mi) to high Arctic Russia.

Birds will often depart early from New Zealand if there are favourable winds; they seem to be able to predict weather patterns that will assist them on the entire migration route. Birds that had nested in southern Alaska were larger and departed New Zealand earliest; this pattern was repeated six months later, with birds departing Alaska in the same order they arrived, and over the same span of days. Birds in southern New Zealand departed on average 9–11 days earlier than birds in more northern sites. Godwits arrive at the Yukon-Kuskokwim Delta in Alaska in two waves; local breeders in early May, and larger flocks in the third week of May en route to breeding grounds further north.

== Behaviour and ecology ==
=== Breeding ===
Birds first depart for their northern hemisphere breeding sites at age 2–4. Breeding take place each year in Scandinavia, northern Asia, and Alaska. The nest is a shallow cup in moss sometimes lined with vegetation. Clutch size is from two to five, averaging four. Both sexes share incubation of the eggs for 20 to 21 days, the male during the day and the female at night. The young fledge when they are around 28 days old. They first breed when aged two years. The earliest clutch may start by mid-May on coastal Yukon-Kuskokwim Delta. There are never 2 broods at once but it may replace the first clutch. The nest site is variable in selection where there is a slightly elevated ridge drier than surrounding vegetation. The site is frequently well concealed by standing vegetation and placed near or between tussocks. The construction of the nest is conducted by both parents which lining is added to the nest during egg laying. The eggs shape are pointed oval to pyriform and subpyriform to ovate pyriform and usually the latter eggs are elongate ovate.

=== Food and feeding ===
Limosa lapponica in winter plumage on Netherlands mudflats

Their main source of food in wetlands is bristle-worms (up to 70%), supplemented by small bivalves and crustaceans. In wet pastures, bar-tailed godwits eat invertebrates. In a major staging site in the northern Yellow Sea, they continue to hunt bristle-worms, but most of their food intake is the bivalve mollusc Potamocorbula laevis, which they generally swallow whole.

Male bar-tailed godwits are smaller than females and have shorter bills, which leads to sexually dimorphic feeding strategies and differences in foraging behaviour that enables more effective exploitation. For example, in a study of birds at the Manawatū Estuary, shorter-billed birds (males) fed mostly on small surface prey like Potamopyrgus snails, half being snail specialists, whereas females consumed more deeply-buried prey such as worms; the birds also displayed some individual food preferences. In another study in the Wadden Sea, females primarily ate lugworms and ragworms while males relied almost exclusively on mud shrimps. This study was the first to document these godwits relying on mud shrimp.

They are known to forage actively in the day and night. They will pick items on the surface while walking or probes for items in matted vegetation by inserting and twisting bills. In Europe, the females tend to feed in deeper water than males. Males that feed in deeper water are less successful than males that feed in the tide line. Meanwhile, females are successful at both locations. Birds that prey in flocks have higher prey capture than birds that prey alone. The individuals also capture fewer prey when there is drop in ambient temperature that slows the activity of prey. The degree of feeding activity depends on the tide, weather, season and the behaviour exhibited by the prey. In New Zealand, female L. l. baueri have a probe rate of 26.5 probes per 4 minutes period which is 1.6 times higher than that of males but the feeding success is observed to be similar in both sexes. The tapping technique is seen to be more useful in males than the females.

=== Sexual and antagonistic behaviour ===
During breeding season, shore birds such as bar-tailed godwit will exhibit conspicuous acts such as song flight, courtship, copulation and antagonistic behaviour. They can produce nine different vocalizations with increasing and decreasing frequency which are mostly a repetition of basic tonal element of 0.15-0.2s. Some vocalizations have multiple functions and some calls is used in a same context which is commonly shown in other shorebirds. The most common song-flight they have done is the ceremonial flights. ceremonial flights are performed disproportionately by the males and the function is mainly heterosexual. The flight was not found to induce ceremonial flight in neighbouring males. There are 4 stages in ceremonial flights; (1) ascent, (2) limping flight, (3) gliding, and (4) descent to attract the females.

There are 3 categories in ceremonial flights; (A) a straight line, (B) performing 1 or more circles, (C) wide circles. The ceremonial flight is also known to be similar to Black-tailed godwit. They lack the flight that corresponds to the tumbling flight and the limping flight is not so erratic as in Black-tailed Godwit. The main purpose of this flight is to announce to the females that they are not mated yet. Their territorial defence behaviour is most likely limited to male-to-male aggression on the ground and other Limosa species also do not show high level territoriality. Aggressive reaction distance is usually less than 2 m. The bar-tailed godwit does not exhibit the "tumbling flight" that the Black-tailed Godwit shows after its ascending phase, and its limping flight is much more ordered and less chaotic than that of the Black-tailed Godwit. The highly conspicuous limping flight with song in the ceremonial flight is potentially to give signalling value are pivoting take off during ascent, diving and breaking with primaries during descent and wings-high after landing. It is the most highly possible for long-distance signalling to be aimed only to a nearby mate.

Another common flight that occurs in this species is the pursuit flight which is initiated by a paired female. The males will follow closely behind. Sometimes, another male can join in if they are not mated yet. The aggressive and courtship behaviour should not be similar as the aggressive behaviour. During courtship, they tend to point their bill slightly upwards along with raising their tails while during aggression, they will point the bill downwards in a normal tail posture. It is common to perform tail-raising in this family. Nest-scraping behaviour is also shown by the ruffling of the back-feathers.

=== Migration behaviour ===
Although the immediate destinations and flight lengths of this species is unclear, potential destinations include the Yellow Sea, China, and Korea (39°45′N, 124°30′E; 9,600 km) from the Gulf of Carpentaria, Australia (17°38′S, 140°06′E; 3,800 km). Waders are known to use mostly fat to fuel their long flights that sometimes undertake 10,000 km to 29,000 km and also catabolising lean tissue from their organs. The sexual dimorphism is also thought to contribute to them having different fuel deposition. The typical shorebird fat loads are 35%-40% of their body mass. Juvenile males migrating from South Alaska have the highest fat load, but we cannot conclude that for all godwits migrating from the same breeding ground since juveniles are still growing and have smaller body sizes than adults. The female godwits are found to be the heaviest due to their body size being larger than males, and the fat content was also found to be high, from 197-280g.

In the size comparison of the subspecies with L. l. taymyrensis which is comparatively smaller than subspecies L. l. baueri. The latter is known to deposit 75-85g more fat for their size. In general, larger godwits have greater flight costs, which accounts for the difference in travel expenses. The smaller subspecies with would exhibit lower travel cost with and without wind assistance. The subspecies L. l. baueri is predicted with travel distance further than L. l. taymyrensis ranged from 8,200 to 8,600 km with wind assistance, and 6,000 to 6,300 km with no wind assistance. Those flight lengths are sufficient to allow the individuals from northern New Zealand potentially to Japan or South Korea. New Zealand godwits would need to have wind assistance comparable to L. l. taymyrensis, the European birds, or the European bird would need to retain significant amounts of fat after migration in order for the greater flight ranges to be feasible. This species is able to "ride" high-pressure systems over the Tasman Sea during the first part of their migration from New Zealand, and so they are most likely to receive wind assistance to Australia.

Sometimes during Southward migration, they will make some stopovers in different staging sites if their destinations are likely to be father north than Australia or Papua New Guinea and Irian Jaya. These massive flights might involve extensive fuelling periods before and during migration. This calls for the utilization of a flight's network of locations. They will rest, moult and refuel themselves for the remaining distance. L. l. baueri are highly conservative in their use of staging sites to refuel and most of them just stopped in one or two countries when migrating northwards. During southwards migration, some of them will stop in a few islands in the Southwest Pacific Ocean. These altered routes are suggested to be adaptive reactions to the risks of continuing to fly over open oceans when the wind is unfavourable. This migration strategy of Australasian bar-tailed godwits is exemplify by their exceptional travels, which cross hemispheres and encompass 10,000 km, and their reliance on a few number of refuelling sites. These extreme flights are also dependent on the presence and productivity of these staging sites.

== Status ==
The status of the bar-tailed godwit is Near Threatened, and the population is declining. Fewer birds have been using East African estuaries since 1979, and there has been a steady decline in numbers around the Kola Peninsula, Siberia, since 1930. The global population is estimated to number 1,100,000 individuals (770,000 – 880,000 mature individuals) as of 2025.

Both L. l. bauri and L. l. menzbieri adult survival rates decreased between 2005 and 2012, probably because of the loss of intertidal staging areas in the Yellow Sea. The construction of seawalls and the reclamation of mudflats have led to a critical reduction in food supplies for migrating birds, particularly subspecies like L. l. menzbieri that rely on the Yalu Jiang estuary on both their northward and southward migrations. Numbers of L. l. baueri have declined in New Zealand from over 100,000 in the late 1980s to 67,500 in 2018. Meanwhile, a wader census conducted Bird New Zealand in 1983 and they found that the number of bar-tailed godwits in New Zealand as well has declined over the last 35 years which drops from 101,000 in 1983–1993 to 78,000 in 2005–2019. The decline in numbers of bar-tailed godwits is probably associated with habitat loss and degradation near Yellow Sea. They are quite sensitive and easily spooked so it prevents them from disturbance at high tide roosts which leads to stress since they could not rest. In 2024, L. l. baueri and L. l. menzbieri were listed as Endangered under the Australian EPBC Act.

The bar-tailed godwit is one of the species to which the Agreement on the Conservation of African-Eurasian Migratory Waterbirds (AEWA) applies. In New Zealand the species is protected under the 1953 Wildlife Act.

== Gallery ==
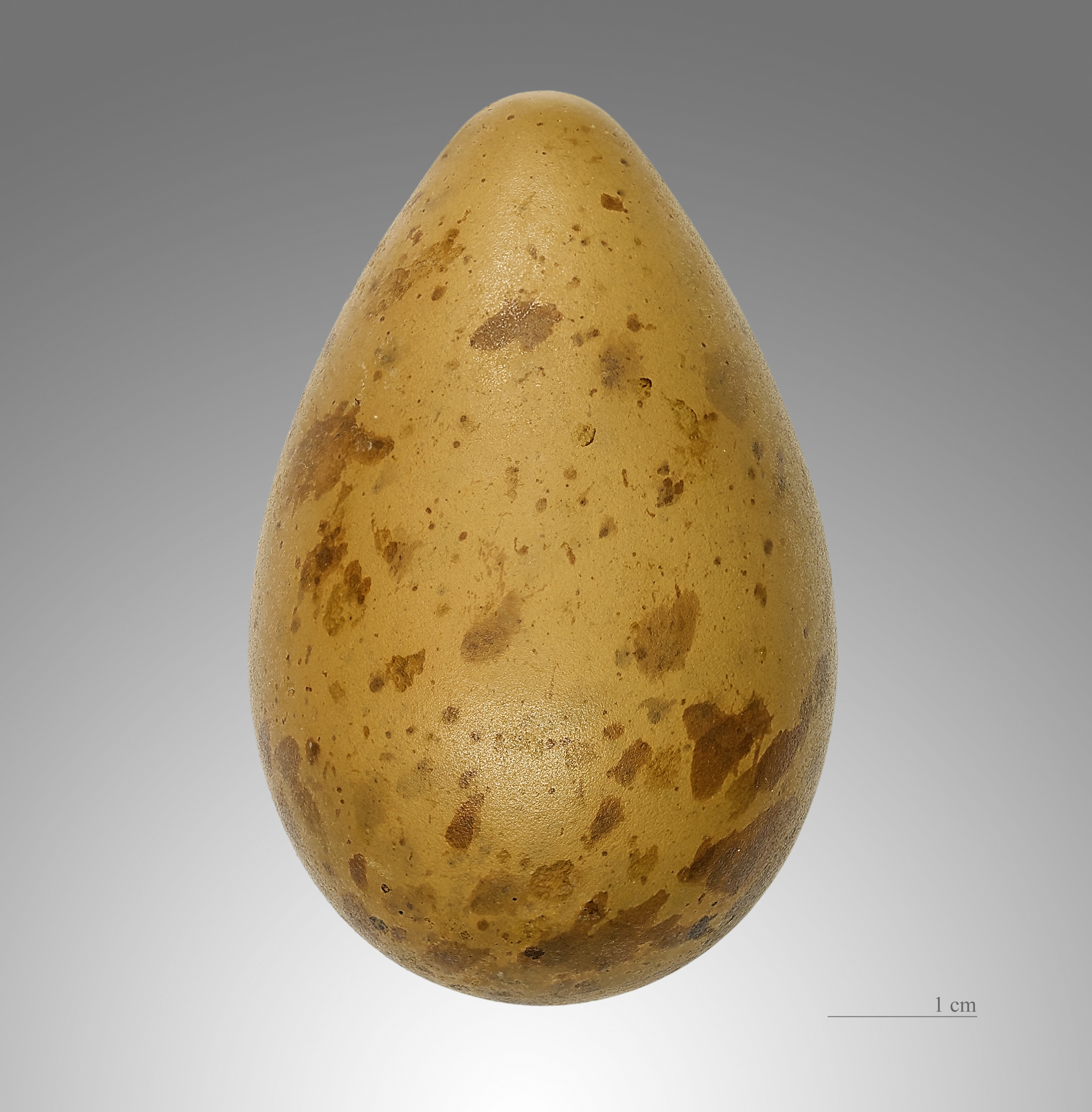
Egg

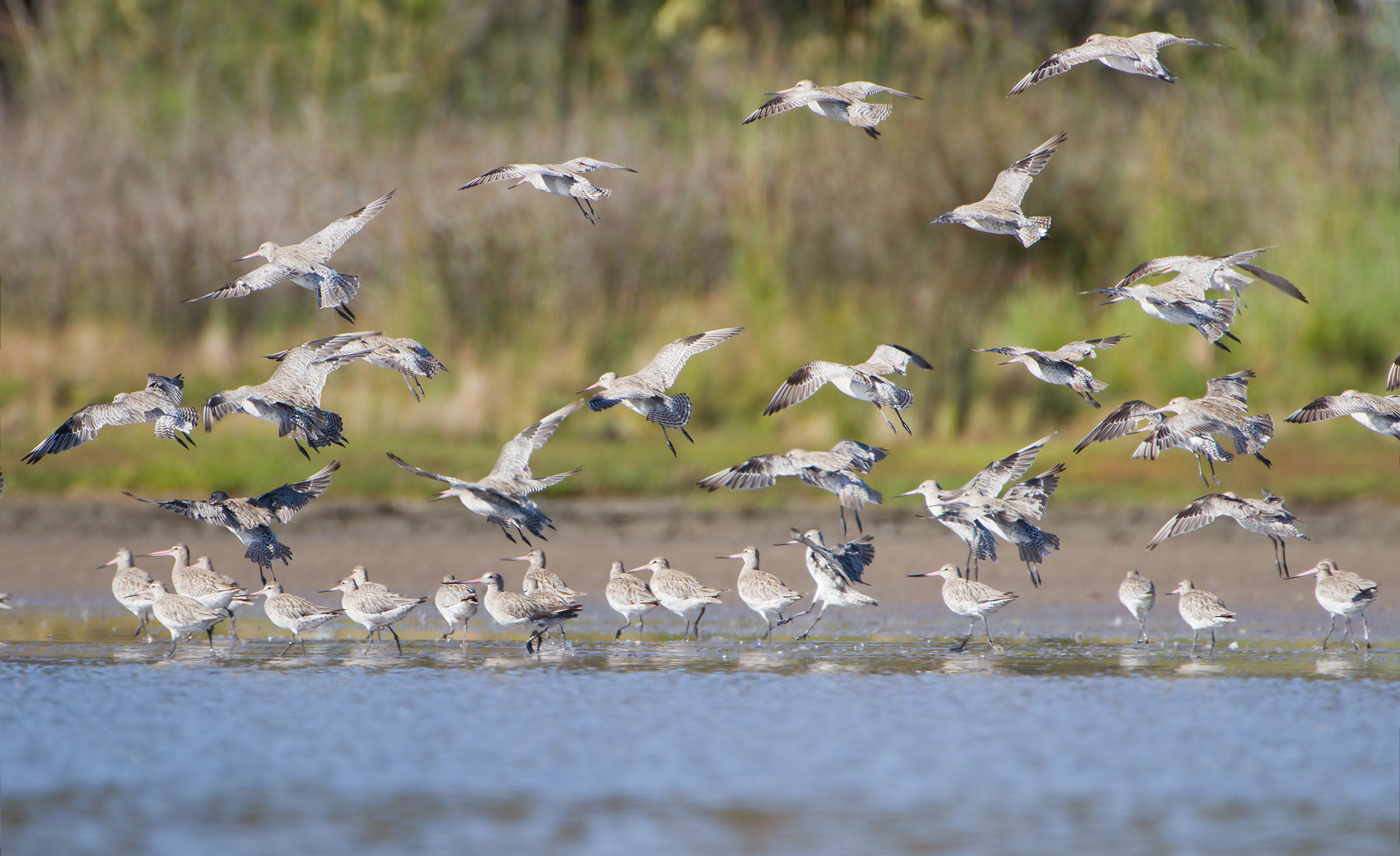
L. l. baueri in Tasmania, Australia (note the barring on the tail)

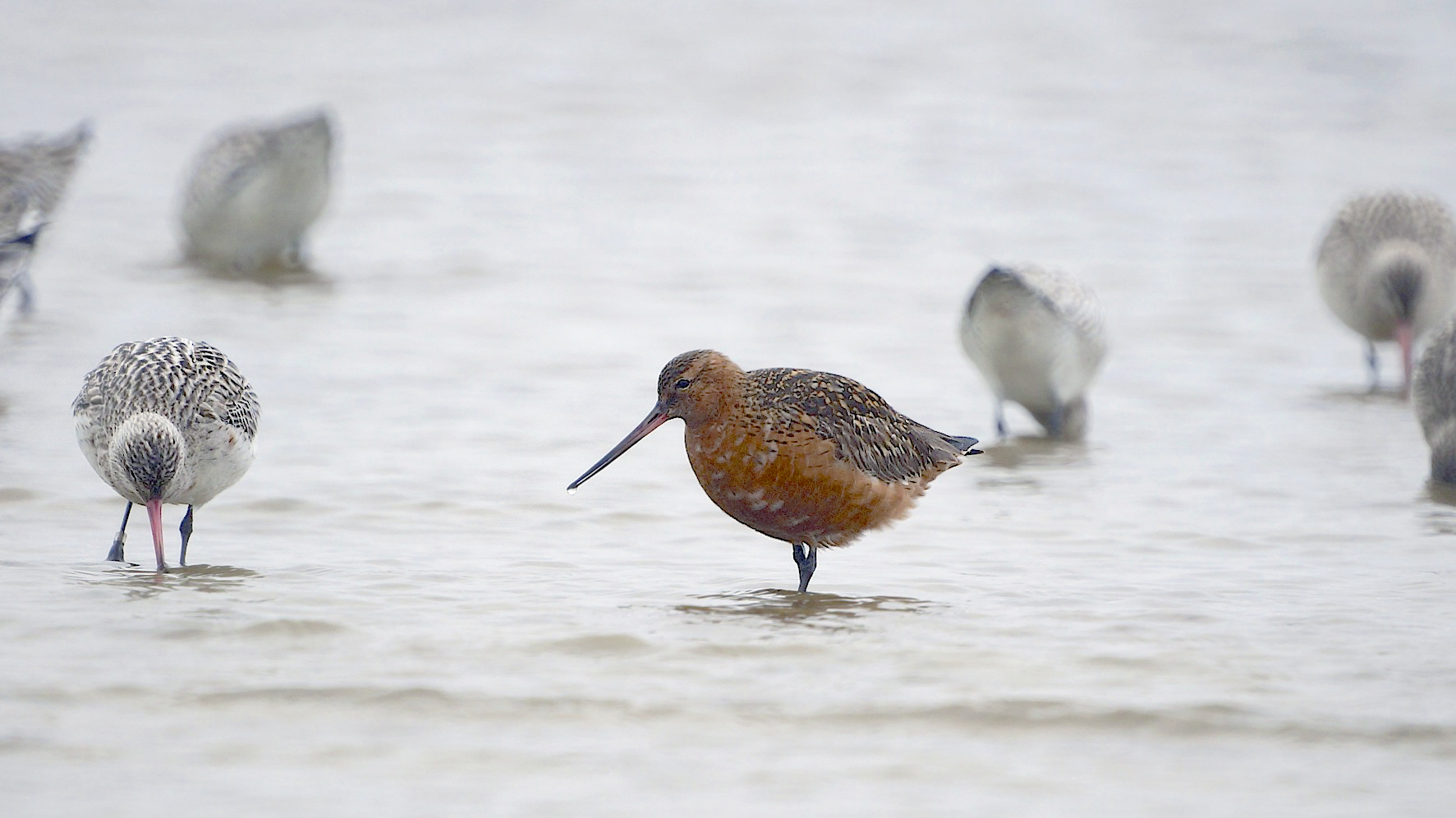
Breeding plumage at Sandbanks, Poole, Dorset

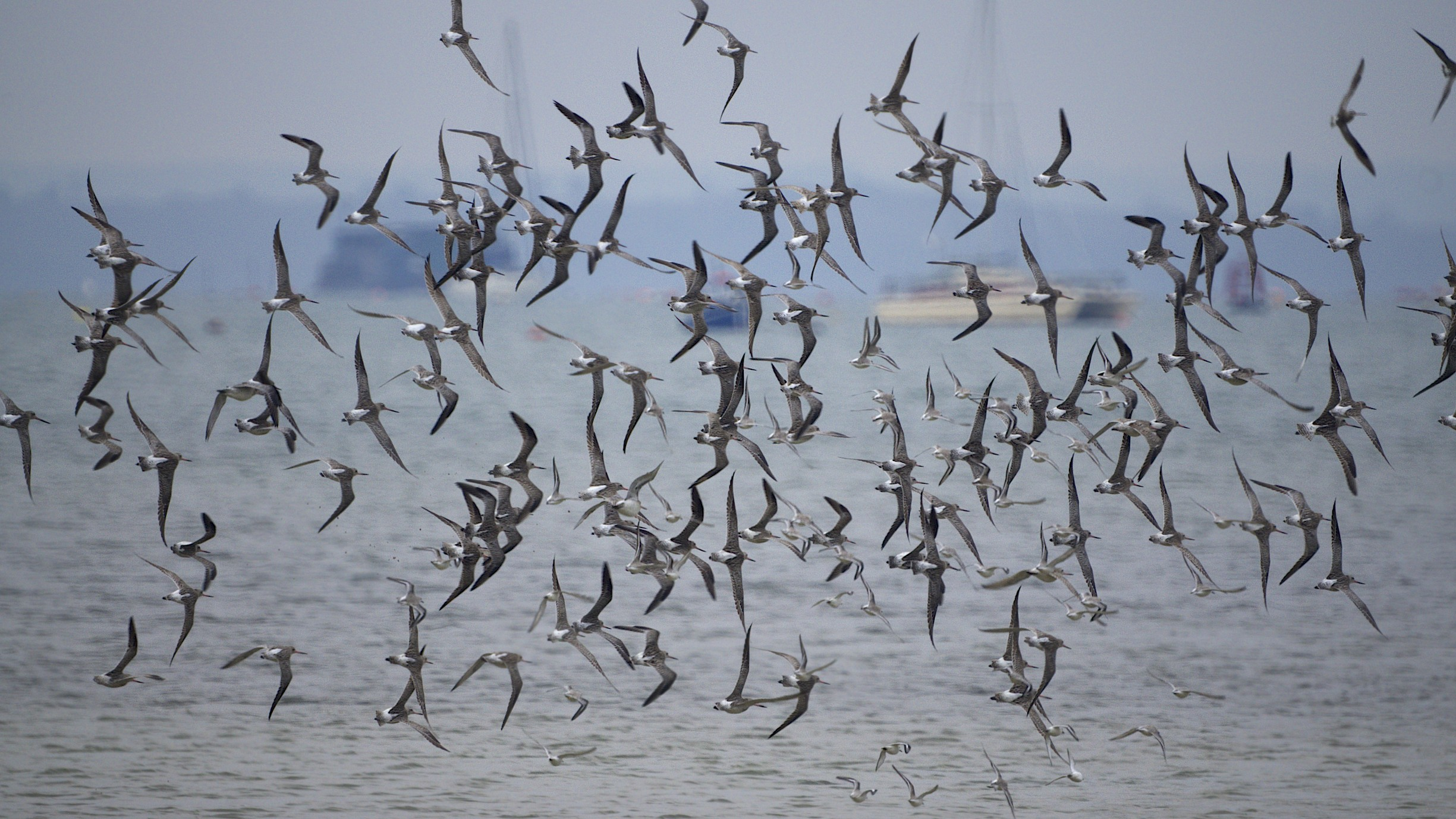
In flight, Dorset

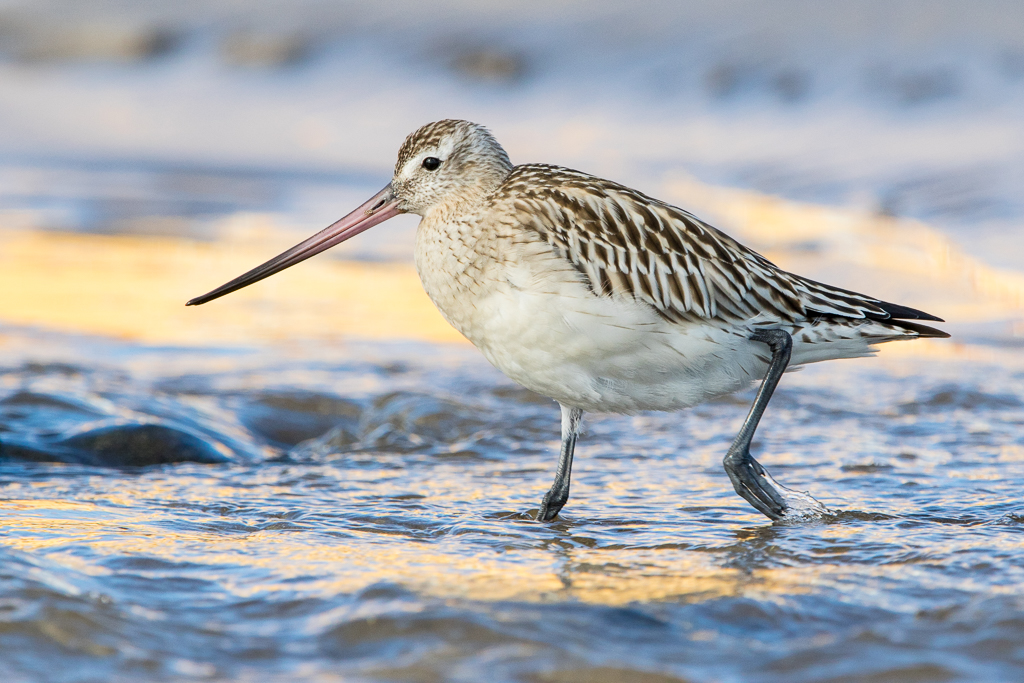
L. l. lapponica, Spain
