= Emping =

Indonesian traditional chips

Emping melinjo
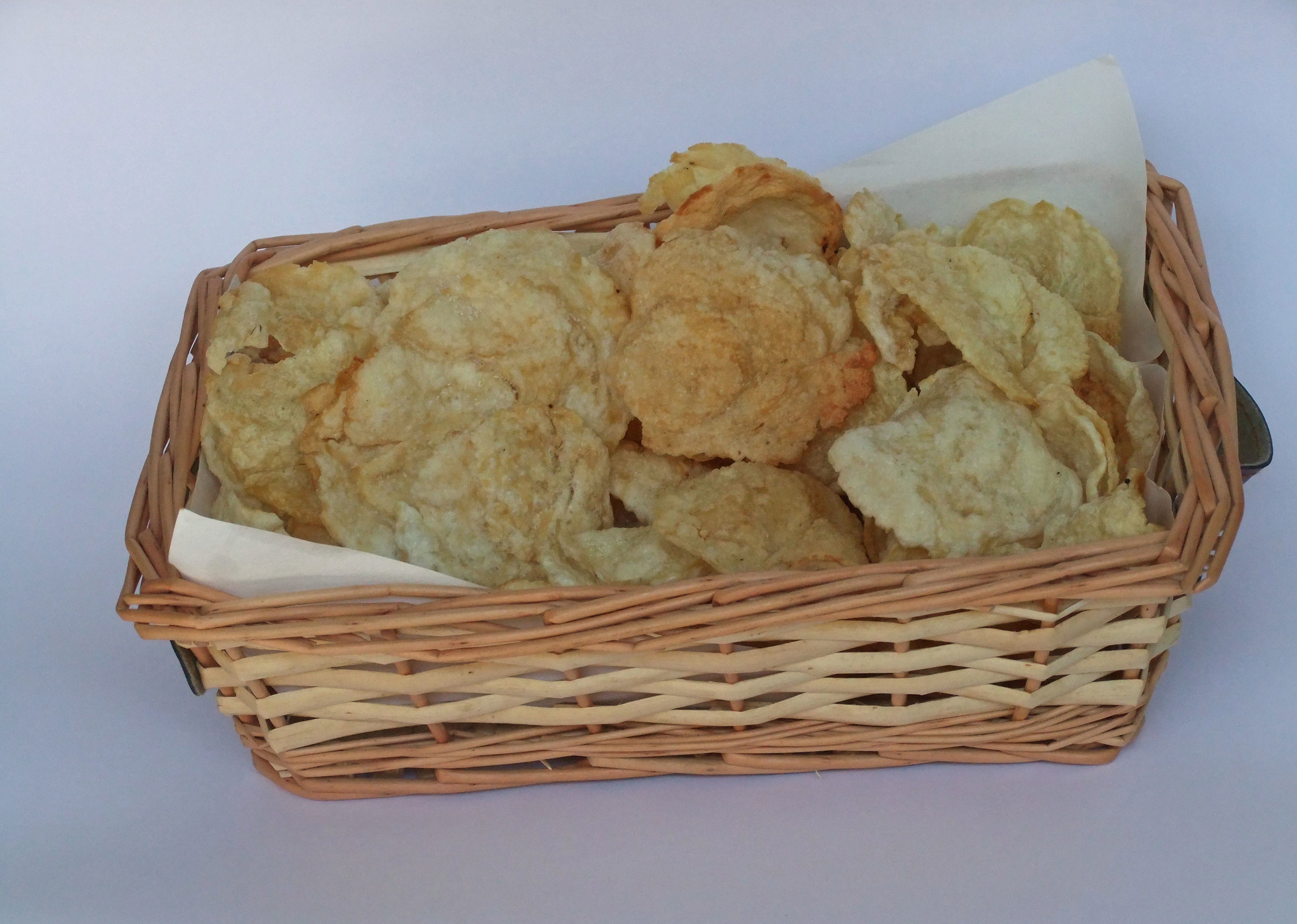
- Emping chips made from melinjo
- Course: Snack
- Region or state: Batang, Central Java, Indonesia
- Serving temperature: Room temperature
- Main ingredients: Deep fried dried Gnetum gnemon nut
- Variations: Plain, salty, sweet and spicy hot

Emping (Malay pronunciation: [əmˈpiŋ], Jawi: امڤيڠ) is a name that refers to several types of flake-like cracker or chip made from some pounded cereals and seeds known in Malaysia and Indonesia. Among the Malays, flakes made from glutinous types of rice are known as emping padi. Among the Javanese, it can also refer to chips made of melinjo or belinjo (Gnetum gnemon) nuts (which are seeds) with a slightly bitter taste known more fully as emping melinjo.

Melinjo emping or "flake" snacks are available in markets either plain (original), salty (salted), spicy, or sweet (if caramelized sugar is added).

== Production ==
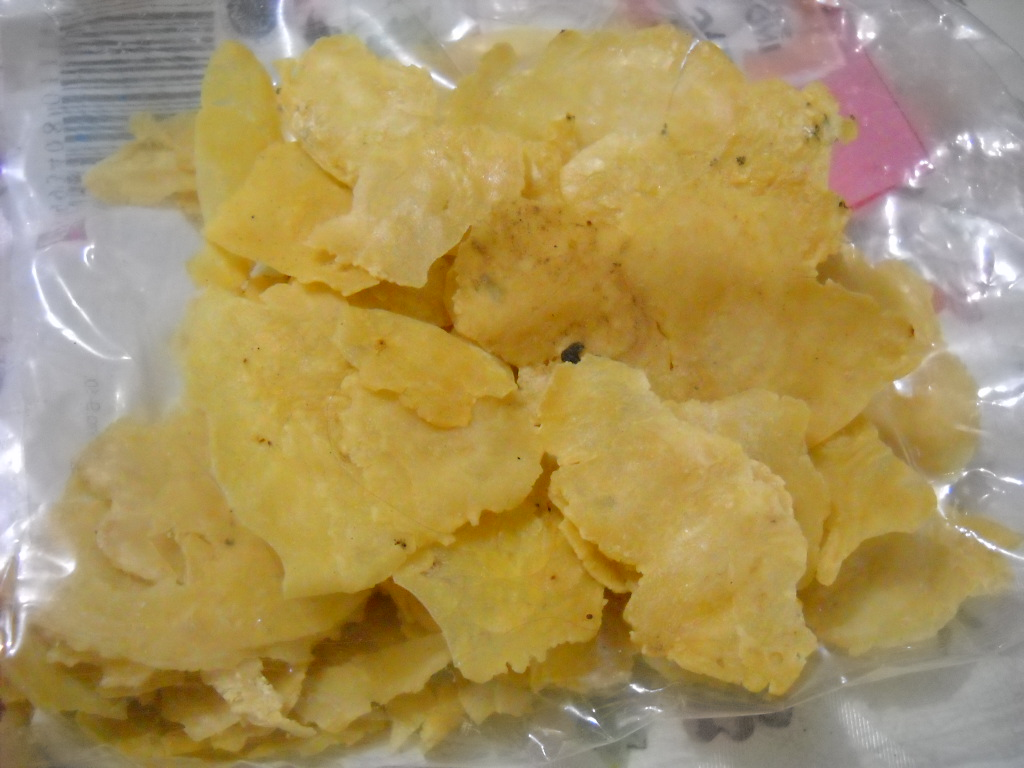
Raw melinjo emping

Production of melinjo emping is a traditional home industry, they are handmade in a labour-intensive process. The melinjo seeds are sauteed in a medium fire without oil, or sometimes using sand as a medium. Both the softer outer and the harder inner skins of the seeds are peeled off by hand; the process may be sped up by boiling the seeds prior. Each melinjo seed is struck with a wooden hammer/mallet-like instrument or pressed with a stone cylinder to create flat and round emping, and these chips are arranged in woven bamboo trays to be sun-dried for a whole day to reduce their inner humidity. A single gnetum nut can make a chip each, although there are variants that combine several seeds to create chips as large as krupuk; though they are often mixed with other types of starch, such as corn. There are two types of emping thickness available in markets: thin emping are usually plain or salty, while thick emping are usually sweet, coated with caramelized sugar, or spiced with chilli pepper.

The dried emping chips are collected, packed, and sold at traditional markets raw, then later fried with ample hot vegetable oil until they expand, becoming crispy and turning golden yellow. Emping is produced in many parts of Indonesia, from Limpung in Central Java, Pidie in Aceh to Sulawesi. However, the main production areas are in Java, with Karangtawang village in Kuningan Regency West Java; Bantul Regency in Yogyakarta; Klaten Regency and Batang Regency, in Central Java; and Magetan Regency in East Java.

== Consumption ==
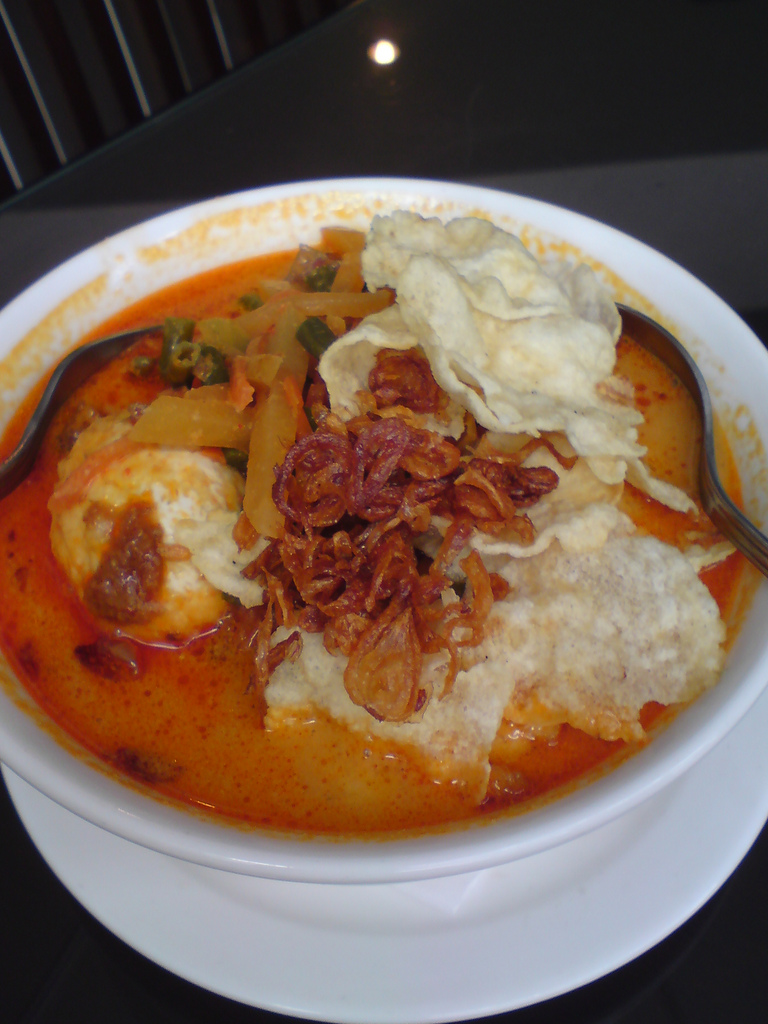
Melinjo emping as topping on lontong sayur

Raw (unfried) emping is usually available in Indonesian traditional markets, while in snack stores, supermarkets, and restaurants, mostly pre-packed, ready-to-eat emping is available. Most emping are flavoured (original), and served with a pinch of salt. Emping has been exported to the Netherlands, the United States and the Middle East. In the Netherlands, due to historic ties with Indonesia, packaged dried (raw) emping is also available for home frying. These are to be found in Indonesian speciality stores referred to by Indonesian names such as "Toko" or "Warung" (both meaning shop or store).

Emping is frequently served solely as a snack or accompaniment to Indonesian traditional dishes. They are often added as a crispy addition to Indonesian dishes such as soto, nasi uduk, sop buntut, gado-gado, lontong sayur, nasi goreng, nasi kuning, laksa, Mie aceh and bubur ayam.

== See also ==
- Emping padi
- Kripik
- Krupuk
- Rempeyek
