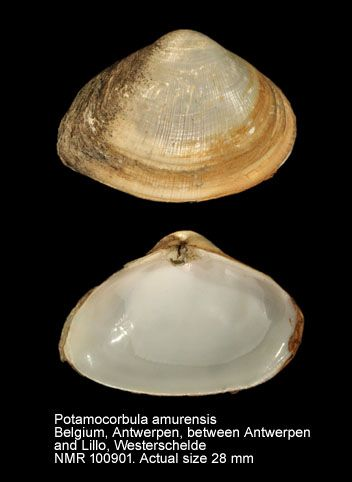

Scientific classification
- Kingdom: Animalia
- Phylum: Mollusca
- Class: Bivalvia
- Order: Myida
- Superfamily: Myoidea
- Family: Corbulidae
- Genus: Potamocorbula
- Species: P. amurensis

Binomial name
- Potamocorbula amurensis (Schrenck, 1861)

Synonyms
- Aloidis amurensis (Schrenck, 1867); Corbula amplexa A. Adams, 1862; Corbula amurensis Schrenck, 1861; Corbula frequens Yokoyama, 1922; Corbula pustulosa Yokoyama, 1922; Corbula sematensis Yokoyama, 1922; Corbula vladivostokensis Bartsch, 1929; Potamocorbula amurensis takatuayamaensis Ando, 1965

= Potamocorbula amurensis =

Species of bivalve

Potamocorbula amurensis is a species of small saltwater clam, a marine bivalve mollusc in the order Myida. Common names include the overbite clam, the Asian clam, the Amur River clam and the brackish-water corbula. The species is native to marine and brackish waters in the northern Pacific Ocean, its range extending from Siberia to China, Korea and Japan. It has become naturalised in San Francisco Bay.

== Description ==
Potamocorbula amurensis grows to a length of about 25 mm (1 in). The umbo is about halfway along the hinge side of the shell and the shape of each valve is like a wide isosceles triangle with rounded corners. The right valve is rather larger than the left so that it overlaps a little at the margin, a fact that distinguishes this species from other similar clams. The surface is smooth with faint concentric sculpture that is parallel to the margin. The general colour is cream, yellowish or light brown. In young individuals, a dark-coloured periostracum covers the outer surface of each valve, but in older specimens this skin is largely worn away except for some wrinkled remnants at the valve margin. The part of the shell buried in the substrate is clean, whereas the exposed portion is often colonised by other organisms which stain it a dark colour.

== Distribution and habitat ==
The native range of Potamocorbula amurensis, "of the Amur River" is Siberia, China, Korea and Japan, between the latitudes of 53° N and 22° N. It has also become established in San Francisco Bay. It lives subtidally and on intertidal mud flats partially buried in soft sediment. It is tolerant of a wide range of salinities, ranging from about one part to thirty-three parts per thousand. In San Francisco Bay it is found subtidally in winter at 8 °C (46 °F) and in summer occurs on exposed mud flats at 23 °C (73 °F). It is believed that it was transported across the Pacific in ballast water and discharged accidentally into the Bay around 1986.

== Biology ==
Potamocorbula amurensis lies semi-submerged in sediment, fixing itself in place by means of a few byssal threads. It has two short siphons, through one of which (the upper, inhalant siphon) water is drawn into the shell. This water is passed over the gills, where oxygen and food particles such as bacteria, phytoplankton and zooplankton are removed. The water then passes out of the shell through the lower, exhalent siphon. This clam becomes sexually mature at the age of a few months. A single female can produce between 45,000 and 220,000 eggs. These are fertilised externally and spend about 18 days as planktonic veliger larvae which can disperse to other areas, before settling on the seabed.

== Invasive species ==
There are concerns about Potamocorbula amurensis as an invasive species in San Francisco Bay, where it became established in the 1980s. It has thrived there and in some places it is present at densities of more than 10,000 individuals per square metre (10.8 square feet). It out-competes native species and disrupts food chains by filtering phytoplankton and zooplankton from the water and consequently depriving juvenile fish of their planktonic food. Another invasive species, the European green crab, Carcinus maenas, which arrived in the San Francisco Bay in around 1990, may control P. amurensis. The green crab voraciously eats bivalves, including P. amurensis, but may have other, unexpected, consequences.
