= Lontong =

Indonesian traditional rice cake

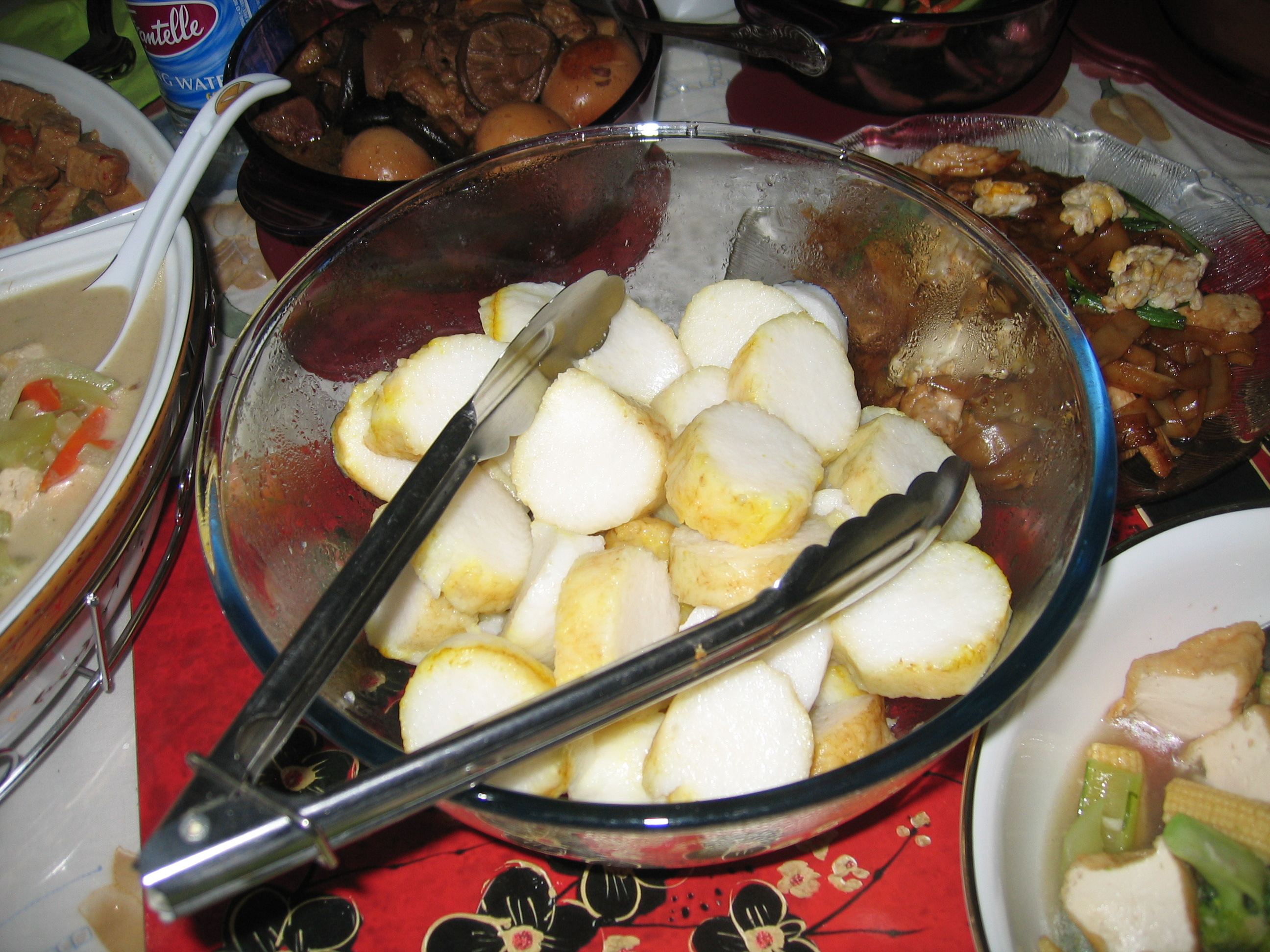
- A traditional way of serving lontong
- Course: Main course
- Place of origin: Indonesia
- Region or state: Java
- Associated cuisine: Indonesia, Malaysia and Singapore
- Serving temperature: Room temperature
- Main ingredients: Compressed rice cooked in banana leaf
- Variations: Various
- Similar dishes: Burasa, ketupat, lemang, lepet

Lontong (Indonesian pronunciation: [ˈlɔn̪t̪ɔŋ]) is an Indonesian dish made of compressed rice cake in the form of a cylinder wrapped inside a banana leaf, commonly found in Indonesia, Malaysia, and Singapore. Rice is rolled inside a banana leaf and boiled, then cut into small cakes as a staple food replacement for steamed rice. The texture is similar to that of ketupat, with the difference being that the ketupat container is made from woven janur (young coconut leaf) fronds, while lontong uses banana leaves instead.

It is commonly called nasi himpit (lit. "pressed rice") in Malaysia, despite being created using other methods.

Arem-arem also known as lontong isi is a smaller version of lontong and "halal" distant relative of bakcang, filled with vegetables and occasionally meat, eaten as a snack.

The dish is usually served hot or at room temperature with peanut sauce-based dishes such as gado-gado, karedok, ketoprak, other traditional salads, and satay. It can be eaten as an accompaniment to coconut milk-based soups, such as lontong sayur, soto, gulai, and curries. It is also used as an alternative to vermicelli noodles.

Note that in Malaysia and Singapore, the word lontong is used somewhat differently (to a curry-soup dish with these rice-cakes inside, see below).

== History ==
The origin of lontong is from ketupat. Both are made from the main ingredient of steamed rice in a banana leaf wrapper or young coconut leaf. Initially, lontong was only considered ordinary food. However, after the spread of Islam to Java, the tradition of eating lontong and ketupat began. Sunan Kalijaga was the first to introduce lontong to Javanese people, including ketupat. This is part of the da'wah carried out by Sunan Kalijaga at that time. Lontong is often served with Gulai sauce and vegetables, chayote, tempeh, tofu, tauco, boiled egg, sambal, and krupuk crackers.

== Preparation ==
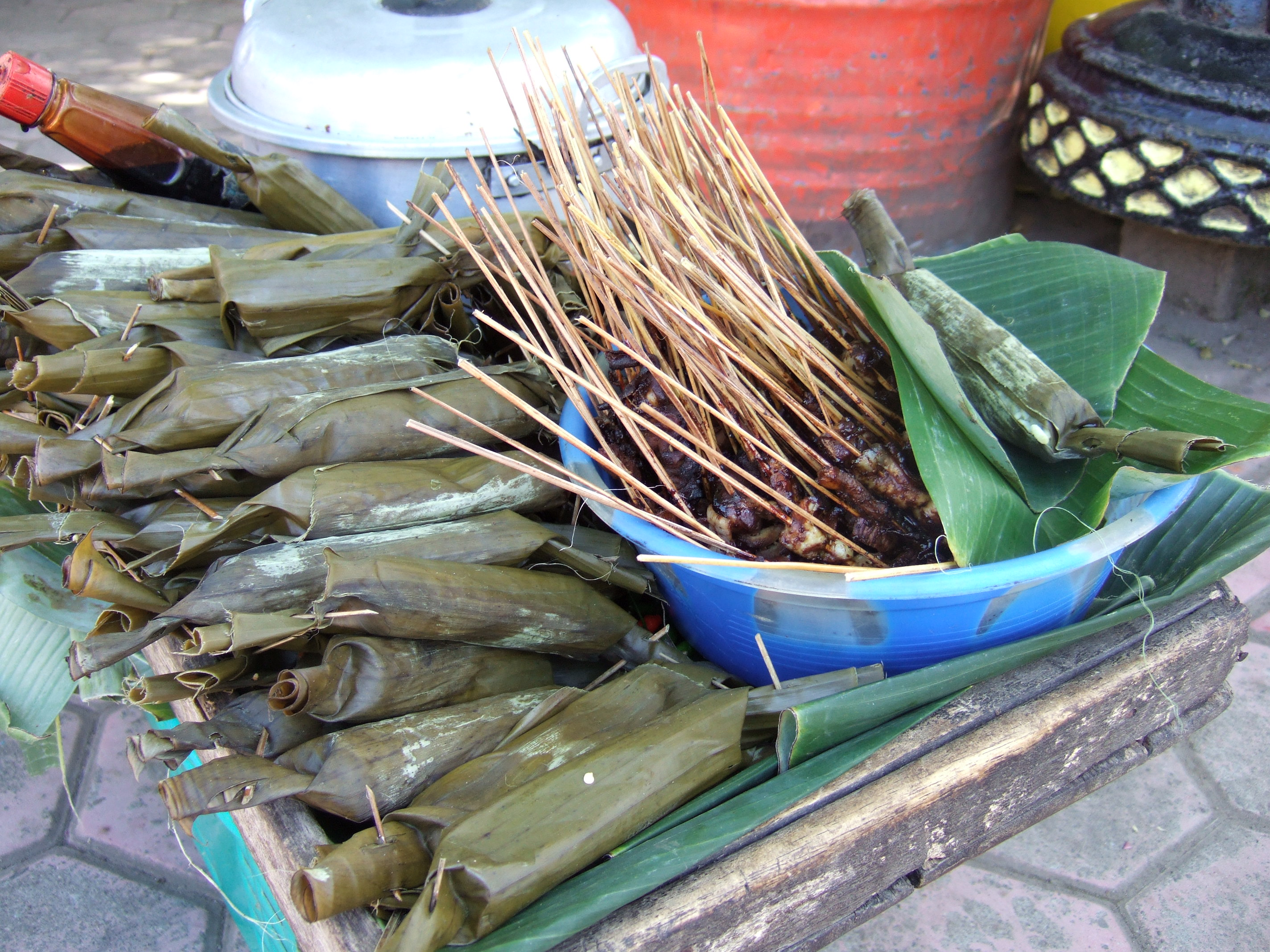
Wrapped lontongs with satay selling in Java, Indonesia

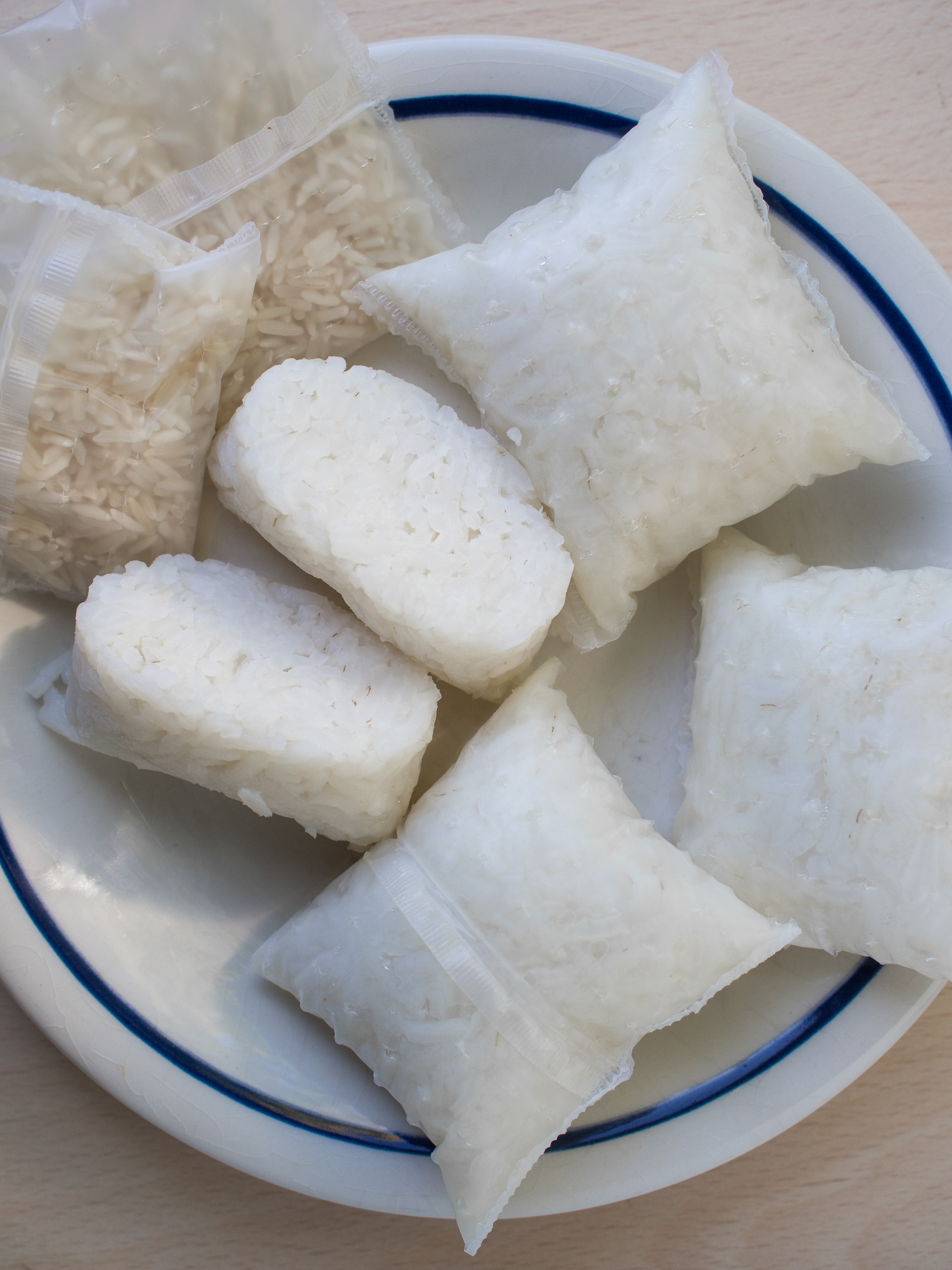
Uncooked and cooked lontong made in perforated plastic pouches

Lontong is traditionally made by boiling the rice until it is partially cooked and then packing it tightly into a rolled-up banana leaf. The leaf is secured with lidi semat, a wooden needle made from the central rib of a coconut leaf, and cooked in boiling water for about 90 minutes. Once the compacted rice has cooled, it can be cut up into bite-sized pieces. Outer parts of lontong usually have a greenish color because of the chlorophyll left by the banana leaf rubbing off on the rice cake surface.

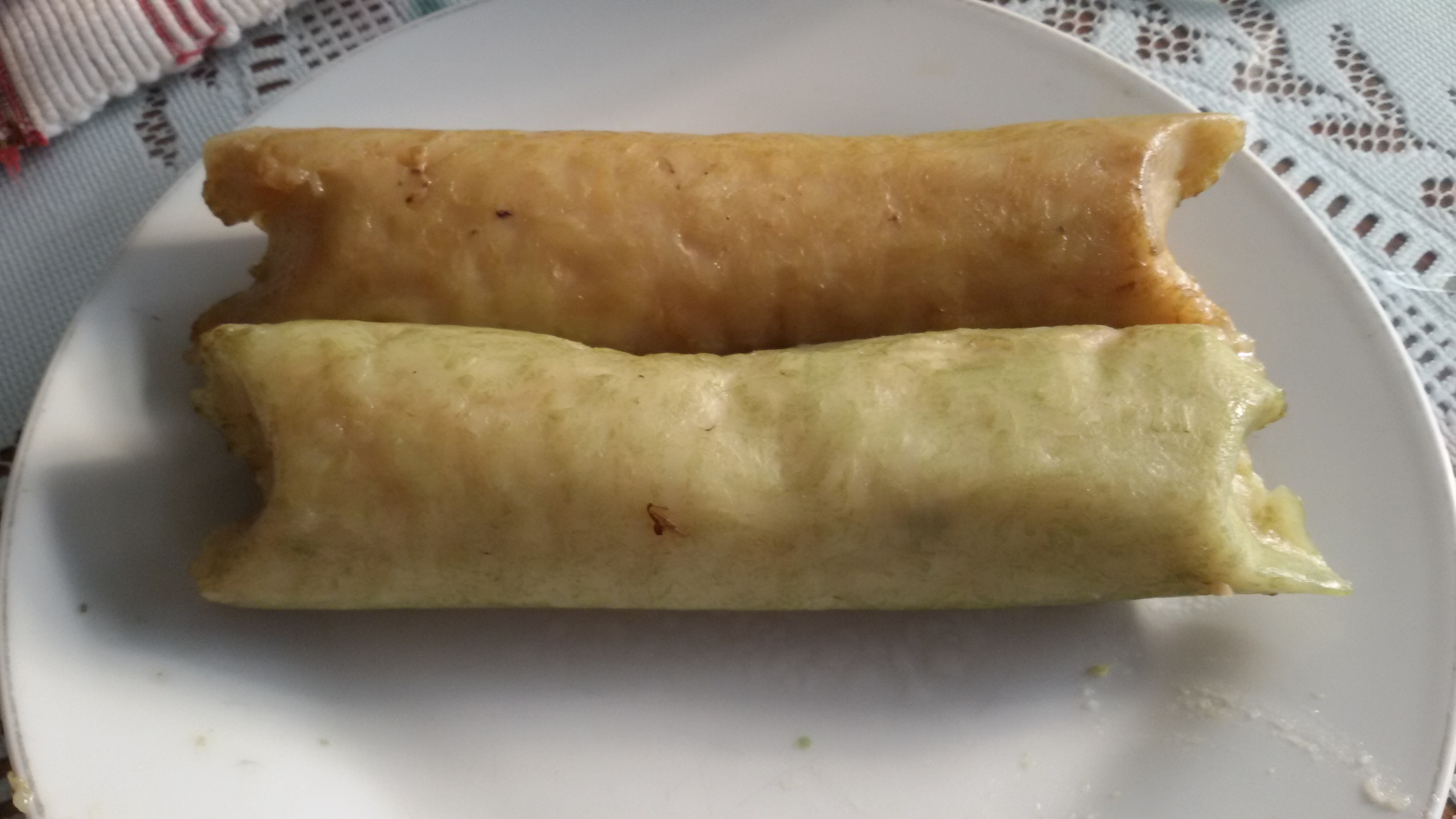
Unwrapped lontong. Different colors depend on the banana leaf which is used as the wrapper is a typically Indonesian lontong.

Alternative ways of cooking lontong include placing uncooked rice into a muslin bag and then letting the water seep in and cause the rice to form a solid mass. Another popular and easier method is by using commercially available plastic pouches; rice-filled and punctured with a needle to create small holes to allow the water to seep into the package, which are then boiled until the rice becomes cooked and has filled up the pouch. This method was meant to imitate the banana leaf's liquid permeability. Nevertheless, the use of organic banana leaves is highly recommended for better health and ecological reasons.

On the other hand, Malaysian nasi himpit (lit. 'pressed rice') is traditionally created differently. The method is more a mechanical pressure than applying permeable boiling technique; freshly cooked rice is compressed for a few hours between two heavy stone slabs or two trays with a heavy weight on top to produce nasi himpit. However, nasi himpit is now usually speedily produced in water-permeable plastic sachets filled with rice and boiled in water.

== Dishes ==
Similar to rice, the taste of lontong is bland and neutral, and it depends on other ingredients to give a taste through spices and sauces. Commonly, lontong serves as a compact alternative to steamed rice. It can be served with almost any traditional dish recipe as a staple food, but is often eaten with peanut sauce or coconut milk-based soup.

=== Indonesia ===
==== Lontong sayur ====
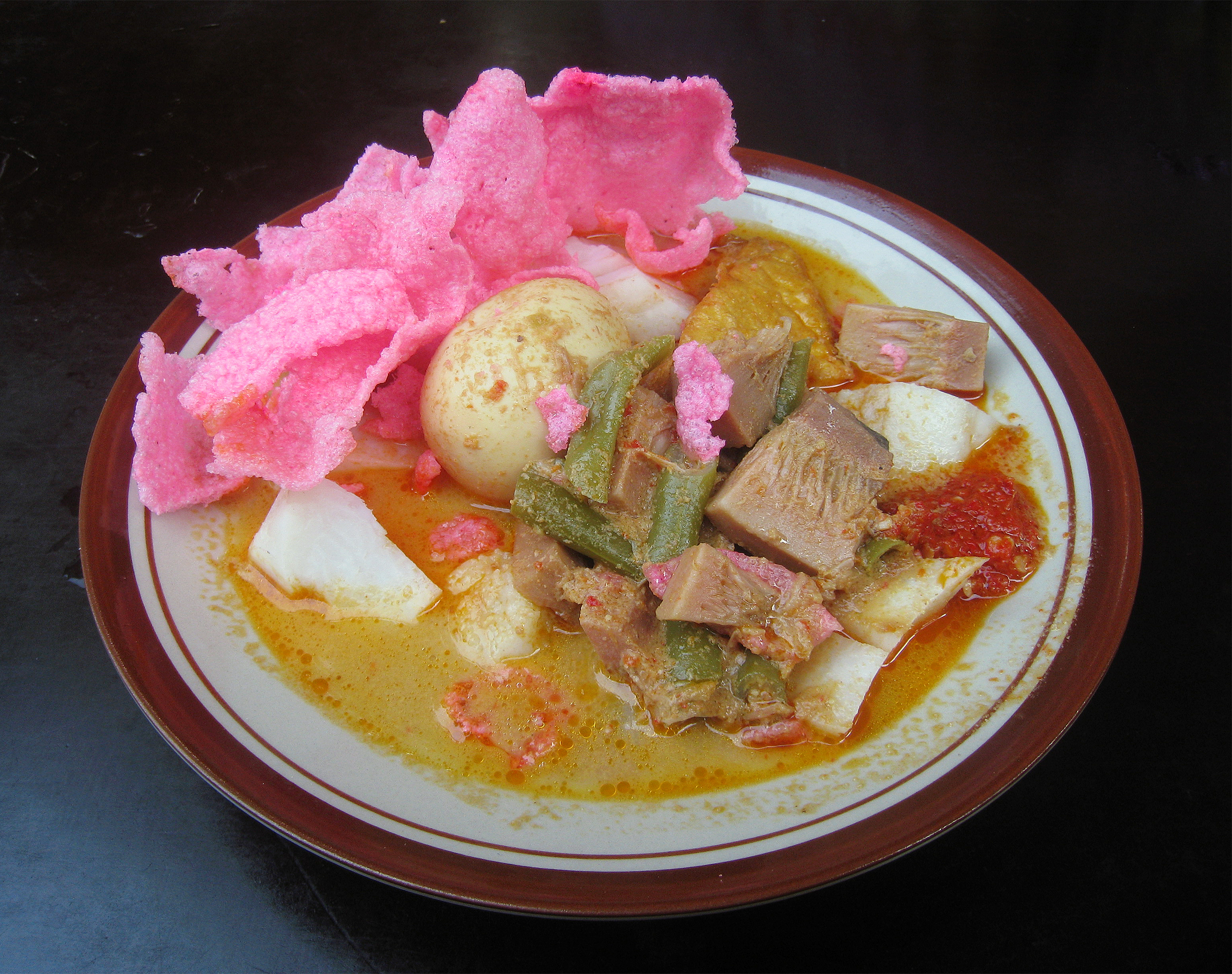
Lontong sayur, lontong rice cake served with vegetables, tofu, and boiled egg in coconut milk soup, with krupuk and sambal, popular in Jakarta

In Indonesia, especially among Betawi people, lontong usually served as lontong sayur, pieces of lontong served in coconut milk soup with shredded chayote, tempeh, tofu, hard-boiled egg, sambal, and kerupuk. Lontong sayur is related and quite similar to Ketupat sayur and is a favourite breakfast menu next to bubur ayam and nasi uduk.

==== Lontong balap ====
In Surabaya, lontong balap is made from lontong, taoge (bean sprouts), fried tofu, lentho (fried mashed beans), fried shallots, sambal petis and sweet soy sauce. East Javanese lontong and tofu recipes are known for their distinctive flavour, acquired from a generous amount of petis (a type of shrimp paste).

==== Lontong cap go meh ====
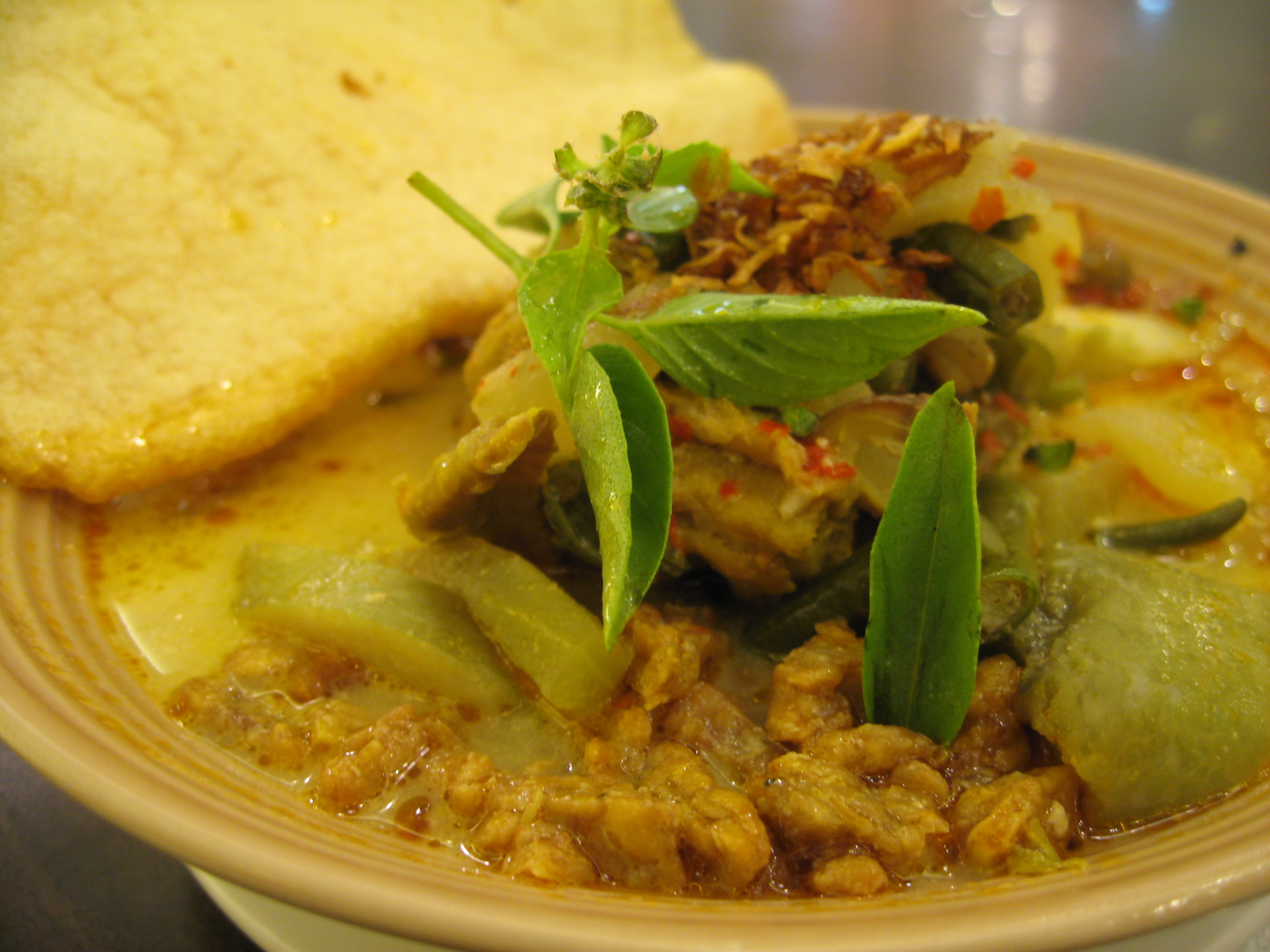
Lontong cap go meh, a Chinese-style (Peranakan) of lontong, can be found around Jakarta.

The more elaborate recipe of lontong is lontong cap go meh, a Peranakan Chinese Indonesian adaptation of traditional Indonesian dishes, lontong served with rich opor ayam, sayur lodeh, sambal goreng ati (beef liver in sambal), acar, telur pindang (hard boiled tea egg), abon (beef floss), and koya powder (mixture of soy and dried shrimp powder). Lontong cap go meh is usually consumed by the Chinese Indonesian community during the Cap go meh celebration.

==== Lontong dekem ====
Lontong dekem is originated from Pemalang Regency, Central Java. The process involves soaking the lontong in soup until it is submerged, hence the name dekem meaning "immersion" in Pemalang Javanese dialect.

==== Lontong kari ====
Lontong kari is lontong served in soupy chicken curry and vegetables. It is become a specialty breakfast of Parahyangan region. Kari was first brought to Indonesia by Buddhist monks from India.

==== Lontong bengkalis ====
Lontong bengkalis from Bengkalis Regency, Riau, consists of lontong, jackfruit soup, and peanut sauce. It is also sprinkled with anchovies and slices of green bird's eye chili.

==== Lontong gulai pakis ====
In West Sumatra, a Minang dish from Padang Pariaman is called lontong gulai pakis, lontong served with young fern leaves gulai. Usually served with hard-boiled eggs and kerupuk jangek or krupuk kulit (cow skin crackers).

==== Lontong kikil ====
Lontong kikil is lontong serve in spicy cow's trotters soup and vegetables.

==== Lontong kupang ====
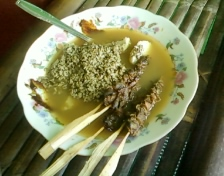
Lontong kupang, a specialty dish of Sidoarjo

Another lontong recipes are lontong kupang and lontong balap from Surabaya and Sidoarjo area in East Java. Lontong kupang is made of lontong served with small white clams.

==== Lontong krubyuk ====
Lontong krubyuk is a traditional Karimunjawa dish. The term lontong krubyuk itself comes from the Javanese language krubyuk or ngrubyuk means walking in water or puddles. This name corresponds to the appearance of a dish that contains a lot of gravy. A serving of lontong krubyuk comes with lontong, half-cooked bean sprouts, sliced celery leaves, and shredded chicken stew, and then is poured with broth.

==== Lontong mie ====
Lontong mie is one of the popular dishes in Surabaya. It consists of slices of lontong, yellow noodles, fried tofu, petis (shrimp paste sauce), bean sprouts, lento (black-eyed pea fritter), and fried shallots.

==== Lontong pical ====
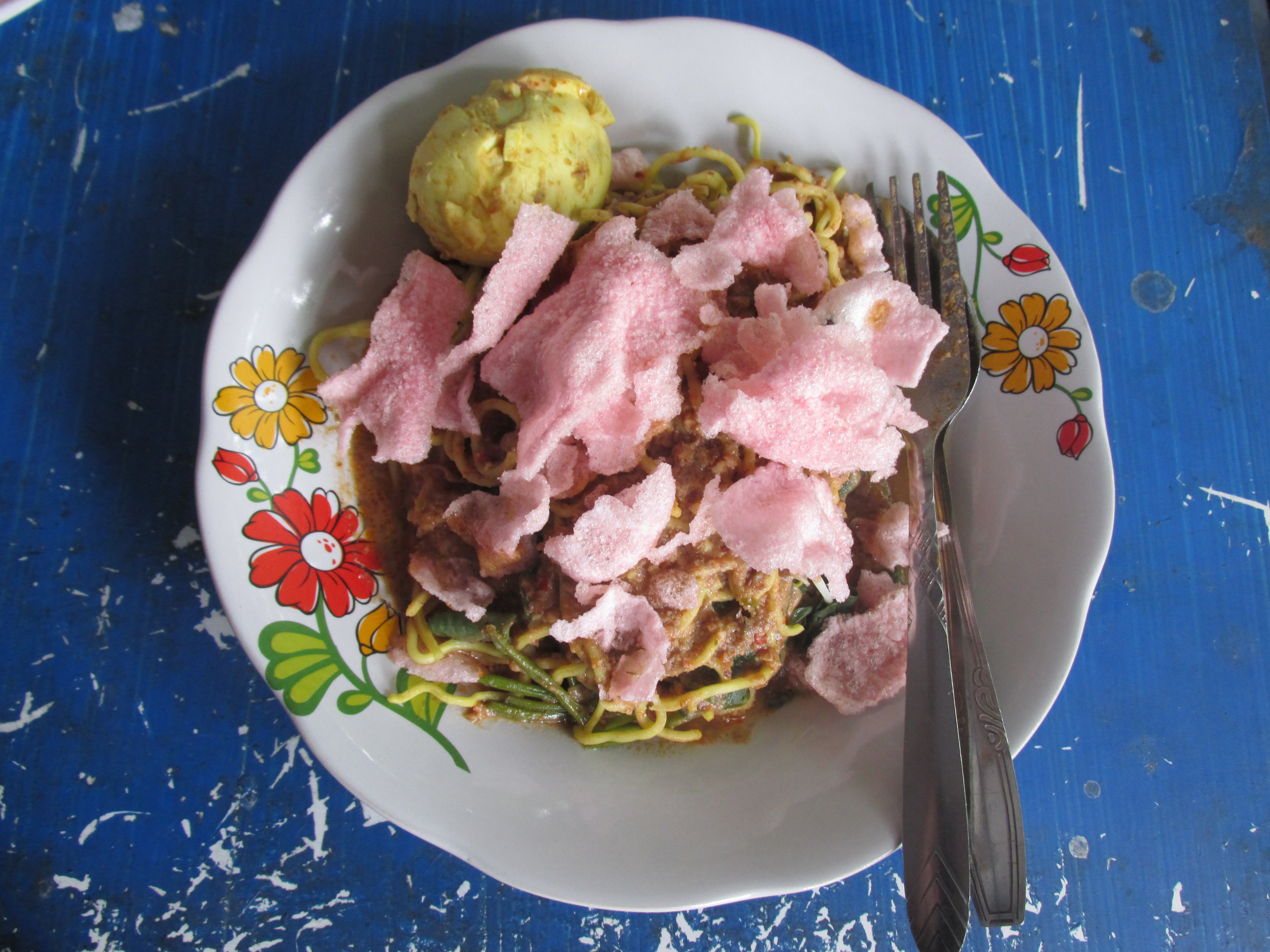
Lontong pical

Lontong pical is a Minang food. It is rice cake with noodles and vegetables smothered in thin peanut sauce also sprinkled with krupuk.

==== Lontong tahu ====
A lontong dish from Blora, Central Java. It is made of slices of lontong, fried tofu, and peanut sauce and served on a teak leaf plate.

==== Lontong tuyuhan ====
Lontong tuyuhan is slices of rice cake with chicken and coconut milk soup. It is a delicacy of Rembang Regency.

==== Arem-arem ====
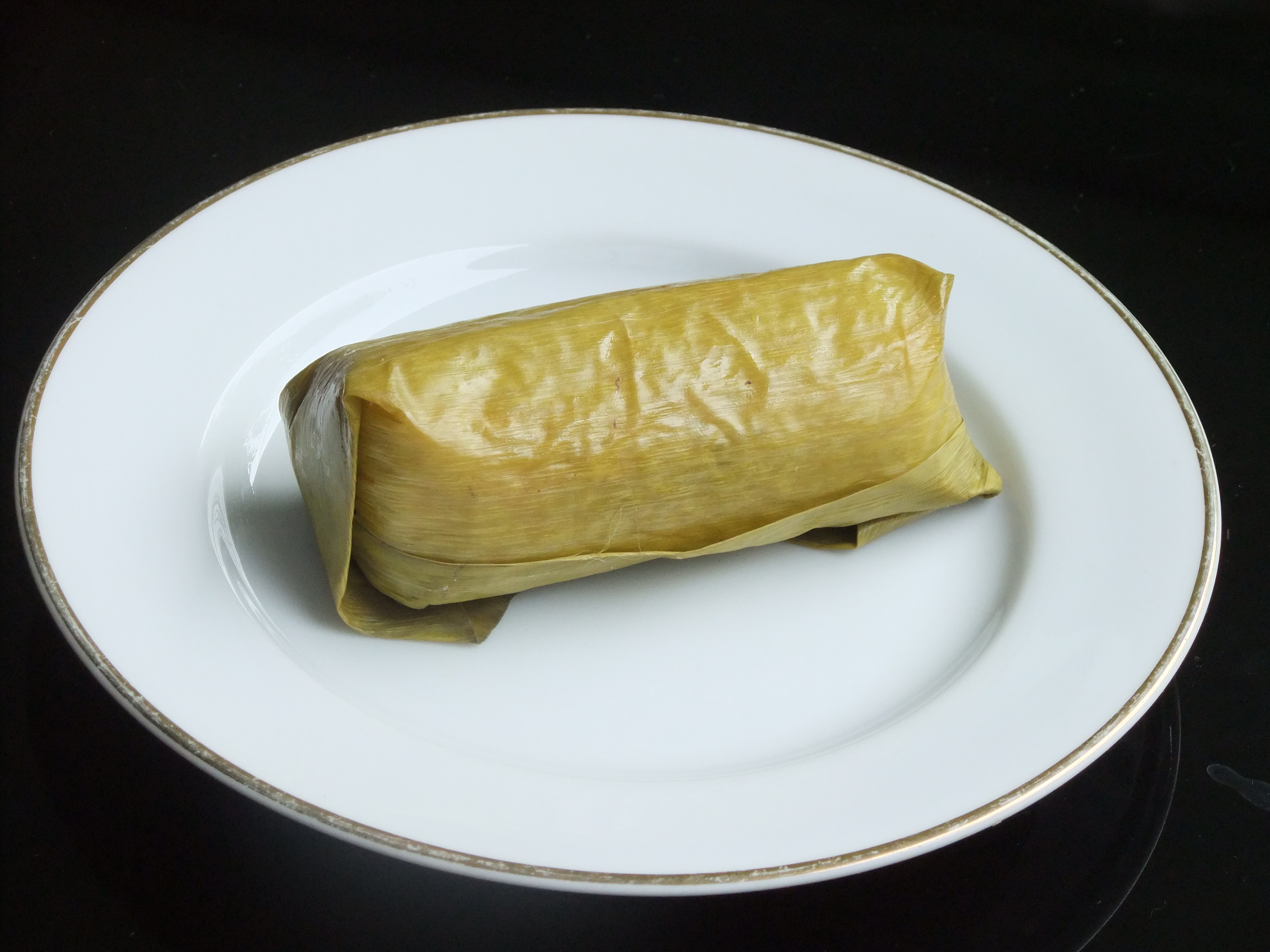
Arem-arem, filled lontong snack

Arem-arem is the smaller size lontong filled with diced vegetables such as carrot, common bean, and potato seasoned with salt and red chili, or tofu, oncom, and tempeh; sometimes also filled with minced meat or abon (beef floss), are eaten as a snack. The rice is flavored with coconut milk. This kind of snack is called arem-arem in Javanese, but commonly called simply lontong or lontong isi in other parts of Indonesia. It is a common snack in Java, and quite similar to lemper, but uses common rice instead of sticky rice lemper. It usually uses a thin, young banana leaf as a wrapper, a thin, light yellow-green colored banana leaf. Lontong on the other hand, usually uses thicker, mature banana leaves. The texture of arem-arem snacks is softer compared to those of common lontong, due to the thinner banana leaf, addition of coconut milk, and prolonged boiling and steaming period.

=== Malaysia and Singapore ===
It is commonly called nasi himpit (lit. "pressed rice") in Malaysia, and unlike lontong, nasi himpit is created by pressing rice overnight. The lontong rice cake is cut into smaller pieces, and these rice cake pieces are known as nasi himpit (compressed rice). The term lontong in Malaysia and Singapore usually refers to a dish that consists of rice cakes in a coconut-based soup such as sayur lodeh containing shrimp and vegetables like chopped cabbage, turnip, and carrots. Additional condiments are added either during cooking or in individual servings. These include things such as fried tempeh, fried tofu, boiled eggs, dried cuttlefish sambal, fried spicy shredded coconut (serunding kelapa), fried chicken, etc.

Nasi himpit is also an accompaniment to satay and is eaten with peanut sauce. In the east coast states of Peninsular Malaysia, nasi himpit is eaten with peanut sauce (kuah kacang) for breakfast. Nasi himpit is also one of the ingredients in the Malaysian version of chicken soto.

== See also ==
- Burasa
- Ketupat, a similar dish with container made from weaved janur (young palm leaves)
- Lemper
- Lepet
