= Lontong cap go meh =

Indonesian rice dish

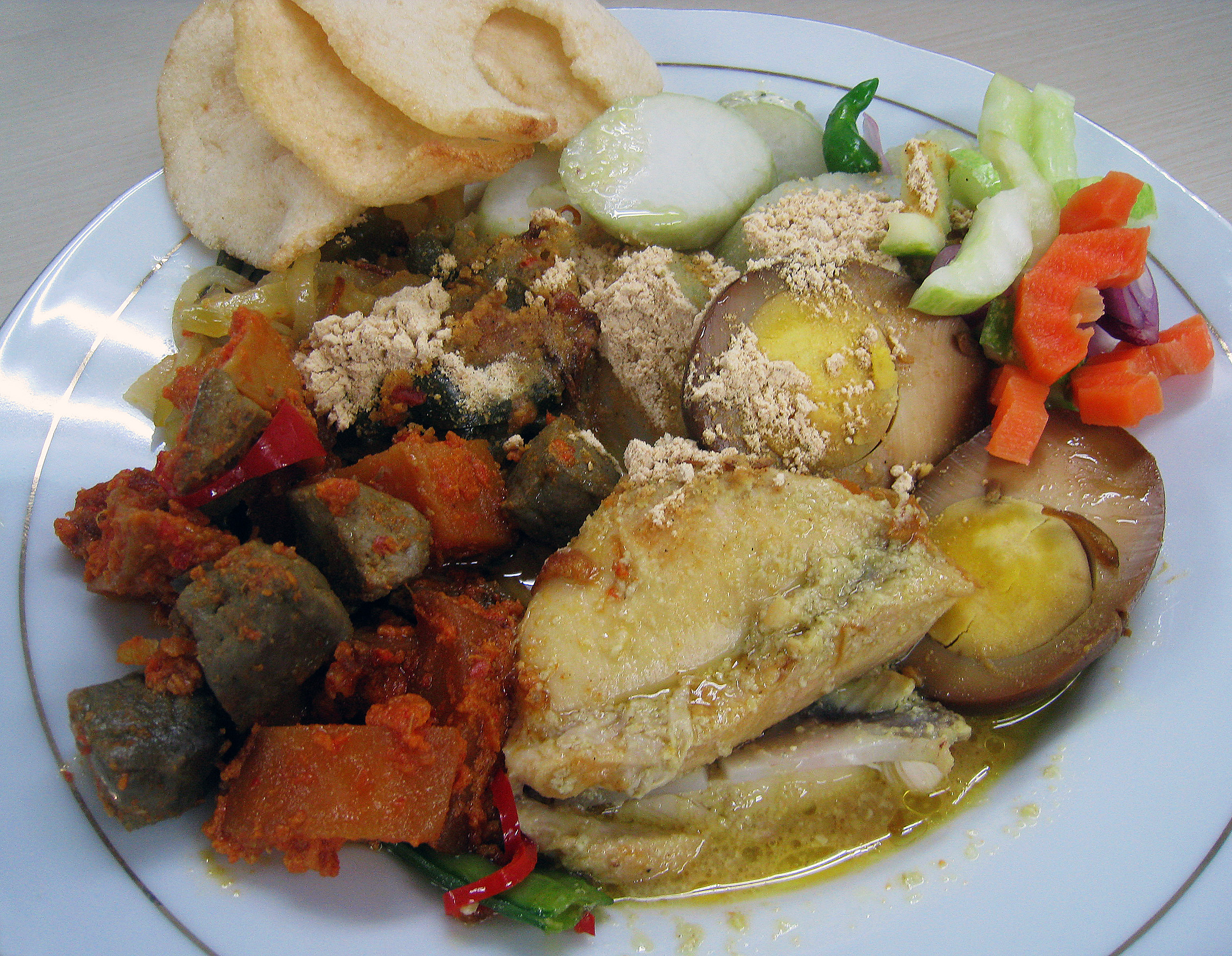
- A plate of lontong cap go meh
- Course: Main course
- Place of origin: Indonesia
- Region or state: Java, Nationwide
- Serving temperature: Hot
- Main ingredients: Lontong topped with opor ayam, sayur lodeh, sambal goreng ati, pindang telur, koya powder, sambal, and krupuk

Lontong cap go meh (Javanese: ꦭꦺꦴꦤ꧀ꦛꦺꦴꦁꦕꦥ꧀ꦒꦺꦴꦩꦺꦃ, romanized: lonthong cap go mèh) is a Chinese Indonesian take on traditional Indonesian dishes, more precisely Javanese cuisine. It is lontong (an elongated rice cake) served with richly-flavoured dishes which include opor ayam chicken in coconut milk, sayur lodeh vegetable soup, hot and spicy liver, hard-boiled pindang egg, koya powder made of soy and dried shrimp or beef floss, pickles, chili paste and prawn cracker. Lontong cap go meh is usually consumed by the Chinese Indonesian community during the Cap go meh celebration.

== Components ==
Lontong cap go meh is actually not a single dish but more of a meal set with several side dishes, served in similar fashion to nasi campur or nasi Bali. It is a combination of several Javanese favourite dishes—each often prepared and cooked separately—and combined in a single plate prior to serving. The rich combination of flavourful dishes demonstrates the festive nature of the dish, which is traditionally consumed during Cap go meh in Java. The components of lontong cap go meh are:

1. Lontong: elongated rice cake cooked in banana leaf
2. Opor ayam: chicken stew in coconut milk and spices
3. Sayur lodeh: vegetables in coconut milk soup, sometimes replaced by sayur labu siam (Chayote in coconut milk soup)
4. Sambal goreng ati: beef liver fried in sambal chili paste
5. Telur pindang: hard-boiled marble egg
6. Koya powder: a mixture of ground fried soybeans and dried shrimp powder, sometimes replaced or added with abon (beef floss)
7. Acar: pickles, usually consists of cucumber, carrot, shallot and birds-eye chili
8. Sambal: spiced chili paste with terasi shrimp paste
9. Kerupuk: prawn cracker, sometimes replaced by emping cracker

== Origin ==
Chinese cuisine's influences on Indonesian cuisine are evident in Indonesian take on Chinese dishes, such as mie goreng, lumpia, bakso and siomay. However, the culinary influences also took another way around. Peranakan Chinese Indonesian cuisine has also been influenced by native Indonesian cuisine. It is believed that lontong cap go meh is a Peranakan Chinese Indonesian take on traditional Indonesian dishes.

Early Chinese immigrants in Indonesia settled in northern coastal cities of Java, such as Semarang, Pekalongan, Lasem, Tuban and Surabaya, as early as Majapahit period. During that time only male Chinese settled in Java and they intermarried with local Javanese women and created a Javanese-Chinese Peranakan culture. These early Chinese immigrants became accustomed to the cooking of their Javanese wives. To celebrate Chinese New Year, during Cap go meh, Peranakan of Java replaced the traditional yuanxiao (rice ball) with local lontong accompanied with an array of Javanese dishes such as opor ayam and sambal goreng ati (spicy beef liver). It is believed that the dish reflect the assimilation among Chinese immigrants and local Javanese community. It is believed that lontong cap go meh is full of good fortune symbols; the thick rice cake is considered richer compared to thin watery bubur (rice congee) which is often regarded as food of the poor. The elongated form of lontong also symbolizes longevity. While eggs symbolize good fortune and yellowish turmeric-coconut milk broth represents gold and fortune. When eating the dish during Chinese New Year, it is the tradition in Medan to jump after taking each mouthful, saying "Boing, tjampolin, boing".

Lontong cap go meh was strictly a Peranakan-Javanese phenomena; Peranakans in the Malay Peninsula, Sumatra and Borneo are not familiar with this dish. It is commonly associated with Imlek traditions of Chinese Indonesians in Javan cities, especially Semarang. Since Betawi people (native Jakartans) were also heavily influenced by Chinese Indonesian Peranakan culture, lontong cap go meh is also considered as part of Betawi cuisine. The famous chinese new year song also feature this indonesian dish in its lyrics "七个Lontong呛咚呛", literally meaning "seven lontong makes the sound of prosperity"

== See also ==
- Ketupat sayur
- Peranakan cuisine
- Tumpeng
