= Lontong dekem =

Indonesian rice dish

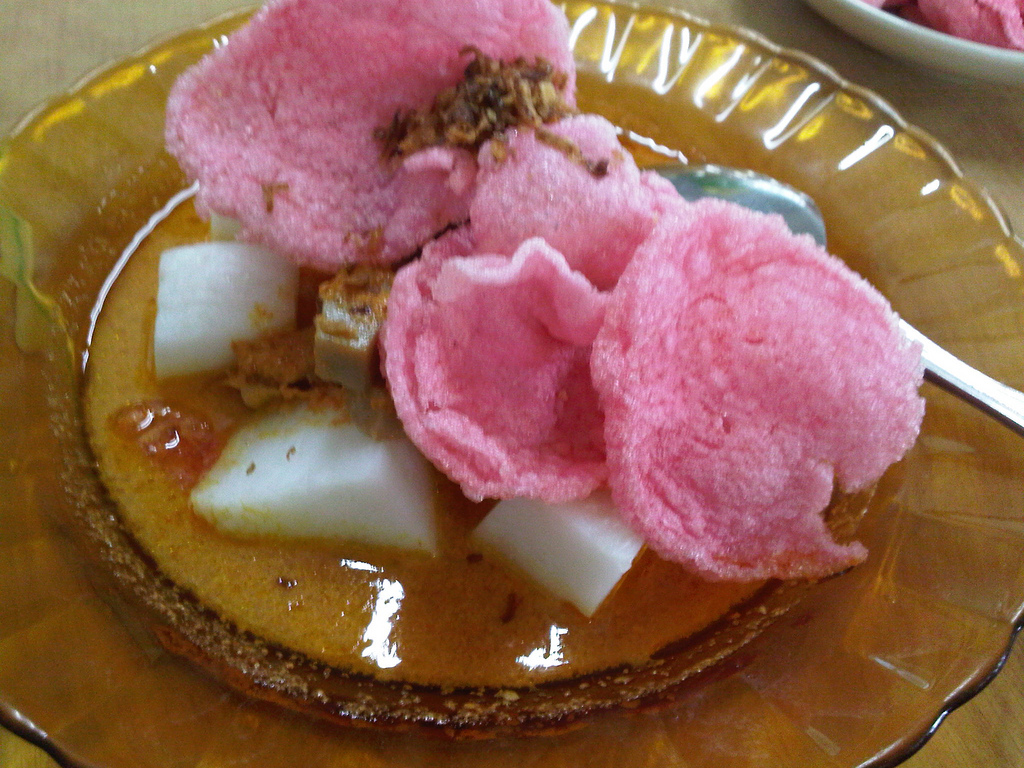
Lontong dekem

Lontong dekem, also known as dekem rice cake, is a dish consisting of sliced rice cakes served in a yellow, watery broth. It originated in Pemalang Regency, Central Java. The name dekem comes from the Javanese word meaning "immersion," referring to the method of soaking the rice cakes in water during preparation. It is typically garnished with fried shallots, serundeng (spiced grated coconut), and crackers (krupuk). The broth's yellow color comes from the use of turmeric and other spices.

Lontong dekem is commonly served with chicken satay, which comes in two variations: fried satay and satay stewed in a savory sauce. In some variations, duck meat is also included as a topping.

Lontong dekem is a regional specialty of Pemalang and is eaten at breakfast, during special occasions, and most typically in the evening, with vendors operating from late afternoon until night. It is commonly found around the Pemalang city center, especially near the Alun-alun (town square).

== See also ==
- Lontong
- Indonesian cuisine
- Pemalang Regency
