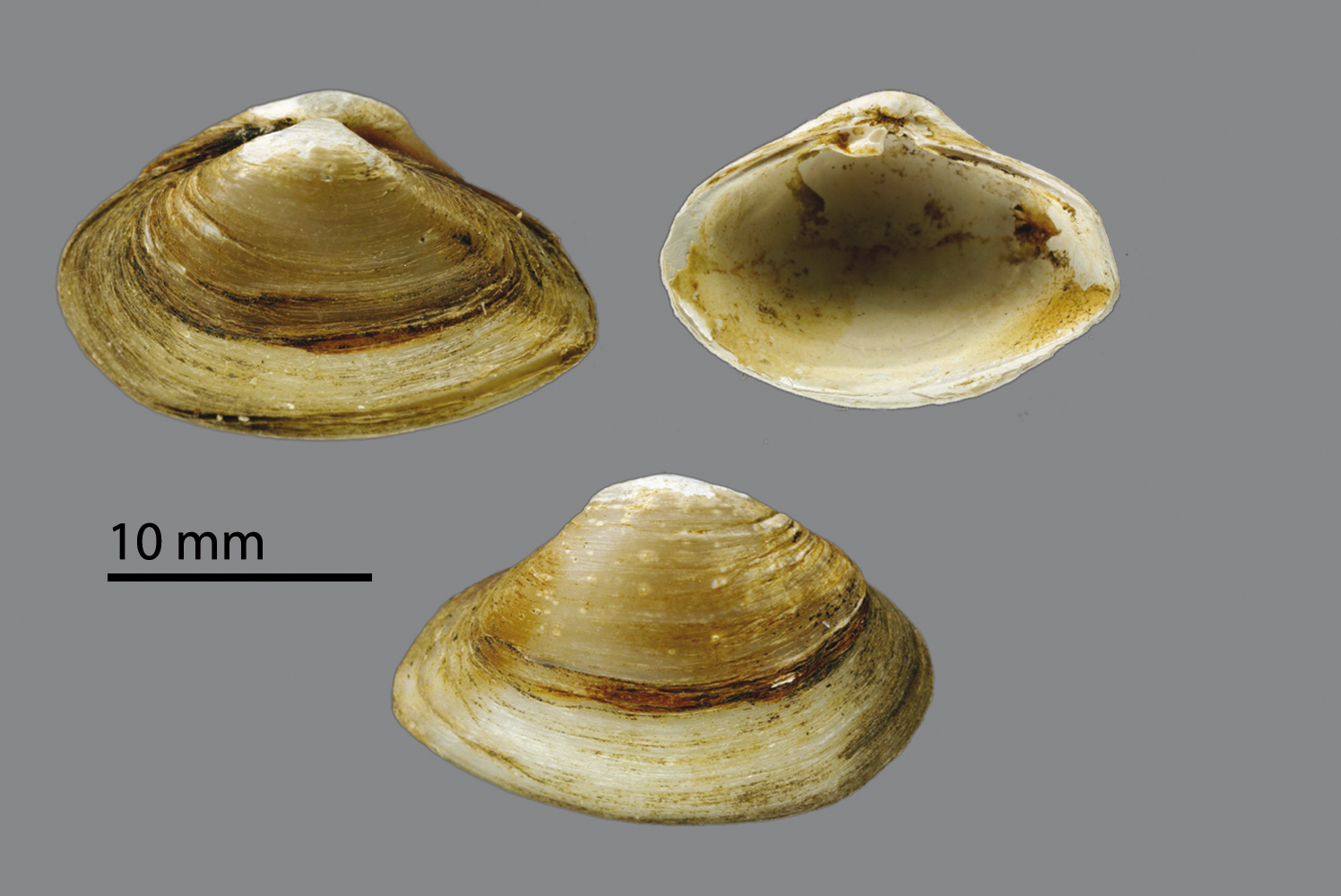
- Potamocorbula laevis

Scientific classification
- Domain: Eukaryota
- Kingdom: Animalia
- Phylum: Mollusca
- Class: Bivalvia
- Order: Myida
- Superfamily: Myoidea
- Family: Corbulidae
- Genus: Potamocorbula; Habe, 1955

Species
- See text.

= Potamocorbula =

Genus of bivalves

Potamocorbula is a genus of very small saltwater clams, marine bivalve molluscs in the subfamily Erodoninae of the family Corbulidae in the order Myida.

== Species ==
The World Register of Marine Species lists the following species:

- Potamocorbula adamsi (Tryon, 1869)
- Potamocorbula adusta (Reeve, 1844)
- Potamocorbula amurensis (Schrenck, 1861)
- Potamocorbula fasciata (Reeve, 1843)
- Potamocorbula laevis (Hinds, 1843)
- Potamocorbula nimbosa (Hanley, 1843)
- Potamocorbula rubromuscula Zhuang & Cai, 1983

Synonyms

- Potamocorbula abbreviata (Preston, 1907): synonym of Indosphenia abbreviata (Preston, 1907)
- Potamocorbula chilkaensis (Preston, 1911): synonym of Indosphenia abbreviata chilkaensis (Preston, 1911)
