= Telur pindang =

Indonesian hard-boiled eggs

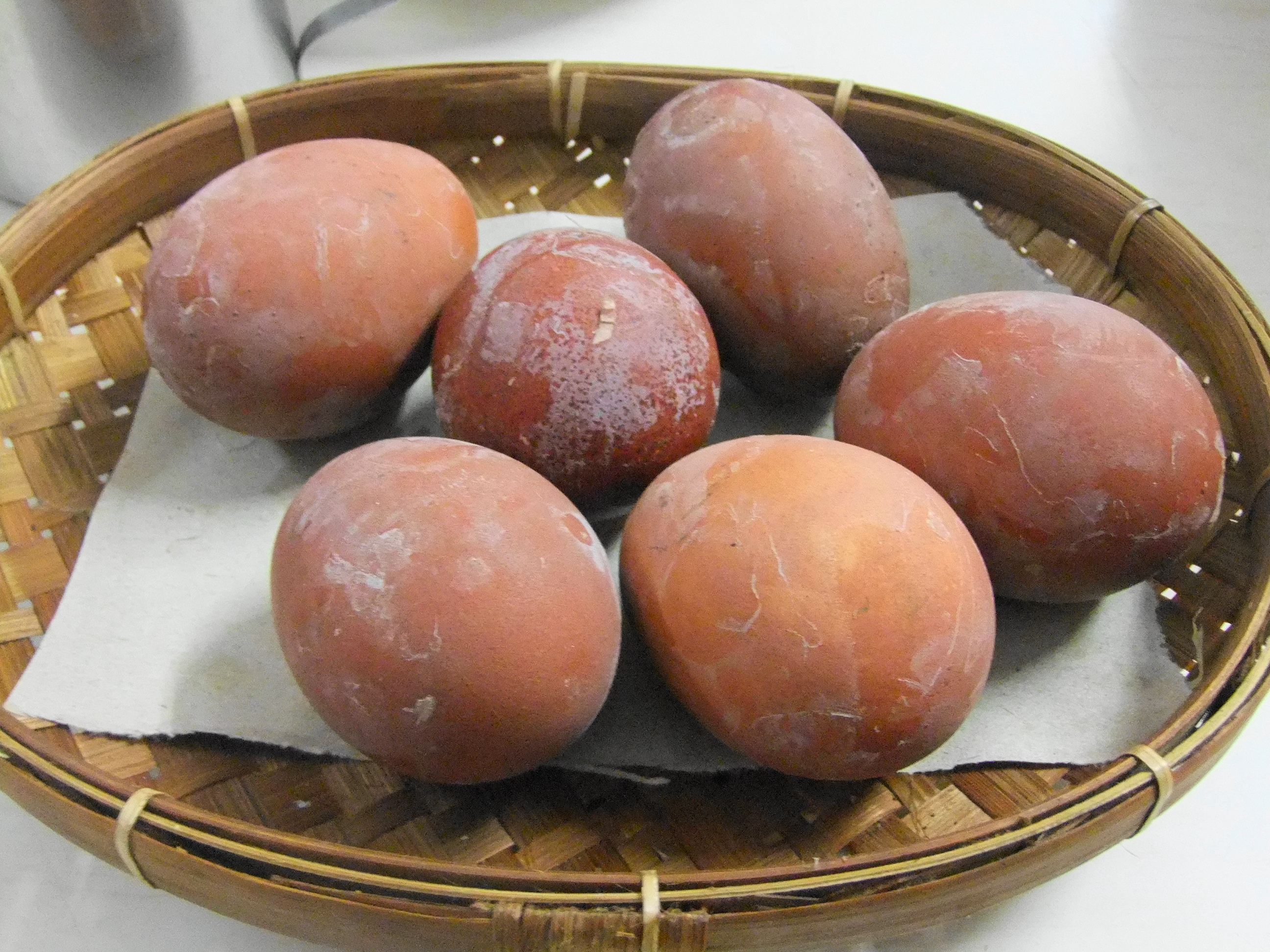
- Unpeeled telur pindang, hard-boiled eggs in spices
- Place of origin: Indonesia
- Region or state: Java and Sumatra
- Associated cuisine: Indonesia, Malaysia and Singapore
- Main ingredients: Eggs boiled in salt, soy sauce, shallot skins, and teak leaves

Telur pindang or pindang eggs are hard-boiled eggs cooked in the pindang process, originating from the Javanese cuisine of Indonesia, and common in Malaysia in Malay cuisine and Palembang cuisine. The eggs are boiled slowly in water mixed with salt, soy sauce, shallot skins, teak leaves, and spices. Due to its origins, it bears similarities with Chinese tea eggs. However, instead of black tea, this version uses leftover shallot skins, teak leaves or guava leaves as dark brownish coloring agents.

== Terminology ==
The term pindang refers to the cooking process of boiling the ingredients in salt together with certain spices that contain tannin, usually soy sauce, shallot skin, guava leaves, teak leaves, tea, or other spices common in Southeast Asia. This gives the food a dark brown color and lasts longer compared to plainly boiled eggs, thus pindang is an Indonesian traditional method to preserve food, usually employed for fish and eggs. The technique is native to Java and Sumatra. Other preserving methods include asin or cured and dried in salt, and dendeng which is cured and dried in sugar, acar (pickling), and also asap (smoked).

== Variations ==
=== Indonesia ===
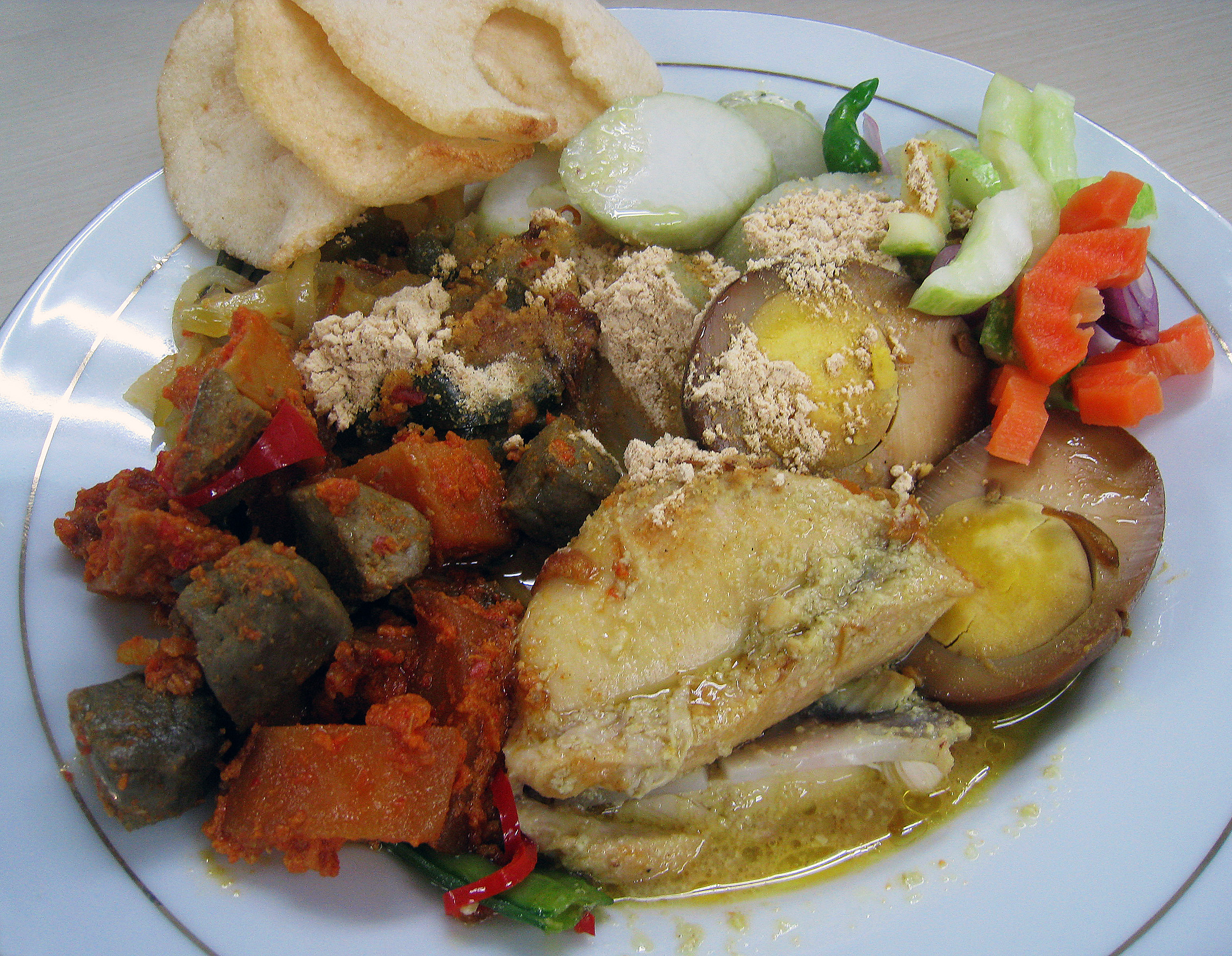
Telur pindang in lontong cap go meh

Today, the telur pindang is widely spread throughout the Indonesian archipelago; however, it is found more prevalent in Javanese cuisine of Central and East Java, and also South Sumatra. Despite sharing similarities with Chinese tea eggs that employs tea leaves, this Indonesian version favours the use of teak leaves, guava leaves or spared shallots skin instead. The use of teak leaf as coloring agent might suggest its Javanese origin, since Java is famous for its teak wood for centuries. The teak leaf is also used to give reddish color in Yogyakarta's gudeg, or even as dyeing material in traditional Javanese batik-making. Indonesian cuisine favour the use of shallots than common onion, and subsequently the peeled shallot skins are usually collected and spared as key ingredient to make pindang eggs later.

The telur pindang is often served as part of tumpeng, nasi kuning or nasi campur. In Yogyakarta, telur pindang often served with gudeg or just steamed rice. It is also part of Chinese Indonesian lontong cap go meh. Those dishes, the tumpeng, nasi kuning, and lontong cap go meh, are important ceremonial dishes for each respective cultures, since eggs are traditionally symbolize fertility, regeneration and luck.

=== Malaysia ===
Telur pindang prepared for a wedding

Telur pindang in Malaysia is most popular in Johor, the southernmost state in Peninsular Malaysia. The true origins of the dish are unclear; however, the cuisine most likely originated from Chinese merchants and settlers who came to the country in the 19th century through the once independent sultanate, having significant similarities to tea eggs.

Another possible theory suggests that it was probably brought by Javanese immigrants instead, that settled in Johor about a century ago. The recipe might have caught on due to its preserved nature. With Johor being a hub of international trade, it would be useful to the many merchants at sea who can benefit from such an easily stored food item that lasted for weeks.

The common ingredients of telur pindang are shallot skins, tamarind, fennel, coriander, soy sauce, and various leaves such as guava leaves or mangosteen leaves, although different recipes have different mixes of these ingredients or even additional ingredients, giving it a unique flavor. The notable difference between Malaysian and Indonesian telur pindang is the use of teak leaves, which are replaced with other leaves in most traditional Malaysian telur pindang recipes.

== See also ==
- Balado
- Nasi ambeng
