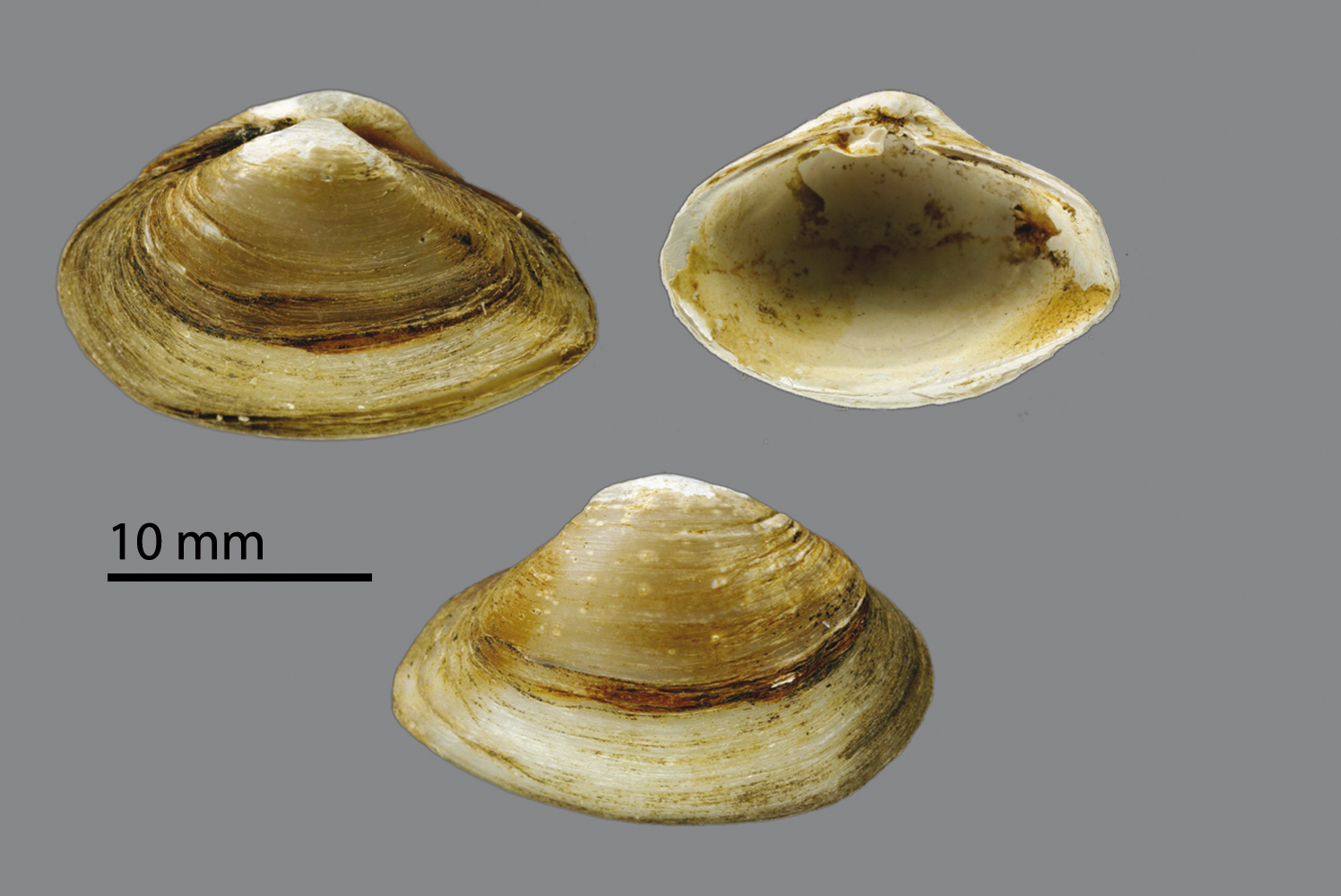
- Shell of Potamocorbula laevis (specimen at MNHN, Paris)

Scientific classification
- Kingdom: Animalia
- Phylum: Mollusca
- Class: Bivalvia
- Order: Myida
- Family: Corbulidae
- Genus: Potamocorbula
- Species: P. laevis

Binomial name
- Potamocorbula laevis (Hinds, 1843

Synonyms
- Corbula laevis Hinds, 1843

= Potamocorbula laevis =

Species of bivalve

Potamocorbula laevis is a species of marine bivalve in the family Corbulidae. It is an intertidal species that occurs in the Western Pacific in the Philippines, Hong Kong, China, and Taiwan. It was originally described in 1843 by Richard Brinsley Hinds (1812–1847) under the protonym of Corbula laevis from specimens collected at Hong Kong.
