= Arem-arem =

Indonesian traditional rice cake

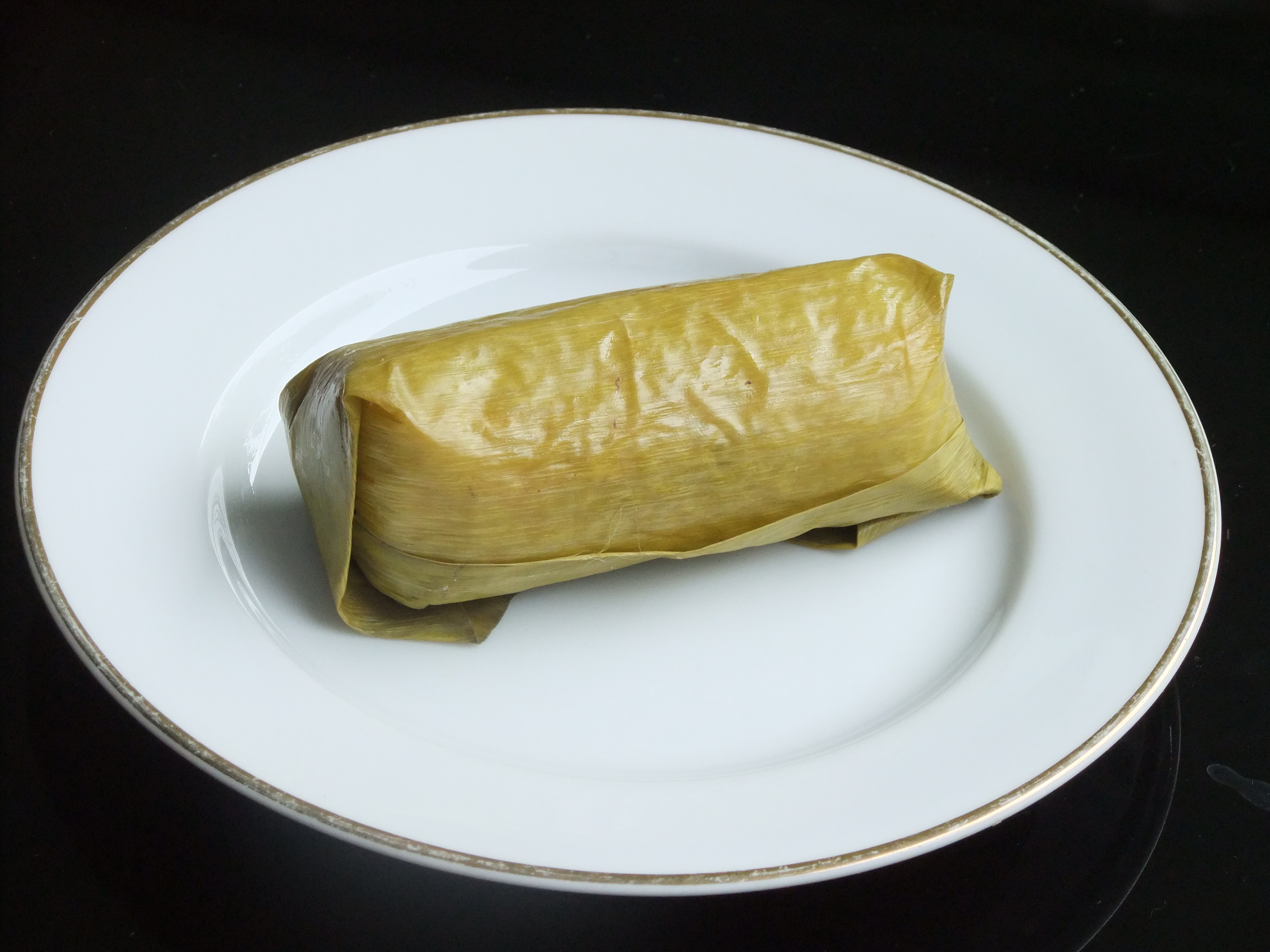
- Arem-arem
- Course: Main course
- Place of origin: Indonesia
- Region or state: Java
- Serving temperature: Room temperature
- Main ingredients: compressed rice cooked in banana leaf with vegetables or minced meat fillings.
- Variations: Different fillings, also related to lemper

Arem-arem is an Indonesian-Javanese compressed rice cake in the form of a cylinder wrapped inside a banana leaf, filled with diced vegetables, tempeh, or oncom, and eaten as a snack. It is sometimes also filled with minced meat or abon (beef floss). Arem-arem is often described as a smaller size lontong with fillings, so it is sometimes also called lontong isi (lit. 'filled lontong').

It is common in Java, and often found in Indonesian marketplaces as jajan pasar ("market munchies"), a type of kue (snack) offered there. Arem-arem is served at traditional ceremonies, family gatherings, birthdays or office meetings, and is often presented in a snack box. It is quite similar to lemper, but uses regular rice instead of sticky rice.

== Variants and fillings ==
The rice is cooked with coconut milk, and stuffed with diced vegetables (carrot, common bean, and potato), cooked minced meat (beef or chicken), abon (beef floss), or tofu, oncom and tempeh. There are a lot of arem-arem variants, which mostly differ according to their fillings, the availability of ingredients, and also the creativity of the creator.

Arem-arem usually uses a thin young banana leaf as a wrapper. Lontong, on the other hand, usually uses thicker, mature banana leaves. The texture of arem-arem snacks is usually softer compared to those of common lontong or sticky lemper, due to thinner banana leaves, the addition of coconut milk, and a prolonged steaming or boiling period.

== See also ==
- Pastil
- Bakchang
- Burasa
- Lemper
- Lepet
- Tamale
- Onigiri
