= Sayur sop =

Indonesian vegetable soup dish

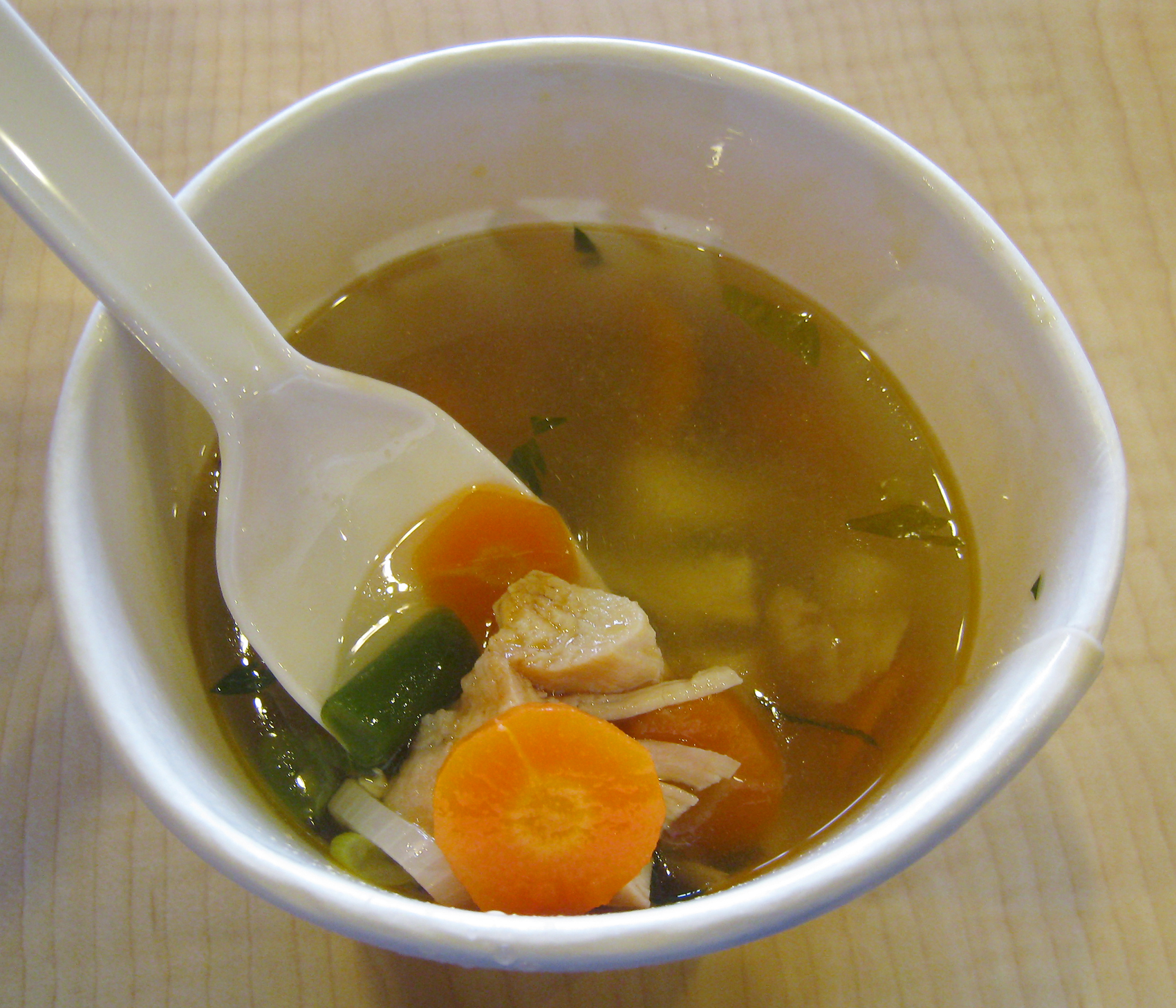
- Alternative names: Sayur sup
- Course: Main course (breakfast or lunch)
- Place of origin: Indonesia
- Region or state: Nationwide in Indonesia
- Created by: Indonesians
- Serving temperature: hot
- Main ingredients: Various vegetables, macaroni, and bakso or sausage in chicken or beef broth

Sayur sop is an Indonesian vegetable soup prepared from vegetables in chicken or beef broth. It is popular in Indonesia, served as breakfast or lunch.

== Ingredients ==
Sayur sop is made up of carrot, cabbage, cauliflower, potato, tomato, broccoli, leek, mushroom, snap bean, macaroni and bakso or sausage, spiced with black pepper, garlic and shallot in chicken or beef broth. Fried shallots and celery can be added to sayur sop.

Sayur sop is a comfort food, and is commonly served with steamed rice, tempeh, and bakwan jagung.

== See also ==
- Cuisine of Indonesia
- List of soups
- List of Indonesian soups
- Sayur asem
- Sayur bayam
- Sayur lodeh
- Sayur oyong
- Sup ercis
- Sup wortel
