= Tekwan =

Indonesian fish soup dish

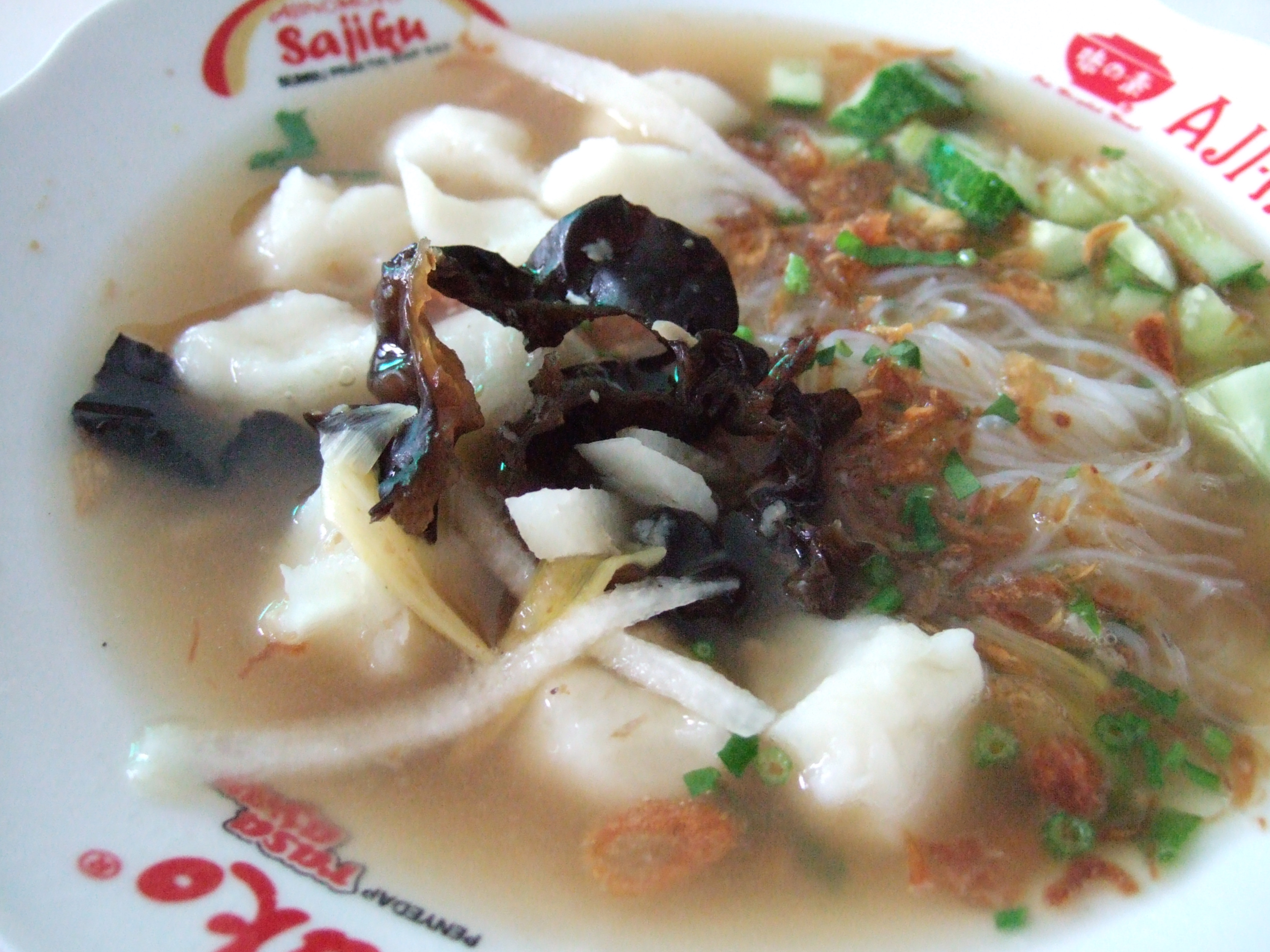
- Tekwan, a specialty of Palembang
- Course: Main course
- Place of origin: Indonesia (Palembang)
- Region or state: Main: Palembang of South Sumatra; Also spread to: Jambi, Bengkulu, and Northern Lampung, but also popular nationwide across Indonesia due to Palembang influence
- Created by: Palembang
- Serving temperature: Hot
- Main ingredients: Fish cake, shrimp broth, rice vermicelli, mushroom, jicama, celery, scallion, shallot

Tekwan is a soup dish originating from the Indonesian region of Palembang. The dish contains small fish cakes made of local Musi river fish similar to pempek, and is served with savory shrimp broth, rice vermicelli, mushrooms, and sliced jicama, sprinkled with sliced fresh celery, scallions, and fried shallots.

== Etymology ==
Tekwan name originated from Hokkien tâi-oân (台丸), homophonically similar to Taiwan (Chinese: 台灣; Pe̍h-ōe-jī: Tâi-oân).

== Ingredient ==
There are three basics recipe for tekwan:

1. Fish balls
2. Broth
3. Seasonings
4. Topping

== See also ==
- List of fish dishes
- List of Indonesian soups
- List of soups
