= List of Indonesian soups =

Indonesian soups list

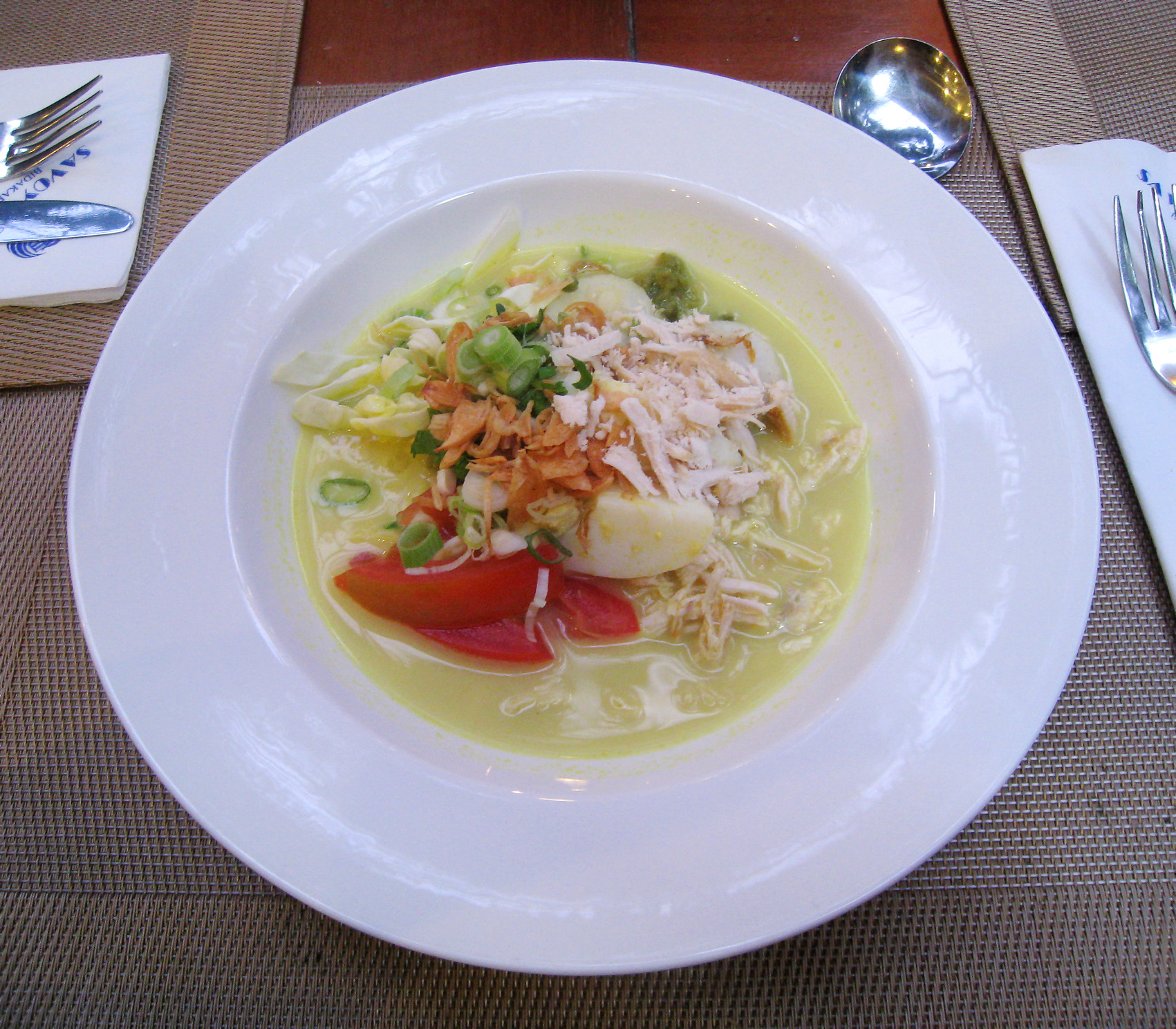
Soto ayam, Indonesian counterpart of chicken soup.

This is a list of Indonesian soups. Indonesian cuisine is diverse, in part because Indonesia is composed of approximately 6,000 populated islands of the total 18,000 in the world's largest archipelago, with more than 600 ethnic groups. Many regional cuisines exist, often based upon indigenous culture and foreign influences. Indonesian soups are known to be flavoursome with generous amount of bumbu spice mixture.

Indonesian cuisine has a diverse variety of soups. Some Indonesian soups may be served as meals, while others are lighter. The Makassarese of South Sulawesi, Indonesia are known for preparing "hearty beef soups" that also use coconut and lemongrass as ingredients.

== Variety ==
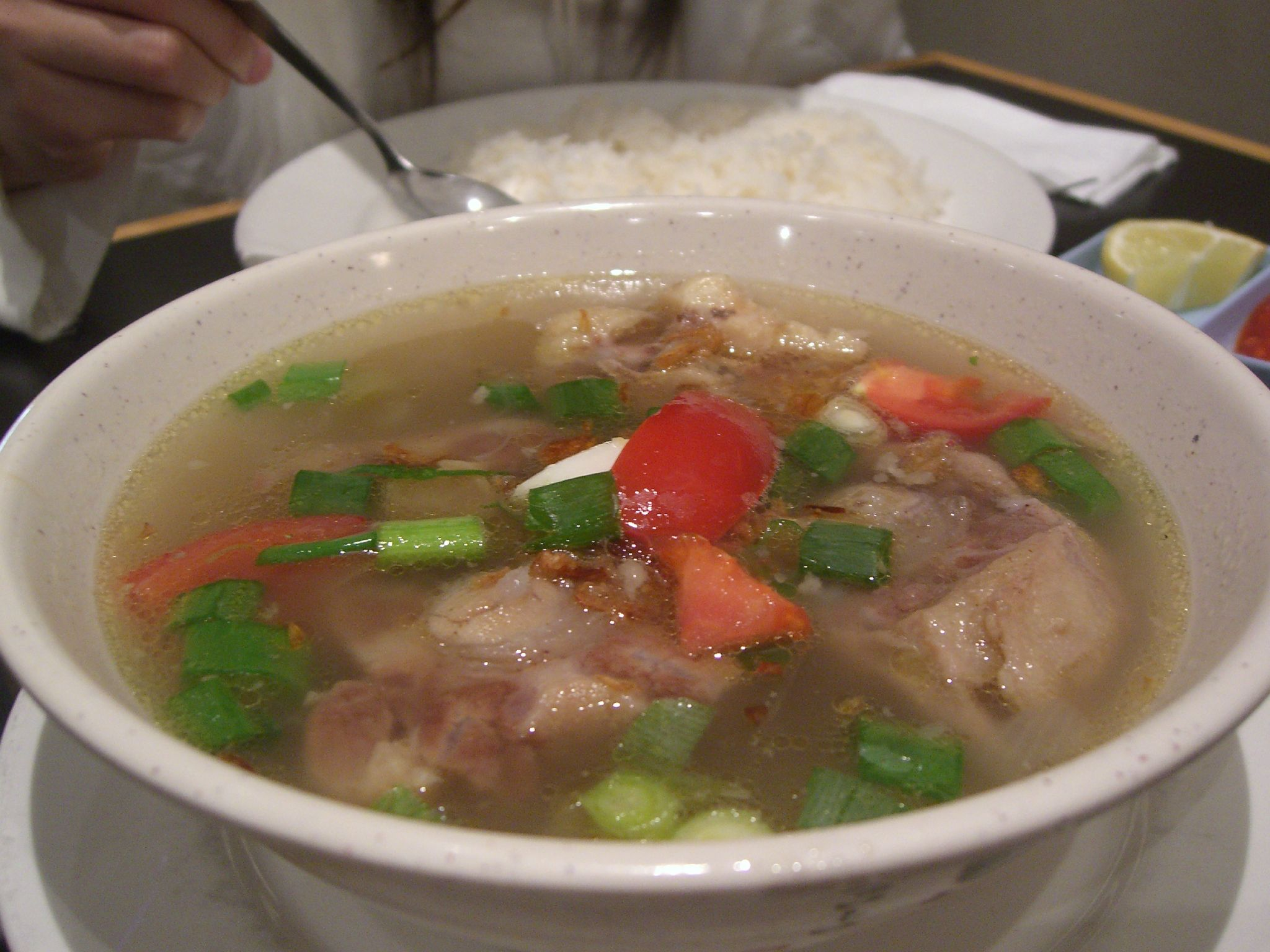
Sop buntut, Indonesian oxtail soup.

Generally Indonesian soups and stews are grouped into four major groups with numbers of variants in between.

1. Soto refer to variety of Indonesian traditionally spiced meat soups, either in clear broth or in rich coconut milk-base soup, example includes soto ayam.
2. Sayur refer to traditional vegetables stews, such as sayur asem and sayur lodeh.
3. Sop or sup usually refer to soups derived from western influences, such as sop buntut.
4. Mi kuah refer to various noodle soups of Indonesia, usually refer to noodle soups derived from Chinese and Peranakan influences, such as mi bakso kuah and laksa. In Indonesia, noodles are not normally classed as soup, since the dry stir fried version of noodle is also common in the country.

This list includes soups that originated in Indonesia as well as those that are common in the country.

== Indonesian soups and stews ==
=== Soto (traditional soups) ===
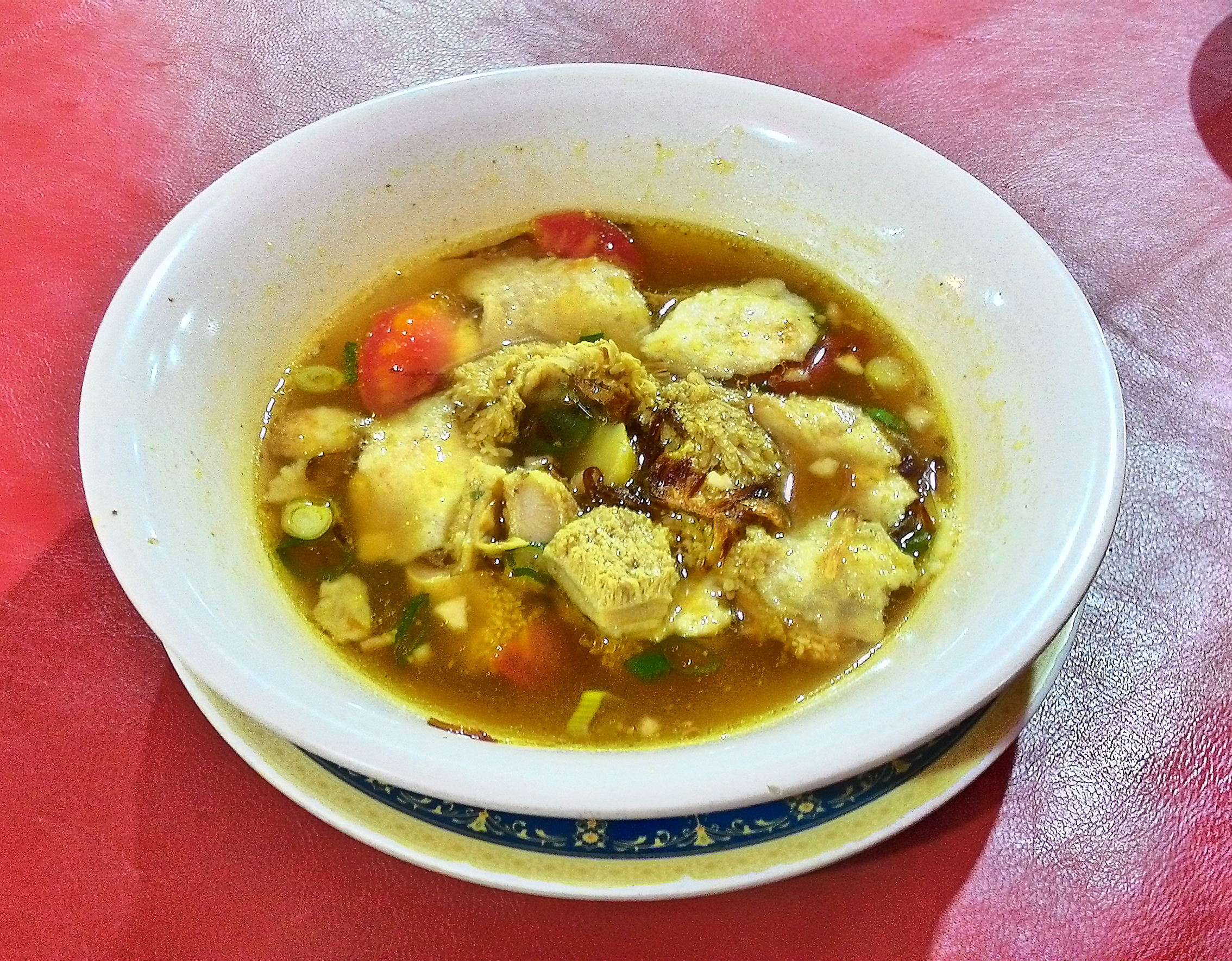
Soto babat, tripe soto.

- Soto – a traditional meat soup. Many variations exist.
- Soto ayam – chicken soto,
- Soto babat – tripe soto.
- Soto babi – Balinese pork soto.
- Soto daging – beef soup, usually eat with jeroan (offal) or quail egg satay.
- Soto padang – beef rice noodle soup with potatoes and egg, specialty of Padang.
- Sroto or soto sokaraja – soto with peanut sambal.
- Soto Betawi – beef or chicken soup originating in West Java with a coconut milk infused broth usually eaten with emping.
- Coto makassar – Makassarese beef soup, a traditional beef and offal soto variant from Makassar, South Sulawesi.

=== Sayur (vegetable soups) ===
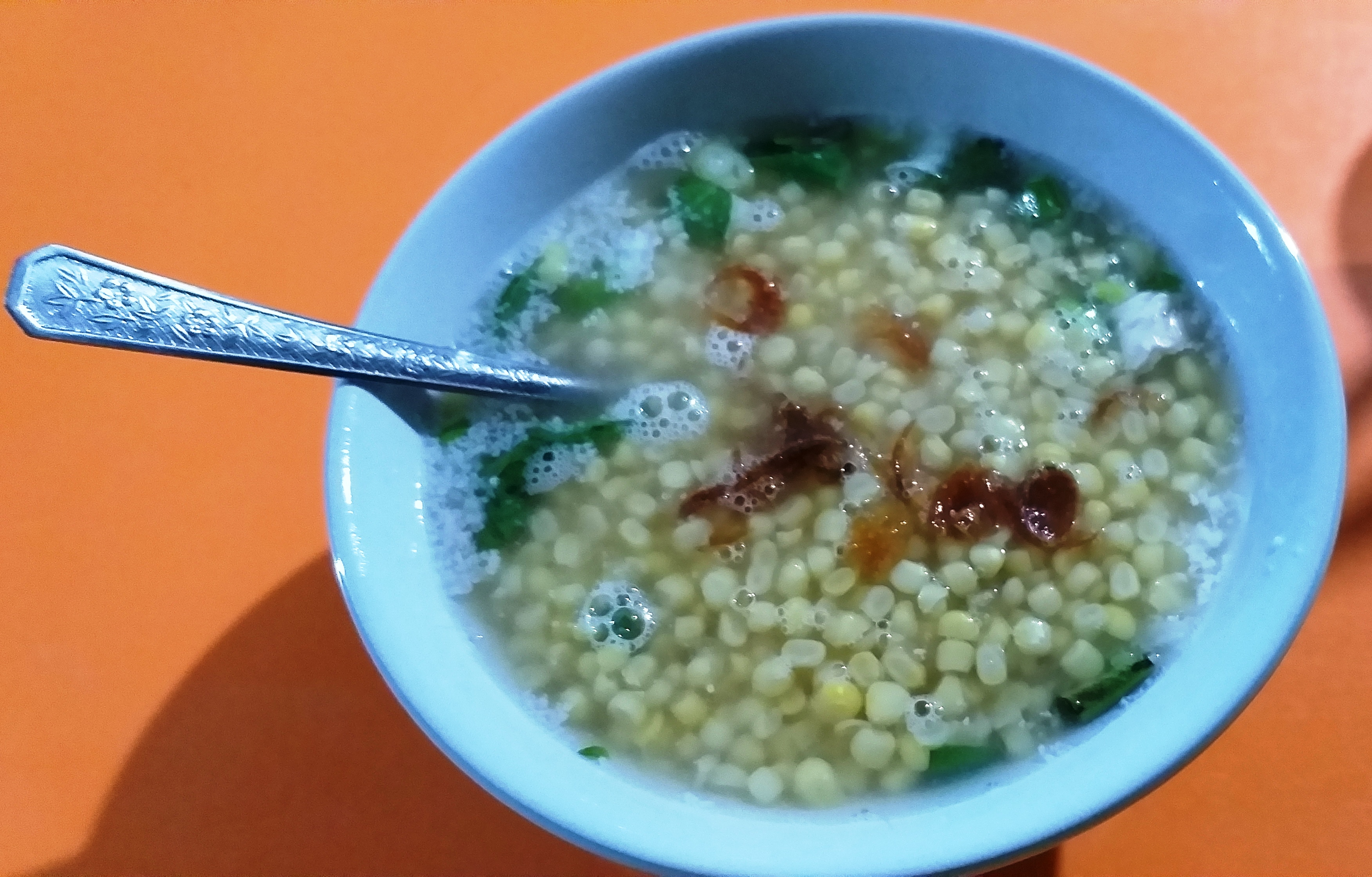
Binte biluhuta or milu siram, a corn soup with skipjack tuna and shrimp.

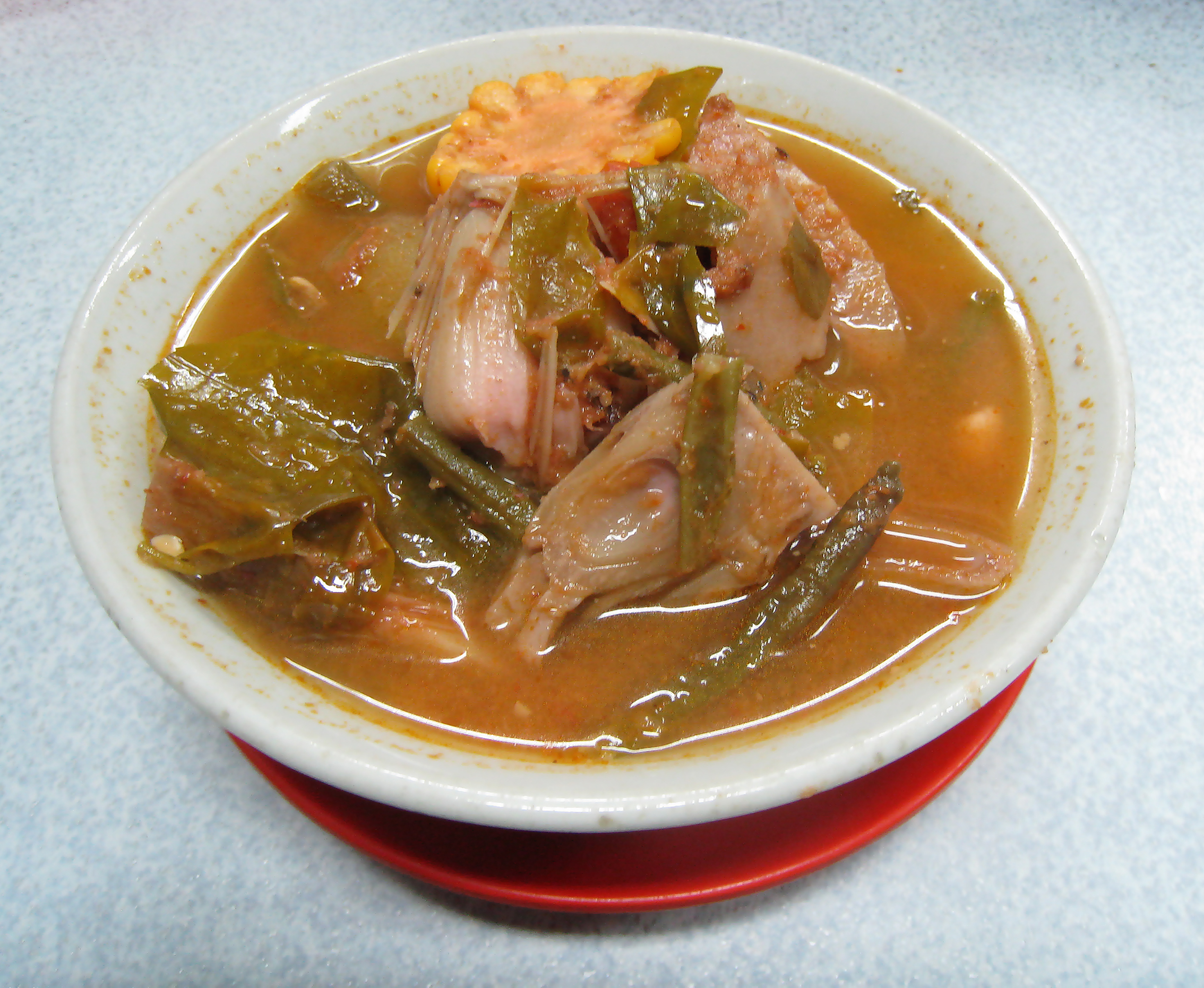
Sayur asem, vegetable tamarind soup.

- Binte biluhuta or milu siram - corn soup from Gorontalese cuisine with a unique flavour due to sweetness from the maize, sourness from starfruit and lime, and spiciness from chilies. It is enriched with cakalang (skipjack tuna) and shrimp.
- Brenebon or sayur kacang merah – red kidney bean soup, served in broth made from boiled pig's trotters, beef or chicken.
- Sayur asem – uses tamarind as a main ingredient, along with vegetables, chayote, bilimbi and melinjo
- Sayur bayam or sayur bening – spinach and corn in clear soup flavoured with temu kunci.
- Sayur lodeh – vegetables in coconut milk soup.
- Sayur sop – vegetables soup (common beans, carrot, cabbages, potato, celery, cauliflower, fried shallots), in chicken broth soup, often includes diced chicken.
- Sayur oyong – clear vegetable soup made of okra or Luffa acutangula.
- Sup ercis or erten – soup made of thick stew of green split peas, celeriac or stalk celery, onions, leeks, carrots, and often potato.
- Sup wortel – soup prepared with carrot as a primary ingredient. It can be prepared as a cream or broth-style soup.

=== Chicken soups ===
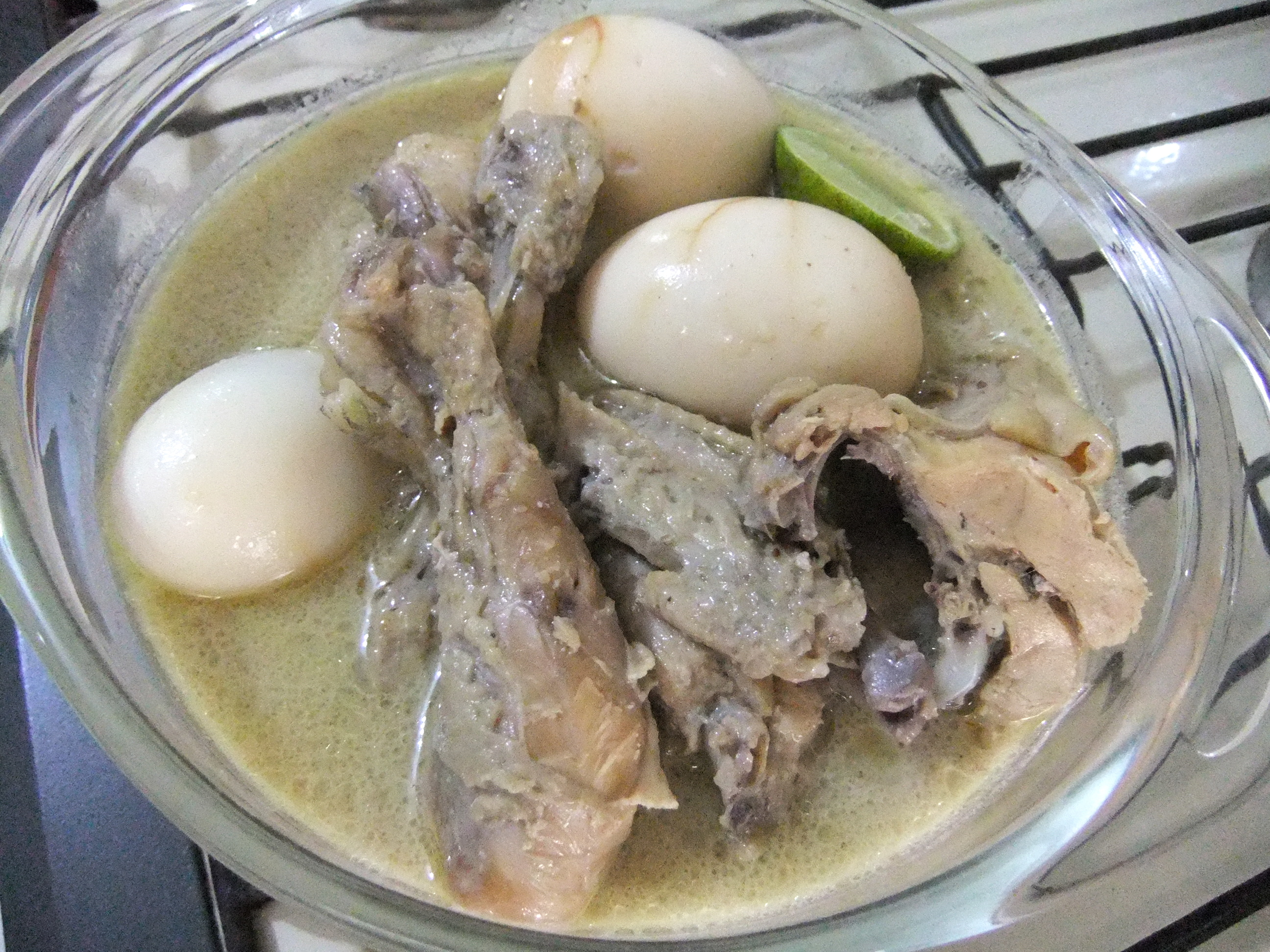
Opor ayam, chicken in coconut milk soup.

- Ayam buah keluak – chicken rib stew cooked with the nuts from the Pangium edule.
- Opor ayam – prepared with the main ingredients of chicken cooked in coconut milk. It is especially common in Central Java. Many additional ingredients are used.
- Sup ayam – Indonesian chicken soup with a variety of vegetables, such as carrots, potatoes, cabbage and mushrooms.
- Sup krim – a creamy soup with addition of milk is obviously derived from western influence, and today is quite common in Indonesia. Variants include sup krim ayam (with chicken), sup krim jamur (with mushroom), and sup krim asparagus (with asparagus).

=== Fish or seafood soups ===
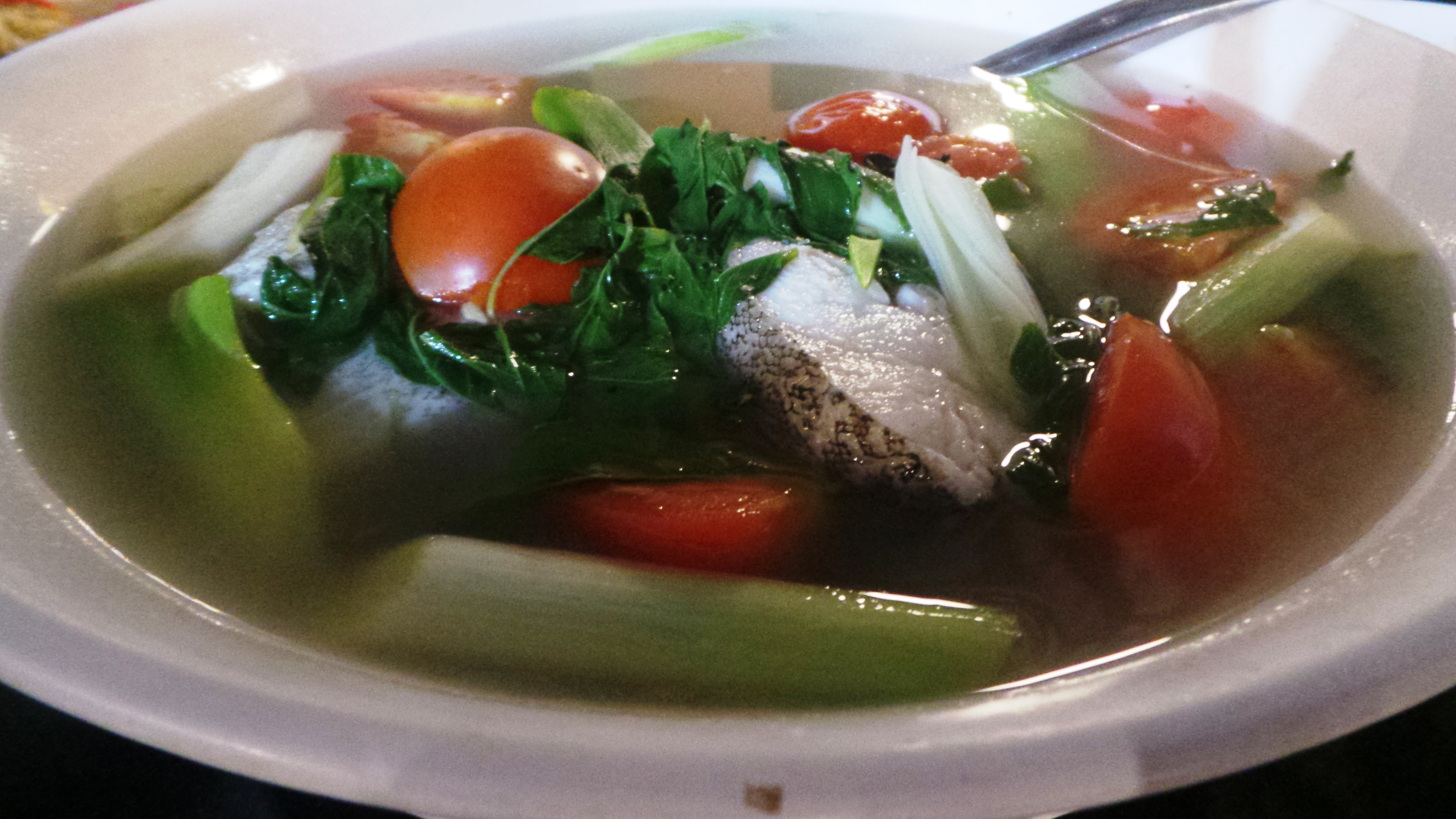
Ikan kerapu kuah asam, grouper in sour soup from Manado.

- Asam pedas – sour and spicy fish stew dish.
- Bakso ikan – fish meatball soup.
- Ikan kuah kuning – fish soup in clear yellow broth. It is a side dish of papeda and be a delicacy from Maluku and Papua.
- Kapurung – sago and fish soup from South Sulawesi.
- Mangut – Javanese coconut milk fish soup.
- Pindang – fish boiled in salt and sour-tasting spices, usually tamarind.
- Pindang koyong – fish cooked in yellow gravy-like soto with various spices, specialty of Banyuwangi, East Java.
- Pindang serani – pindang made from various kind of seafood and milkfish.
- Pindang tongkol – pindang variant using pindang processed mackerel tuna.
- Sup cakalang kuah kuning – Skipjack tuna in yellow spicy soup speciality of Manado, North Sulawesi. Spice mixture include turmeric, ginger, candlenut, garlic, shallot, chili pepper and lemongrass.
- Sup ikan – fish soup, specialty of Batam island near Singapore. Usually uses red snapper and dried shrimp, seasoned with shallot, garlic, pepper, soy sauce, fish sauce, add with tomato, scallion and bawang goreng.
- Sup ikan kuah asam – seafood fish in sour soup speciality of Gorontalo cuisine, Gorontalo Peninsula and Minahasan cuisine, North Sulawesi. Various fish can be made sour soup, including grouper, trevally or red snapper.
- Sup krim kepiting – a crab creamy soup.
- Sup udang pedas – hot and spicy shrimp soup, made of shrimp, dried shrimp, fishballs, mushroom, carrot, scallion, garlic and chili pepper.
- Tekwan – surimi fishcake akin to pempek, bihun rice noodle, jicama and mushroom soup, specialty of Palembang.

=== Meat and offal soups ===
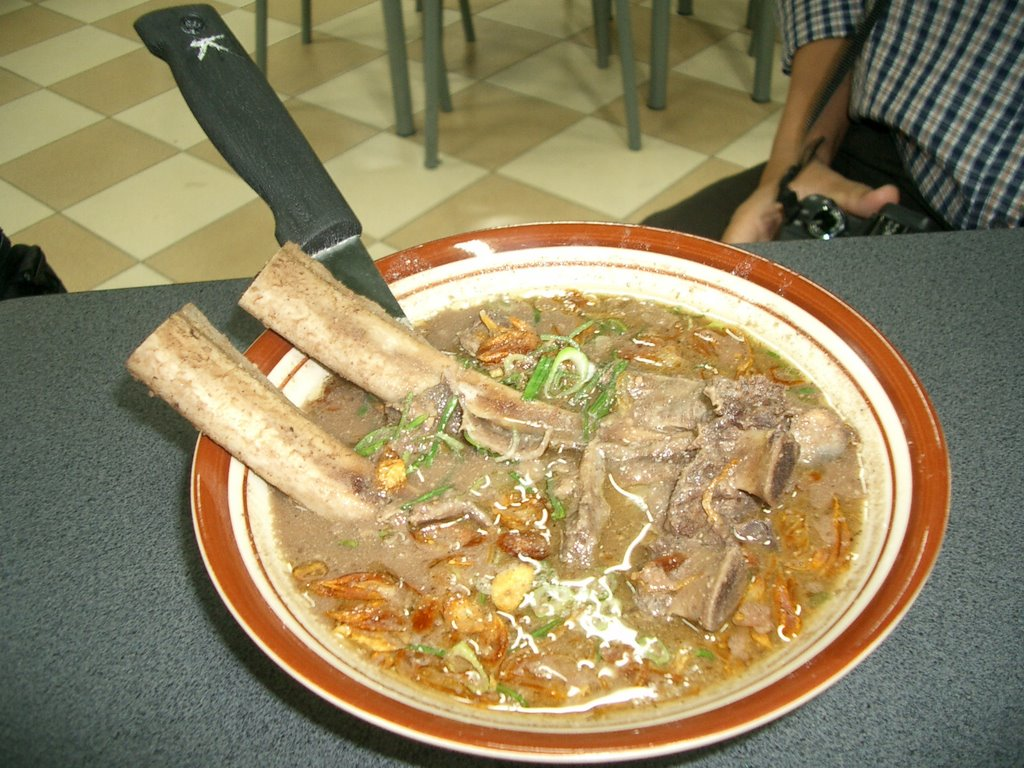
Konro, spicy ribs soup.

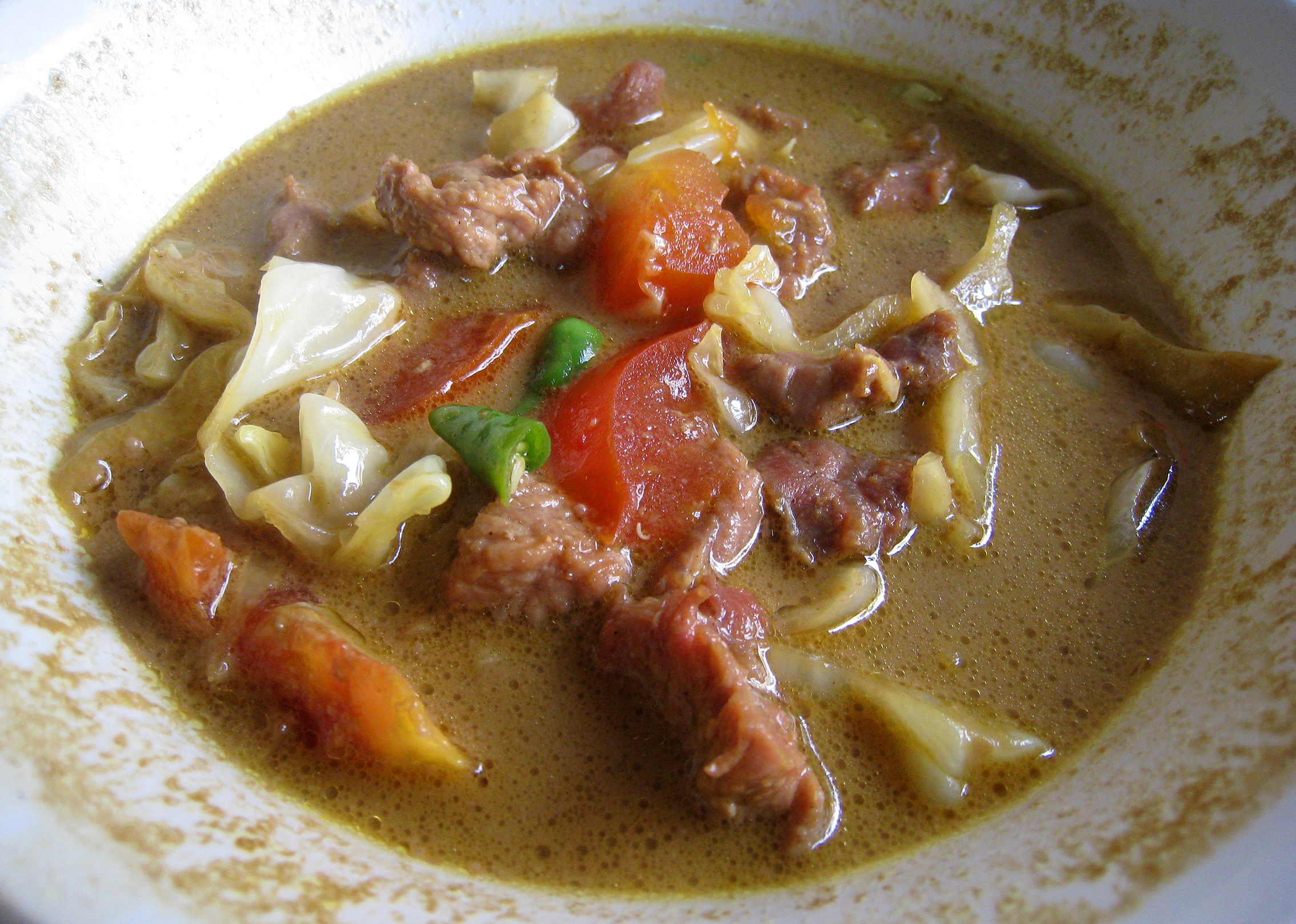
Tongseng, sweet and spicy goat meat soup.

- Bak kut teh – a pork rib dish cooked in broth, herbs, and spices.
- Bakso – a meatball soup. Meats used may include beef, pork, chicken, and mixtures of these meats. Additional ingredients often include bok choy, tofu, hard-boiled egg, fried shallots and wontons. It has been described as a national street food of Indonesia.
- Balungan – bakso soup that adds balungan (bone) in portions.
- Brongkos – spicy meat and beans stew, specialty of Yogyakarta and Central Java.
- Empal gentong – spicy beef offal soup specialty of Cirebon, West Java.
- Feijoada – a Timorese bean soup with beef and pork, influenced by Portuguese cuisine.
- Gulai – stew curry dish with main ingredients might be poultry, goat meat, beef, mutton, various kinds of offal, fish and seafood, and also vegetables such as cassava leaves and unripe jackfruit.
- Kaledo – a traditional spicy cow's trotters soup from Donggala regency, Central Sulawesi.
- Katemak – beef soup served with sweet potatoes, sweet corns, and some green vegetables such as cassava leaves and papaya leaves.
- Konro – spicy ribs soup specialty of Makassar, South Sulawesi.
- Marak – goat meat soup dish with pumpkin and chicken meat.
- Pallubasa – spicy beef or buffalo soup specialty of Makassar, South Sulawesi.
- Rawon – a beef soup in black keluak soup that originated from East Java
- Saksang – pork, dog, or water buffalo meat stew cooked in its blood, mixed with coconut milk and spices.
- Saltah – stew made of marak, a dollop of fenugreek froth, and sahawiq based on Arab Indonesian cuisine.
- Semur – meat stew (usually beef) with sweet soy sauce and spices.
- Sop buntut – oxtail soup.
- Sekba – or sometimes called bektim is a Chinese Indonesian pork offals stewed in mild soy sauce-based soup.
- Sop iga – an indonesian cow rib soup with celery, tomato, and carrot.
- Sop saudara – a spicy beef soup contains bits of beef and offals (usually fried cow's lungs), rice vermicelli, perkedel (fried potato patty) and hard boiled egg. The spices includes garlic, shallot, candlenut, coriander, caraway, ginger, galangal, lime leaf, lemongrass, nutmeg and cinnamon. Garnishing include chopped scallion and bawang goreng (crispy fried shallot).
- Sop senerek – a traditional soup from Magelang with beef, red bean, carrot, tomato, celery, and some bawang goreng.
- Sop kambing – prepared with goat meat, tomato, celery, spring onion, ginger, candlenut and lime leaf, its broth is yellow in color.
- Tengkleng – goat jeroan (offals) and tetelan (bony meat, usually from rib cage) with spicy coconut milk, specialty of Solo.
- Timlo solo – a beef and vegetable soup. Some versions also have noodles, as a beef noodle soup.
- Tabu Moitomo or "black beef soup" - a rich black soup using beef or poultry with all 30 kinds of herbs and spices imaginable.
- Tongseng – a sweet and spicy goat meat soup, specialty of Solo, Central Java.

=== Noodle soups ===
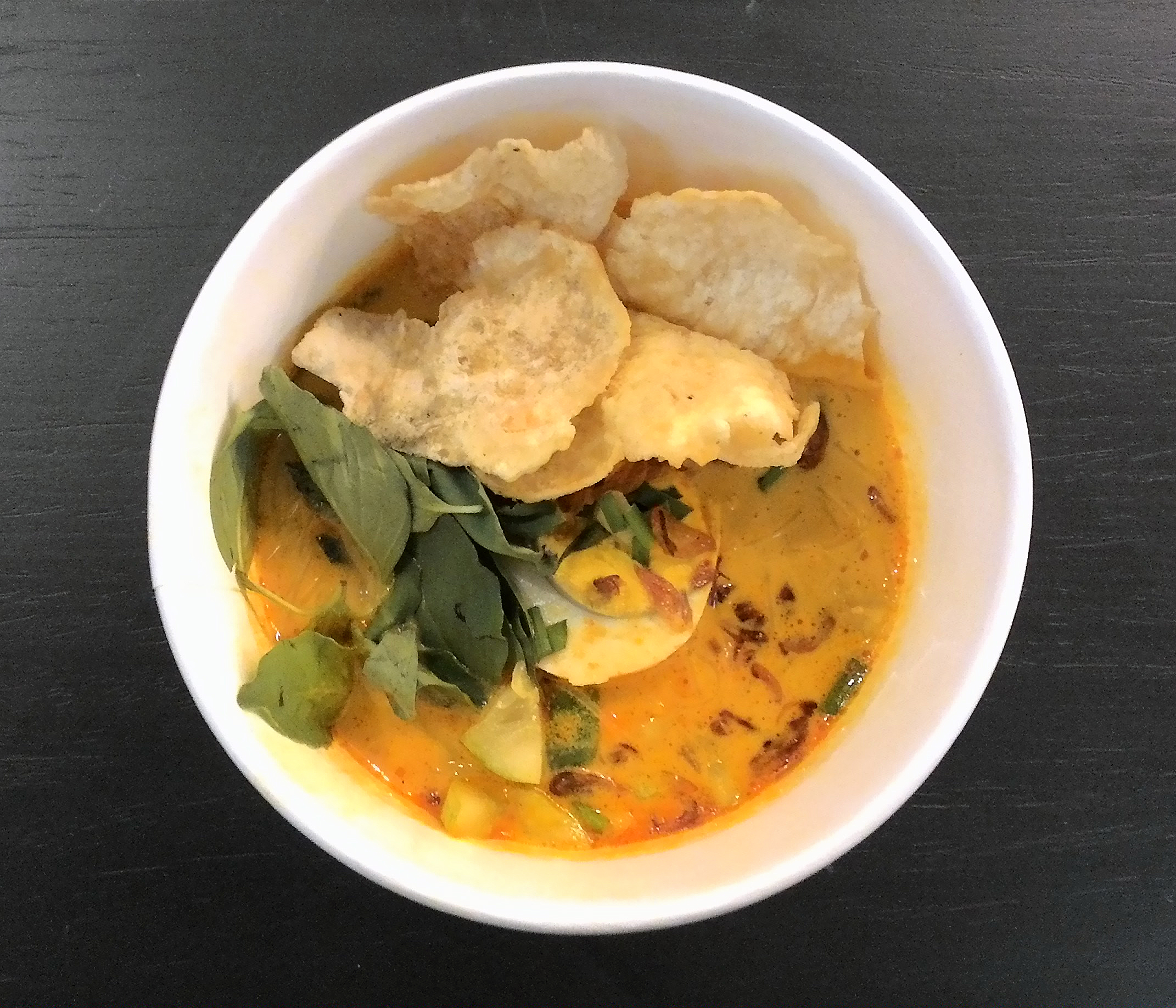
Laksa betawi, served with emping.

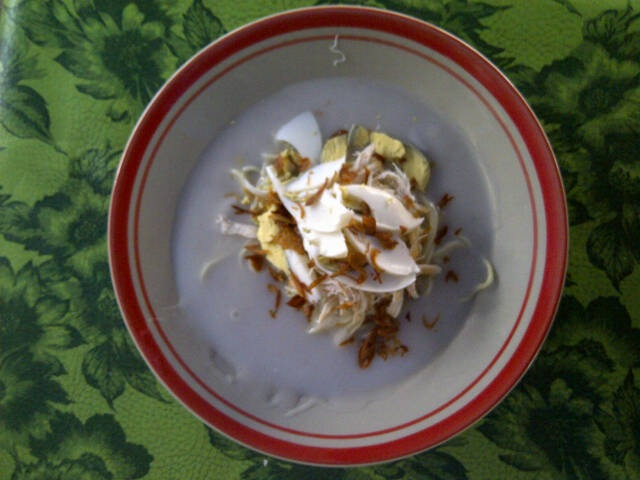
Mie koclok, chicken noodle soup.

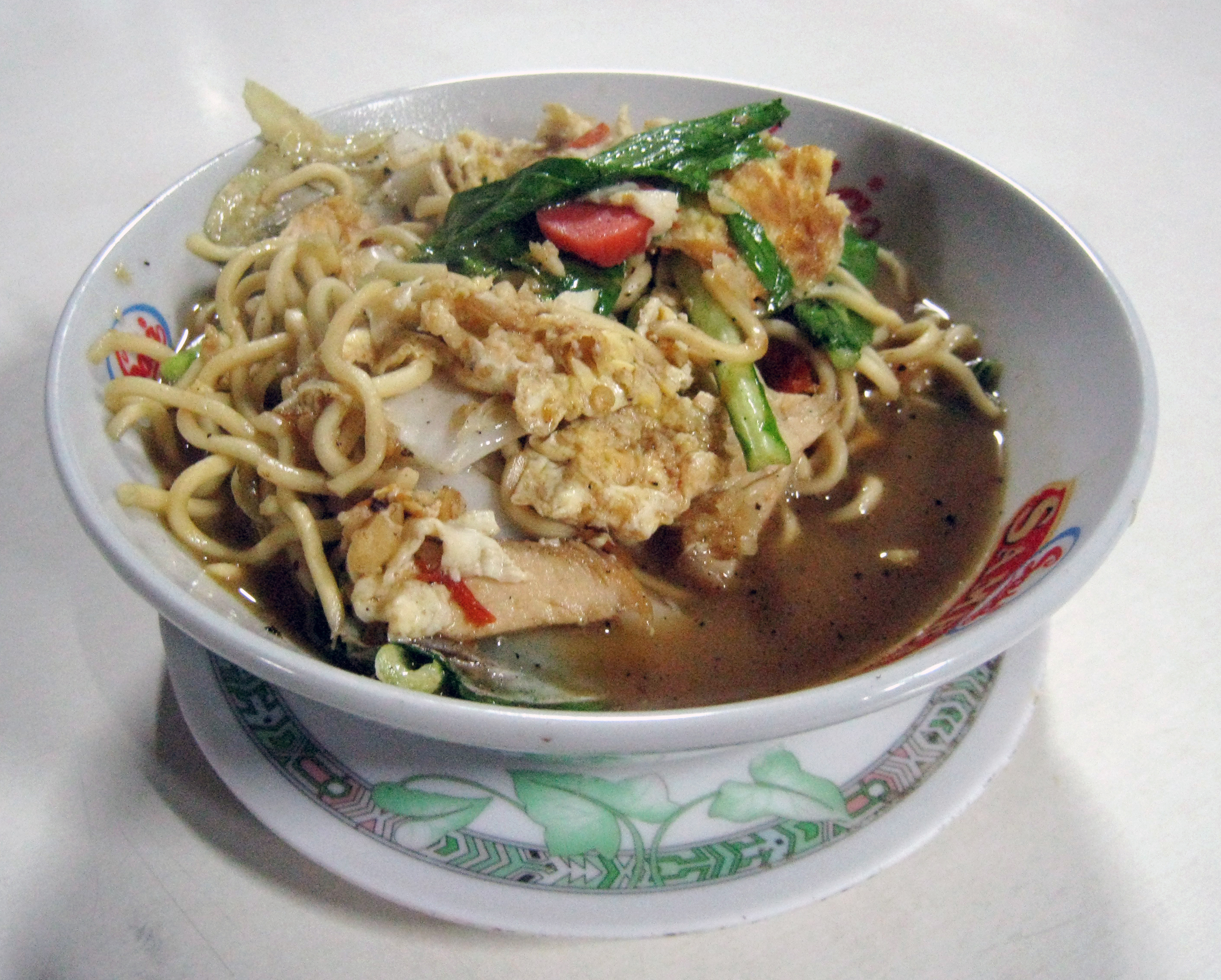
Mie kuah, boiled noodles with Javanese-style.

- Bihun kuah – rice vermicelli soup.
- Kwetiau ayam – flat noodle soup with chicken, sometimes served with pangsit (wonton) and bakso (meatball) soup.
- Beef kway teow – flat noodle soup with slices of beef or sometimes beef offal.
- Laksa – spicy noodle soup dish which has various types based on Peranakan. It consists of thick wheat noodles or rice vermicelli with chicken, prawn or fish, served in spicy soup based on either rich and spicy curry coconut milk or on sour asam.
- Laksa banjar – steamed noodle-like balls, made from rice flour paste, served in thick yellowish soup made from coconut milk, ground spices and snakehead fish broth.
- Laksa betawi – laksa contains rice vermicelli, beansprouts, and dried shrimp broth soup.
- Laksa bogor – laksa contains rice vermicelli, beansprouts, and oncom.
- Laksa cibinong – yellowish laksa made of coconut milk, spices, bean sprout, rice vermicelli, hard-boiled eggs, cooked shredded chicken, fried shallots, and many lemon-basil leaves.
- Laksa medan – asam laksa contains flaked mackerel, wild ginger flower, lemongrass, and chili pepper.
- Laksa tambelan – laksa made of flaked sauteed smoked mackerel tuna or skipjack tuna, spices and lump of sagoo noodles, served in spicy kerisik.
- Laksa tangerang – laksa made of rice noodles shaped like spaghetti, chicken stock, mung beans, potatoes and chives.
- Lakse kuah – fish curry laksa, made of sagoo noodles with mashed tongkol or mackerel tuna flesh, served in spicy coconut milk curry made of spice mixture.
- Lakso – spicy noodle soup served in savoury yellowish coconut milk-based soup, flavoured with fish, and sprinkled with fried shallots.
- Mi ayam – chicken noodle soup comprising a bowl of chicken stock, boiled choy sim, celery leaves, diced chicken cooked with sweet soy sauce, and fried shallots. Some variants add mushrooms and fried/boiled pangsit (wonton). Normally it is eaten with chili sauce and pickles.
- Mi bakso – bakso meatballs served with yellow noodles and rice vermicelli in beef broth.
- Mi cakalang – skipjack tuna noodle soup.
- Mi celor – a noodle dish served in coconut milk soup and shrimp-based broth, specialty of Palembang city, South Sumatra.
- Mi kari – soup curry noodle dish.
- Mi koclok – chicken noodle soup from Cirebon. It is served with cabbage, bean sprout, boiled egg, fried onion and spring onion.
- Mi kocok – (lit: "shaken noodle"), is an Indonesian beef noodle soup from Bandung, consists of noodles served in rich beef consommé soup, kikil (beef tendon), bean sprouts and bakso (beef meatball), kaffir lime juice, and sprinkled with sliced fresh celery, scallion and fried shallot. Some recipes might add beef tripe.
- Mi kopyok – noodle soup with garlic broth, fried tofu, and rice cracker.
- Mi kuah – literally "boiled noodles" in English, made of yellow egg noodles with a spicy soup gravy.
- Mi ongklok – boiled noodles were made using cabbage, chunks of chopped leaves, and starchy thick soup called ‘’loh’’. Usually served with satay and tempeh.
- Mi pangsit – noodle soup served with pangsit or soft-boiled wonton.
- Soto mi – noodle soup in spicy soto broth.
- Sup makaroni – Indonesian macaroni soup.

== Gallery ==
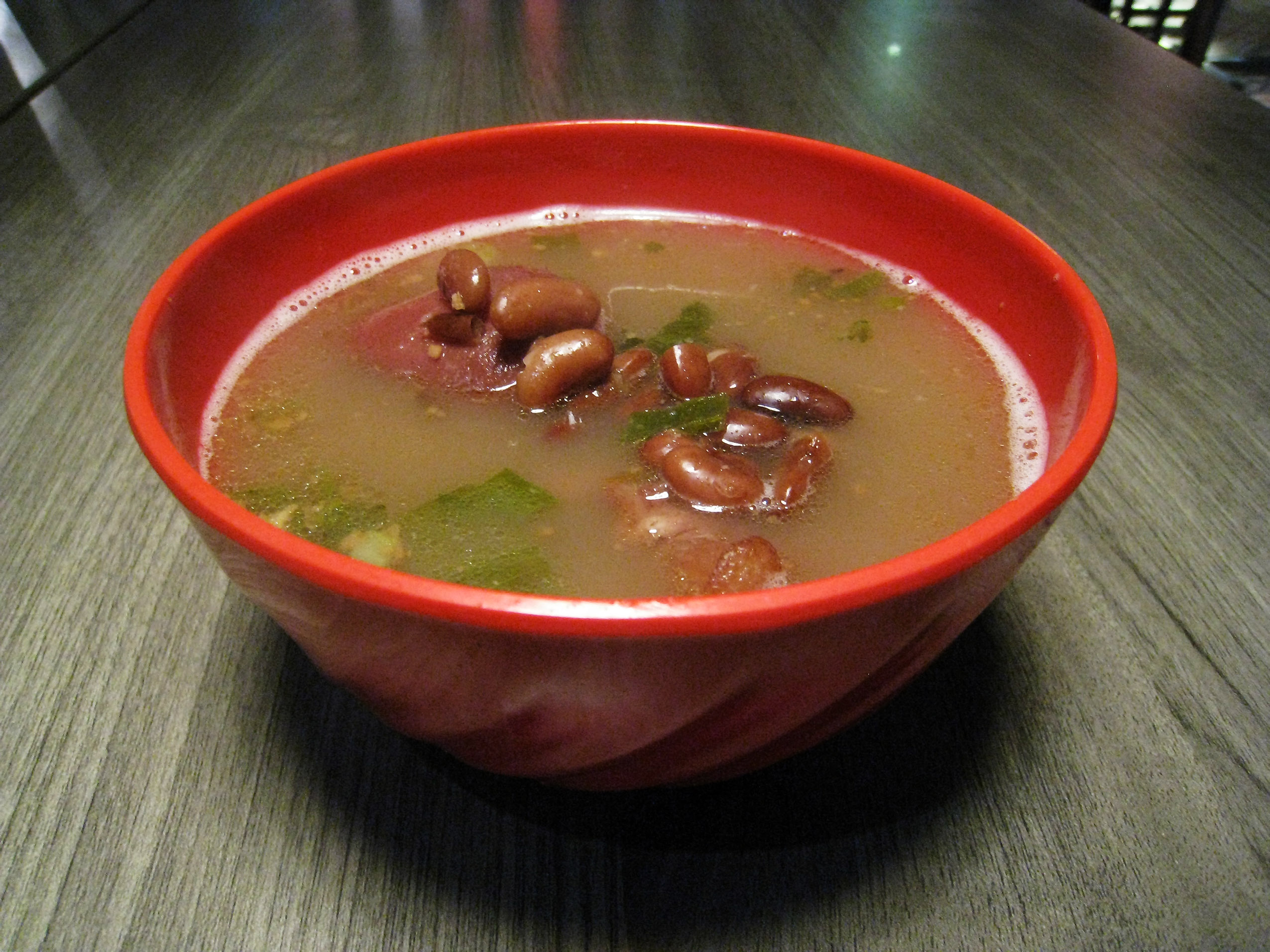
Brenebon soup from Manado.

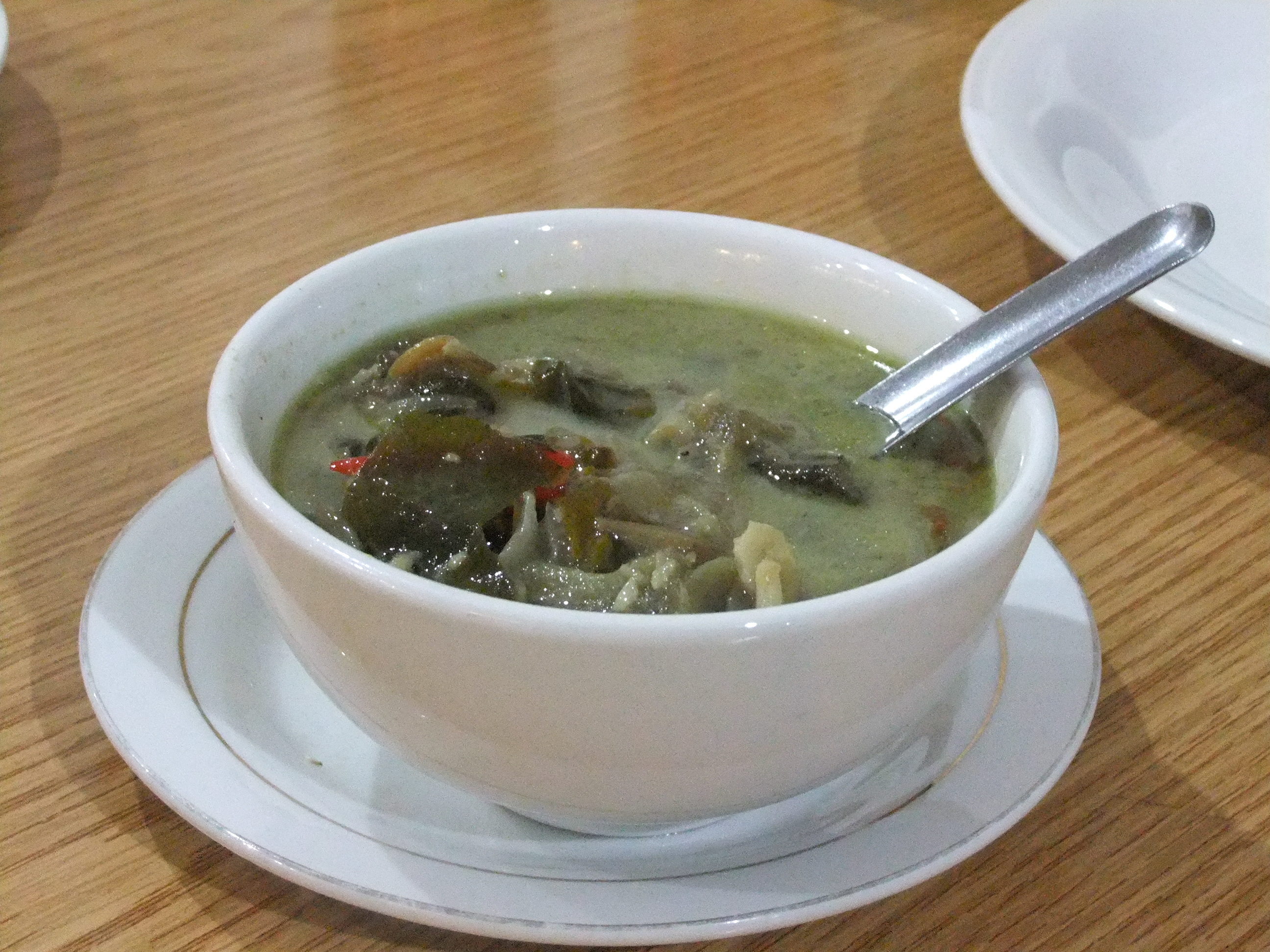
Sayur lodeh, vegetables stew in coconut milk.

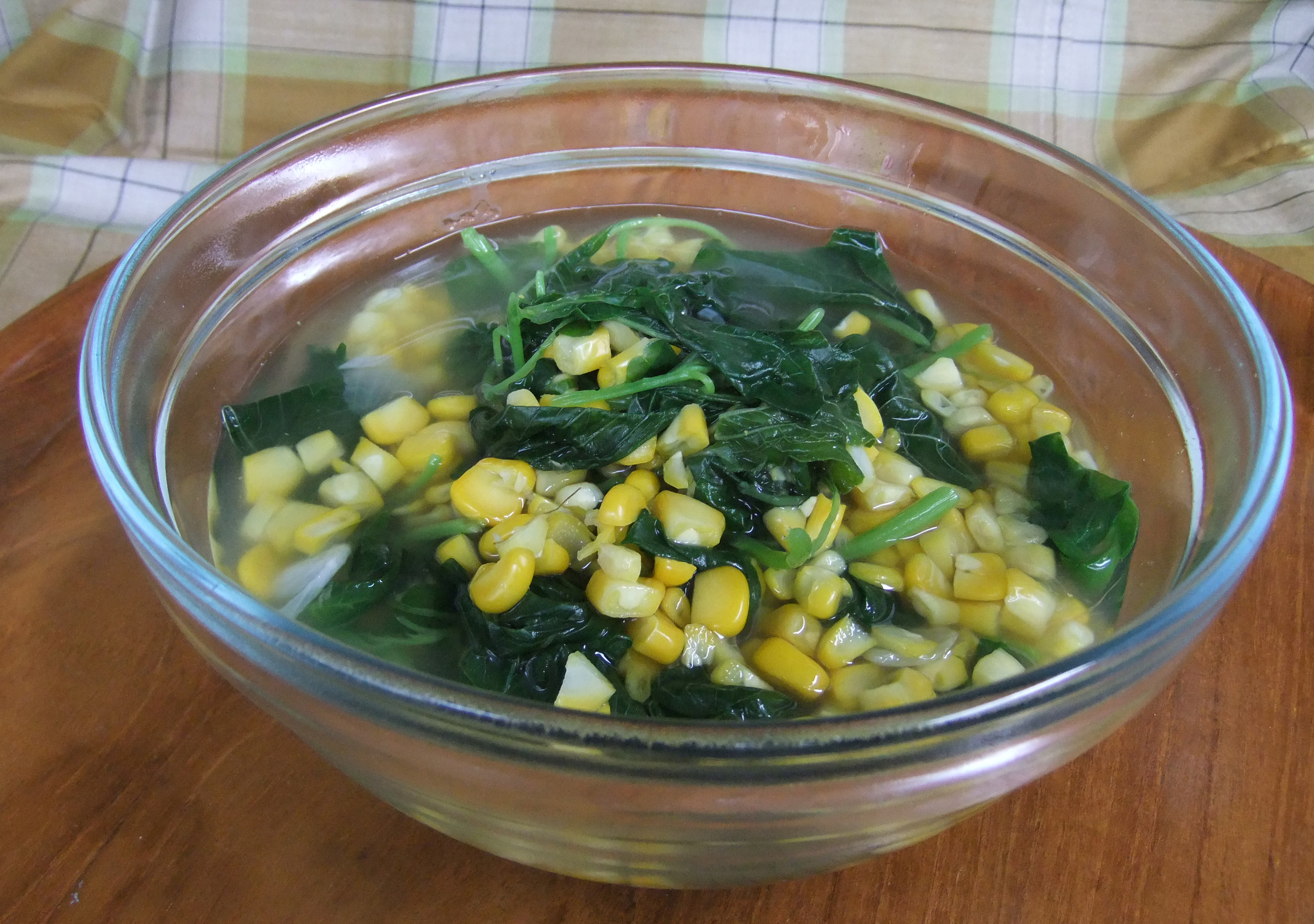
Sayur bening bayam, spinach and corn in clear soup.

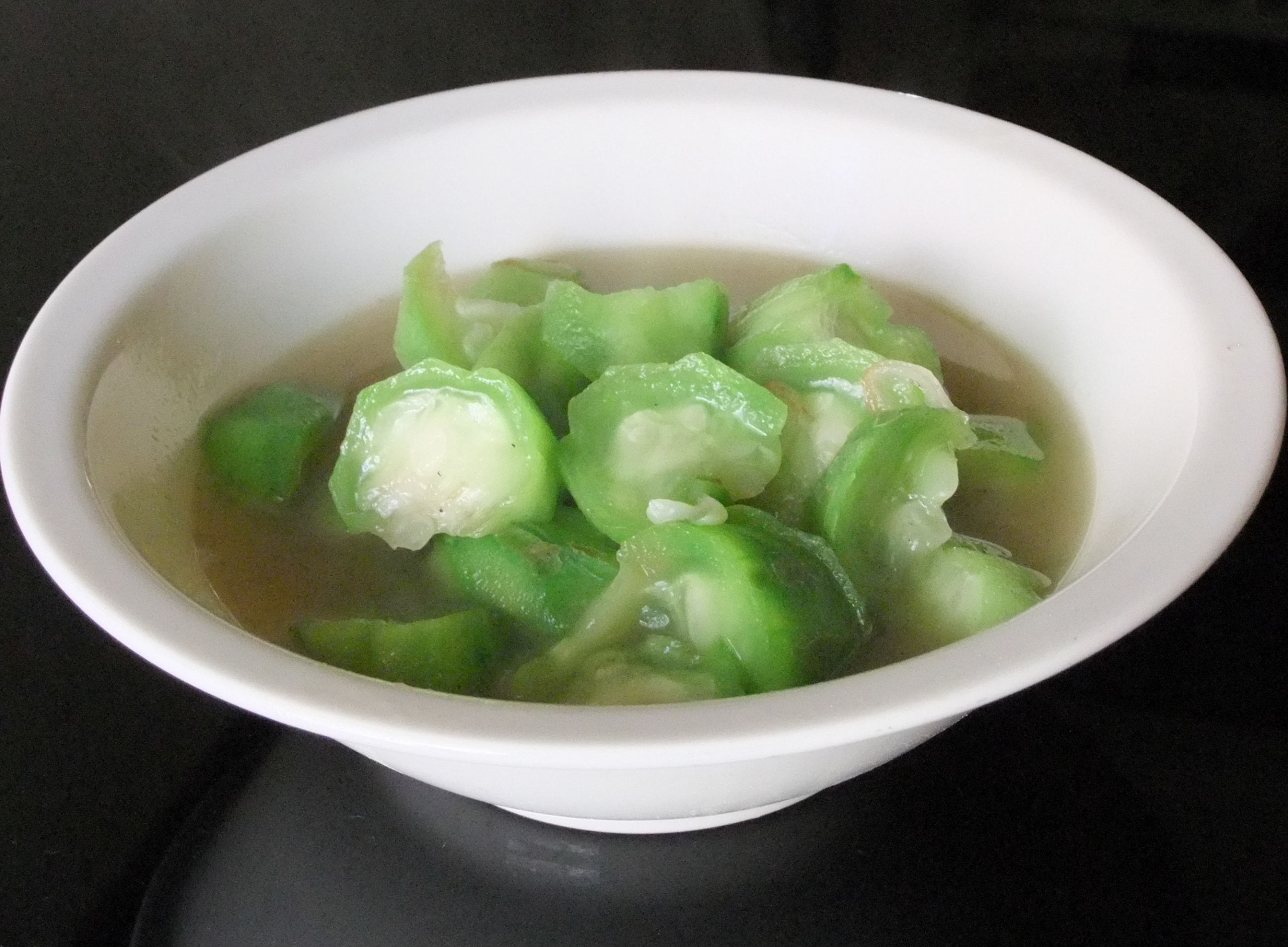
Sayur oyong made with Luffa acutangula.

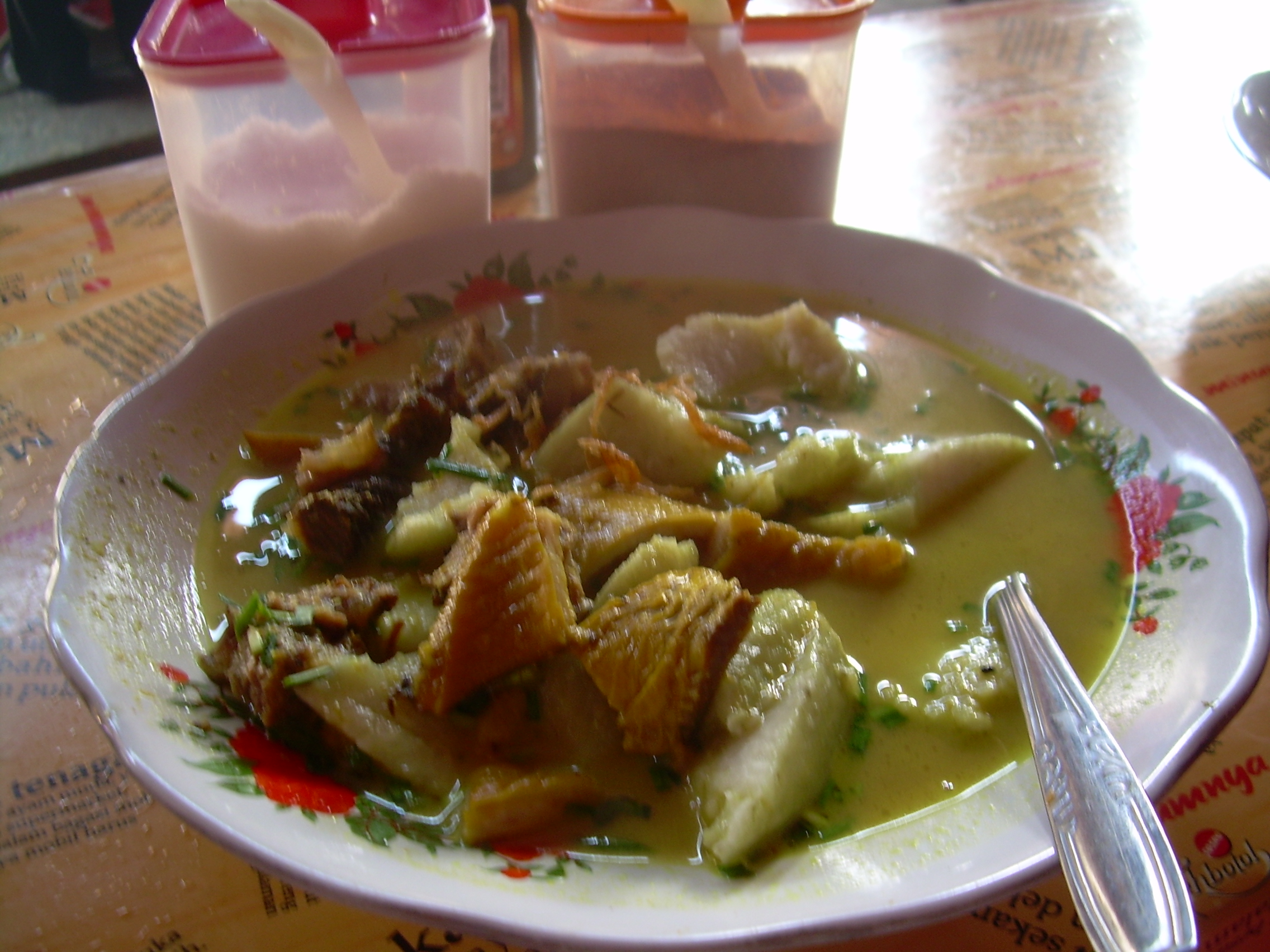
Empal gentong from Cirebon.

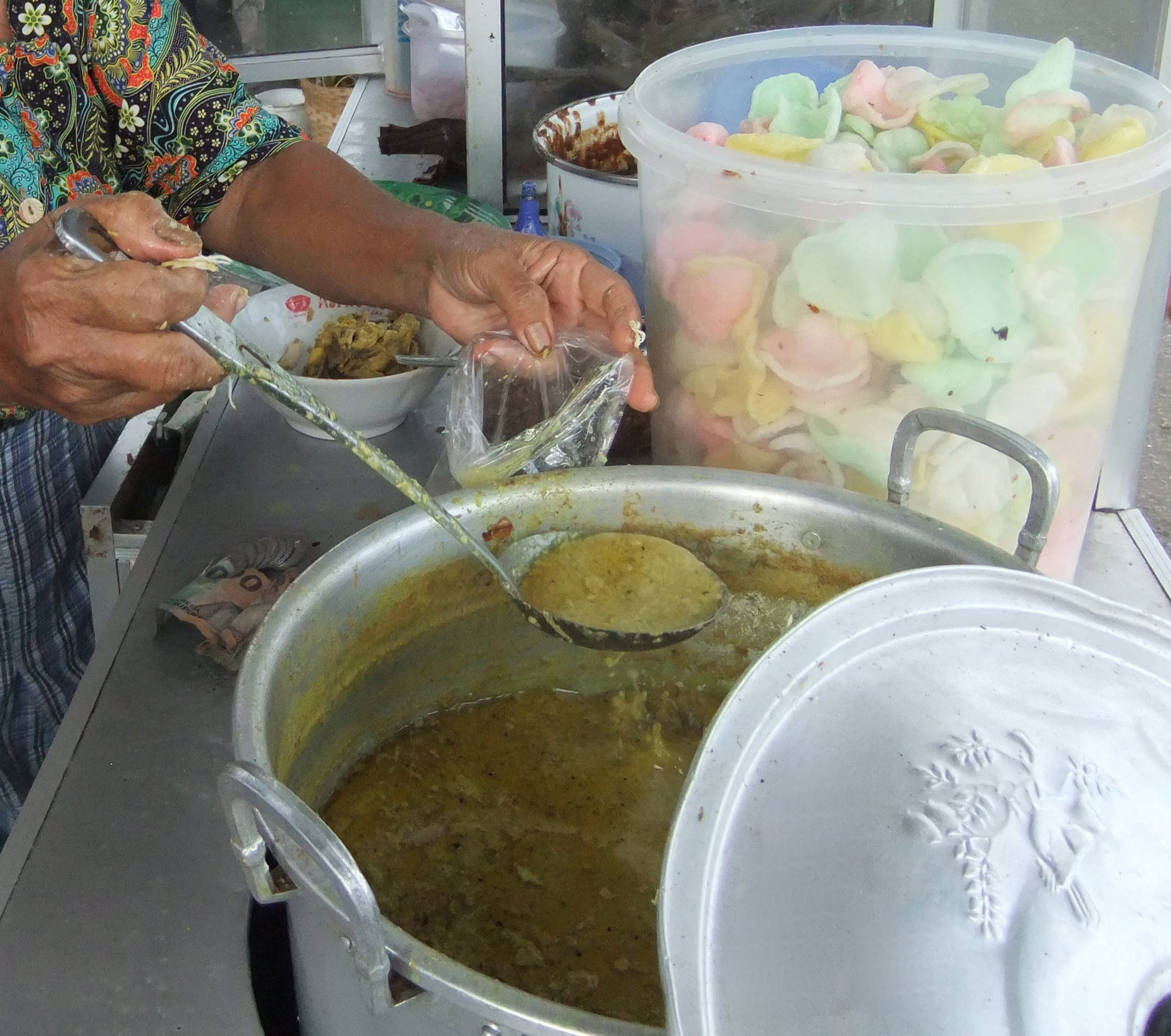
Lontong opor is a common breakfast in Cilacap.

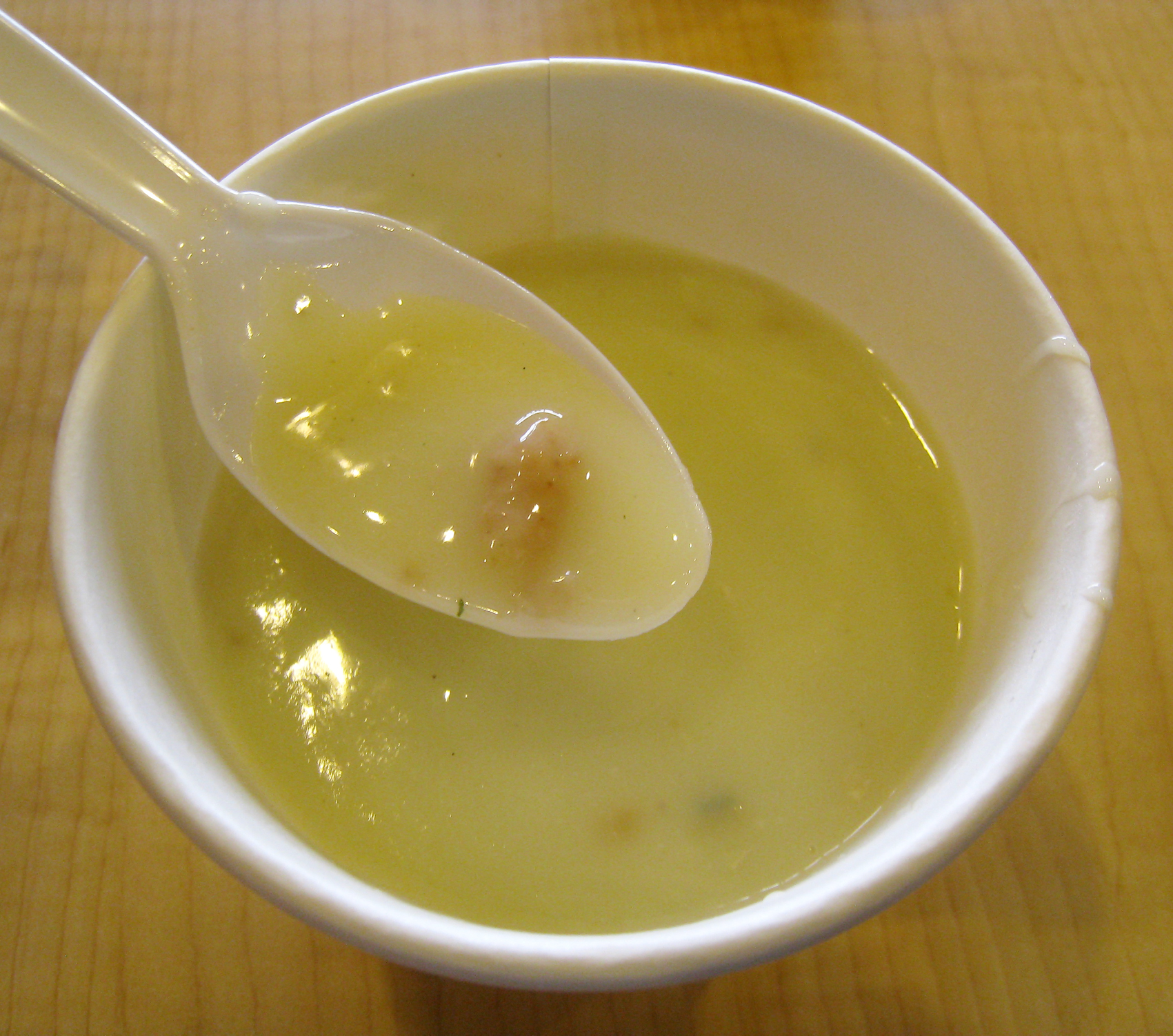
Sup krim ayam, Western-derived chicken cream soup.

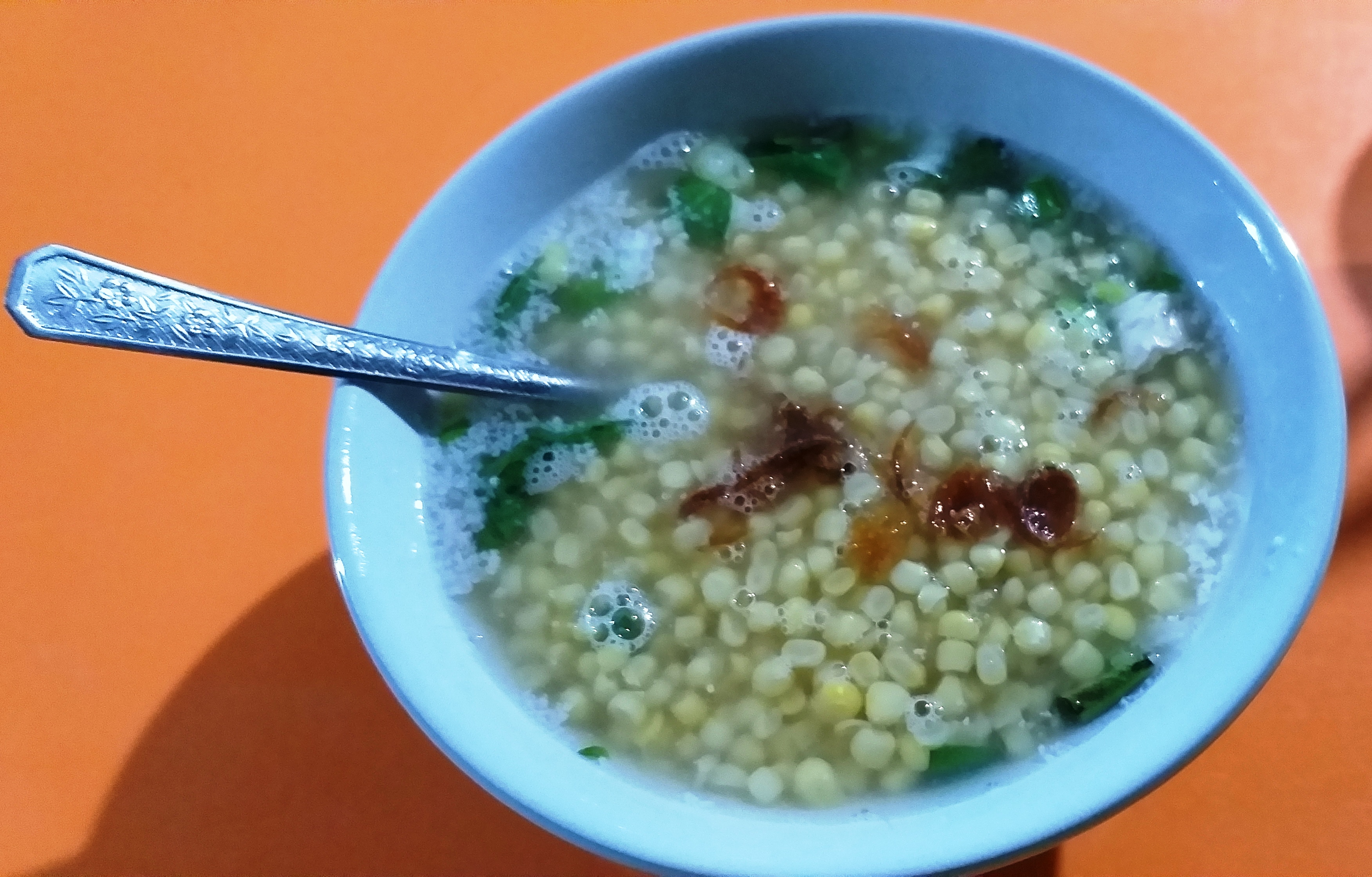
Binte biluhuta or sweet-corn soup from Gorontalo

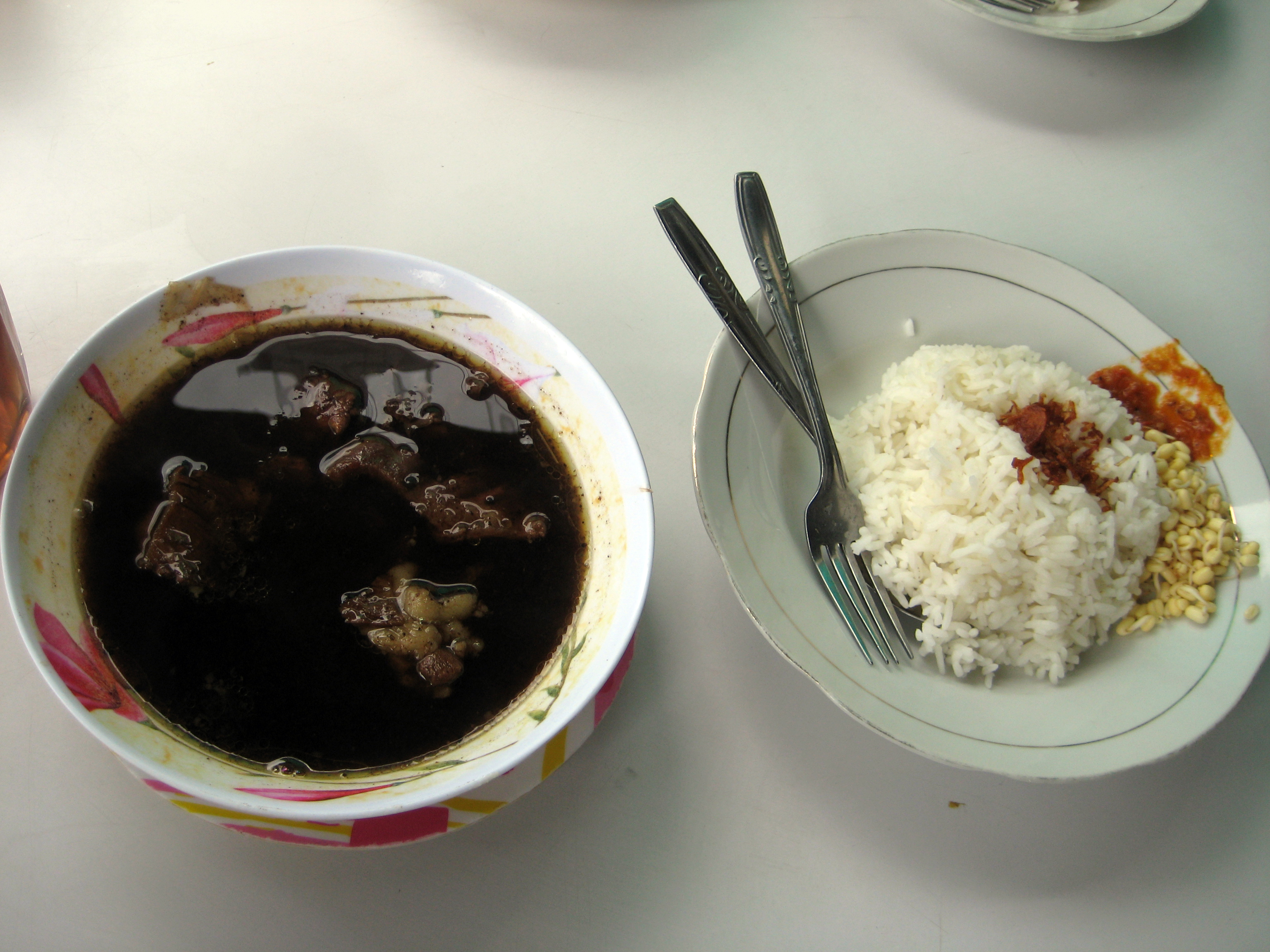
Rawon black soup (left), from Surabaya.

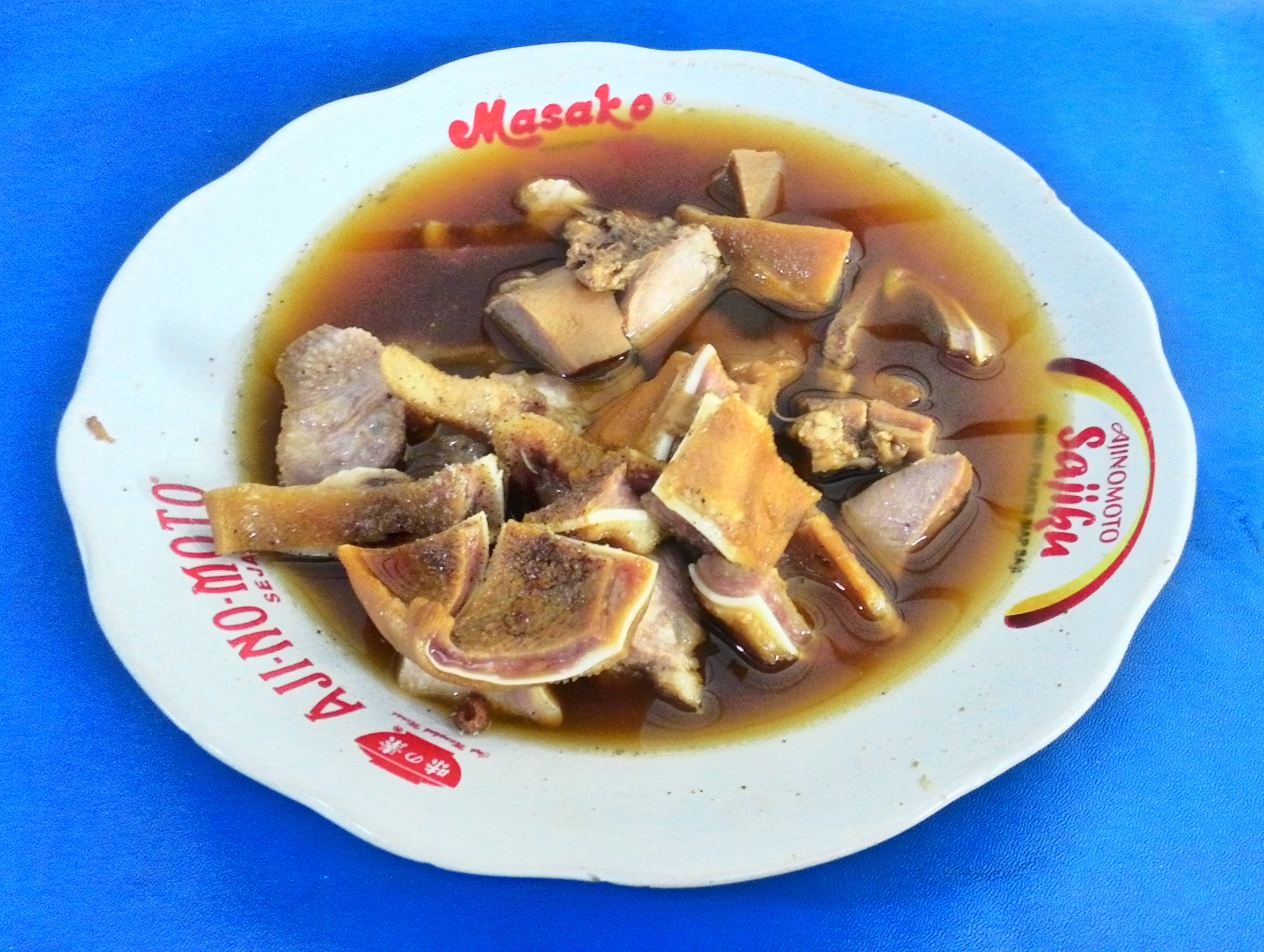
Sekba Chinese Indonesian pork offal soup.

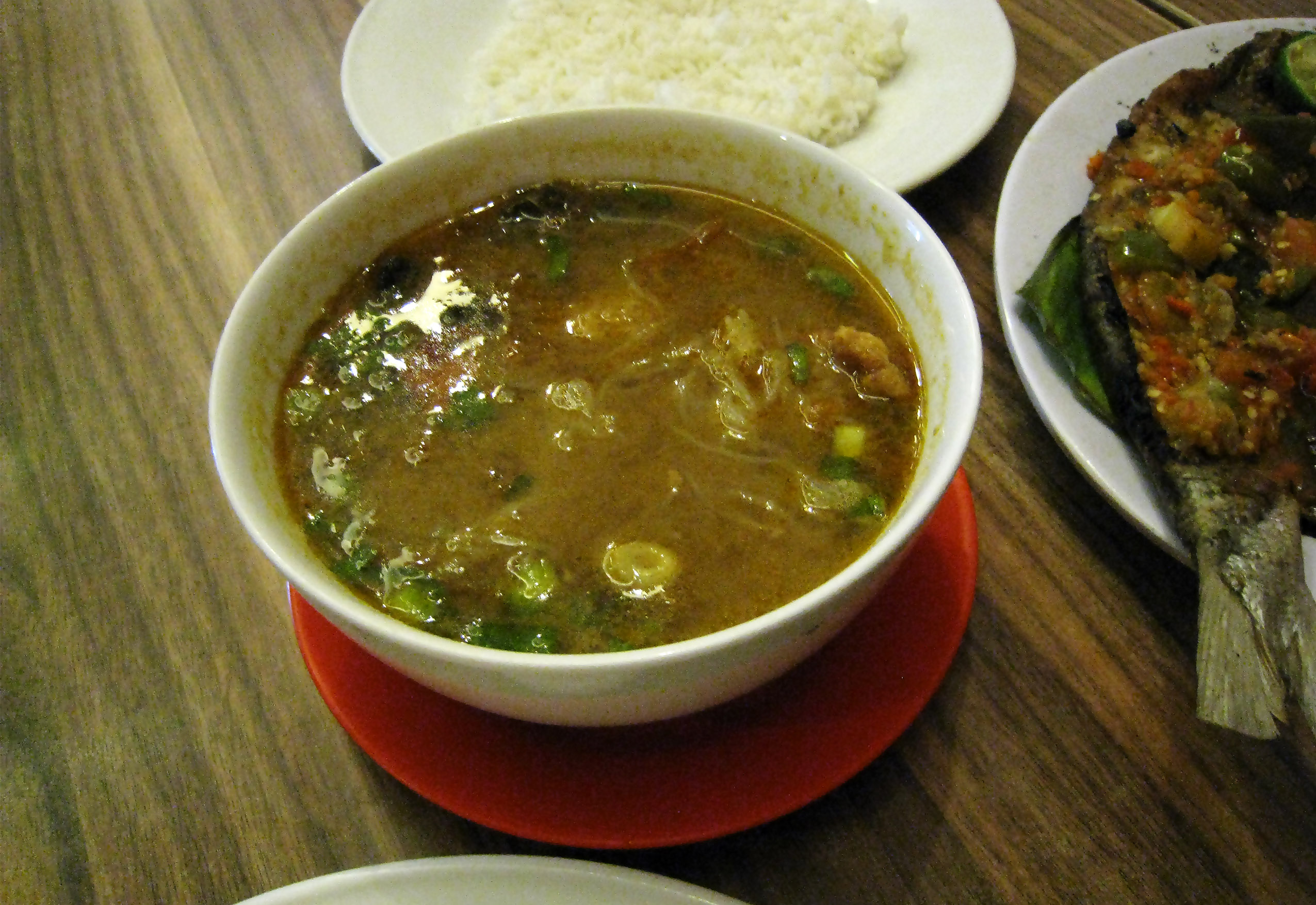
Sop saudara beef soup from Makassar.

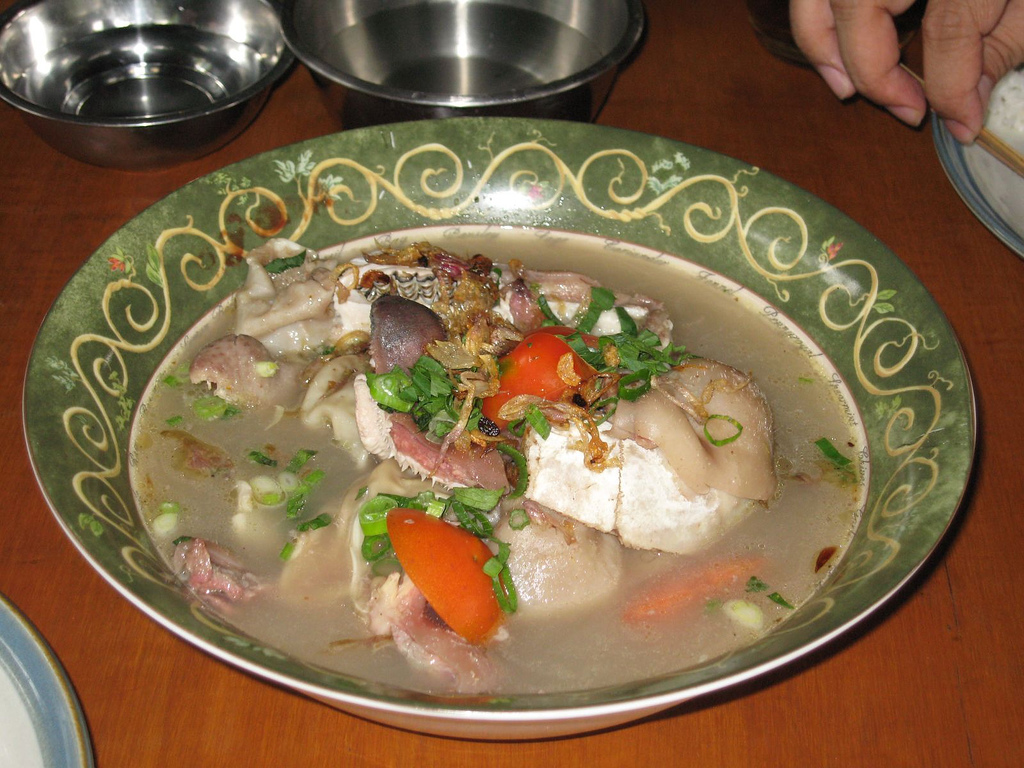
Sop kambing, goat meat soup.

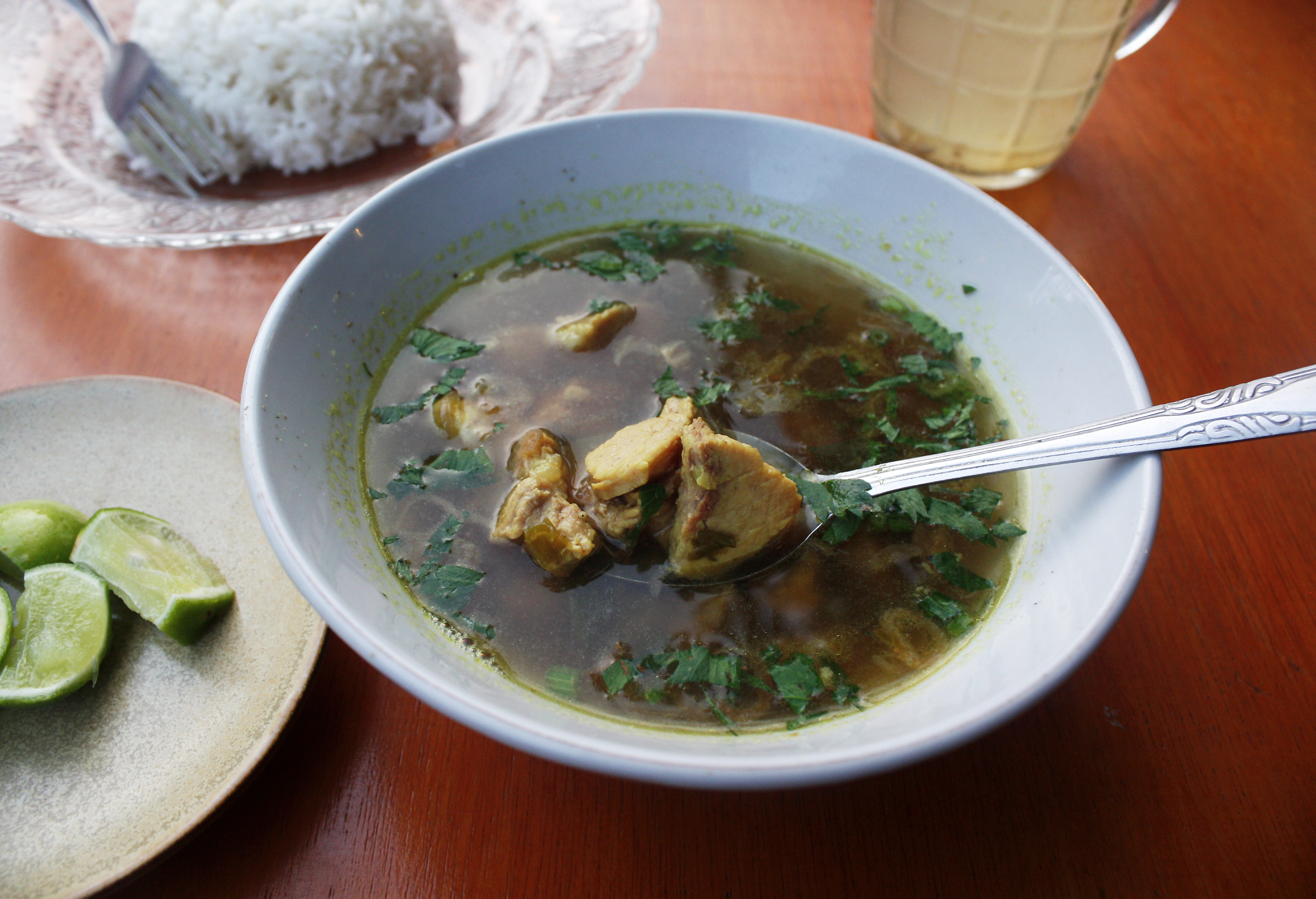
Balinese pork soto.

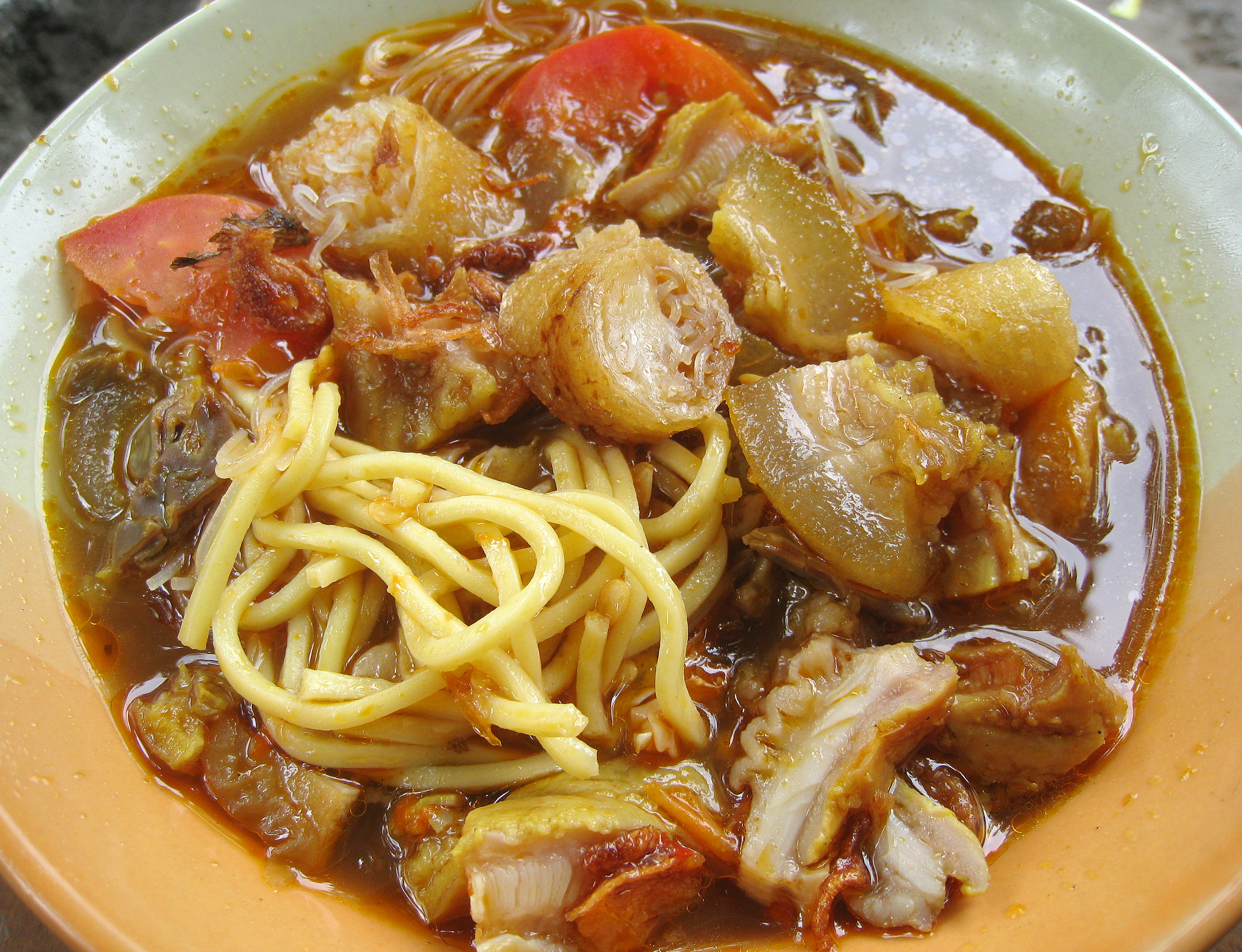
Soto mie from Bogor.

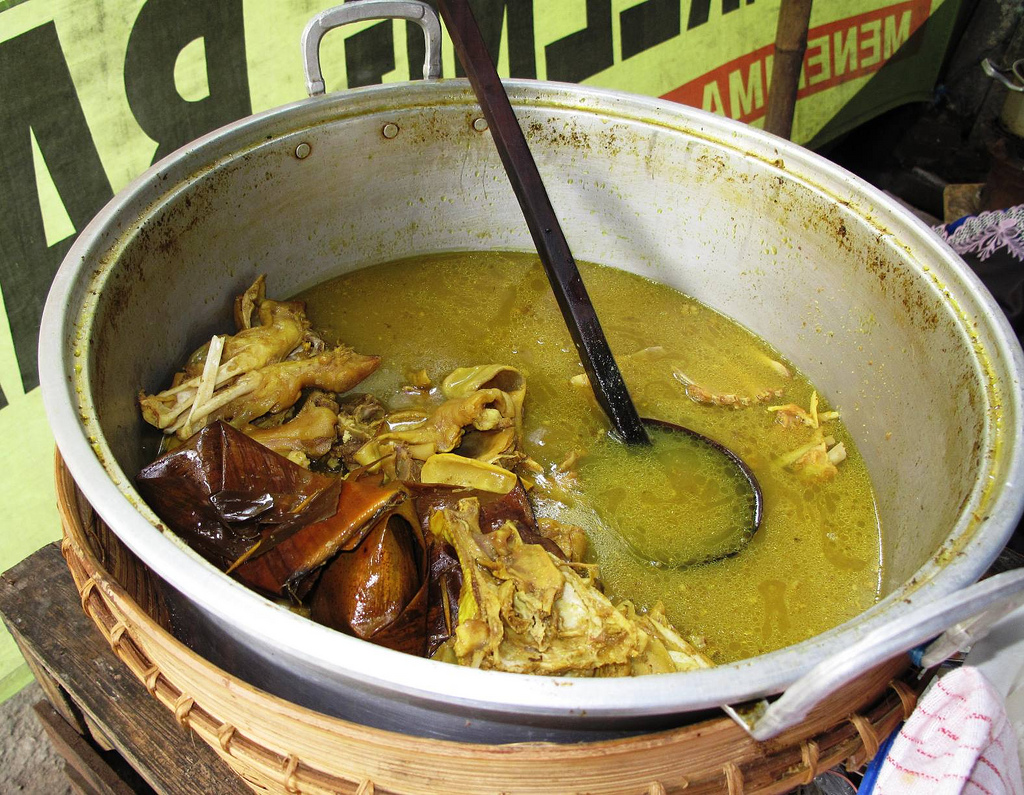
Tengkleng, a mutton soup of Solo.

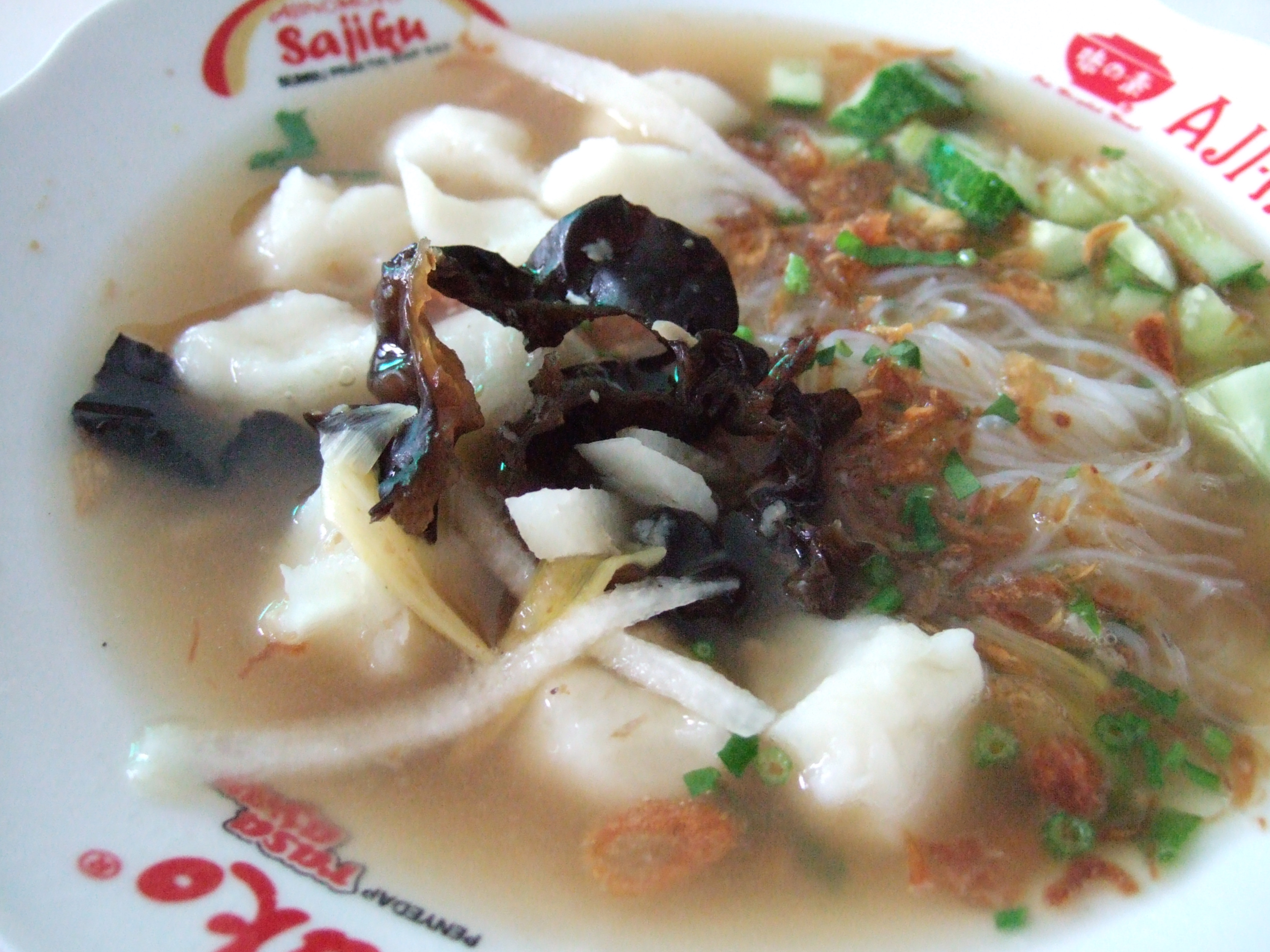
Tekwan from Palembang.

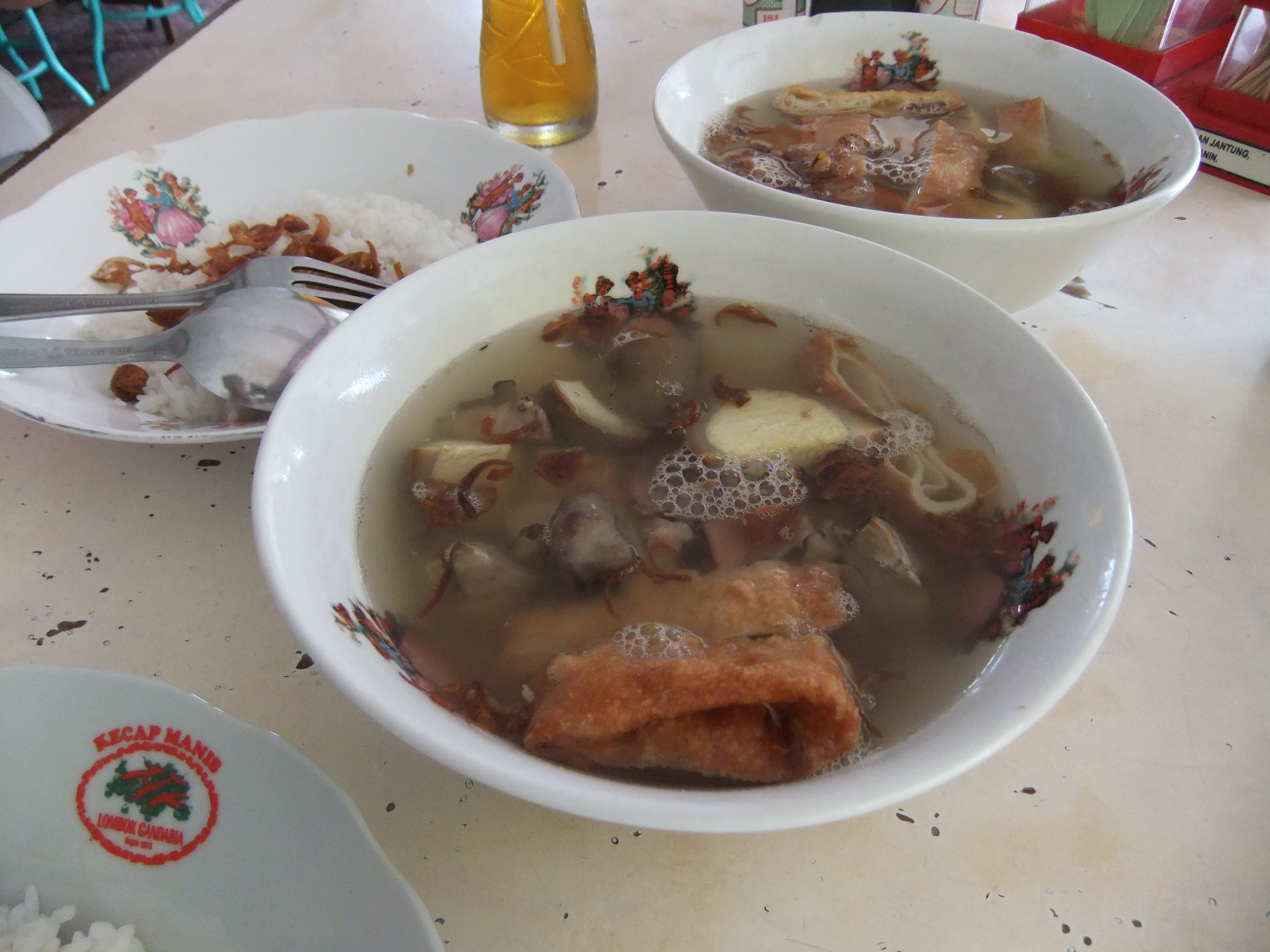
Timlo solo

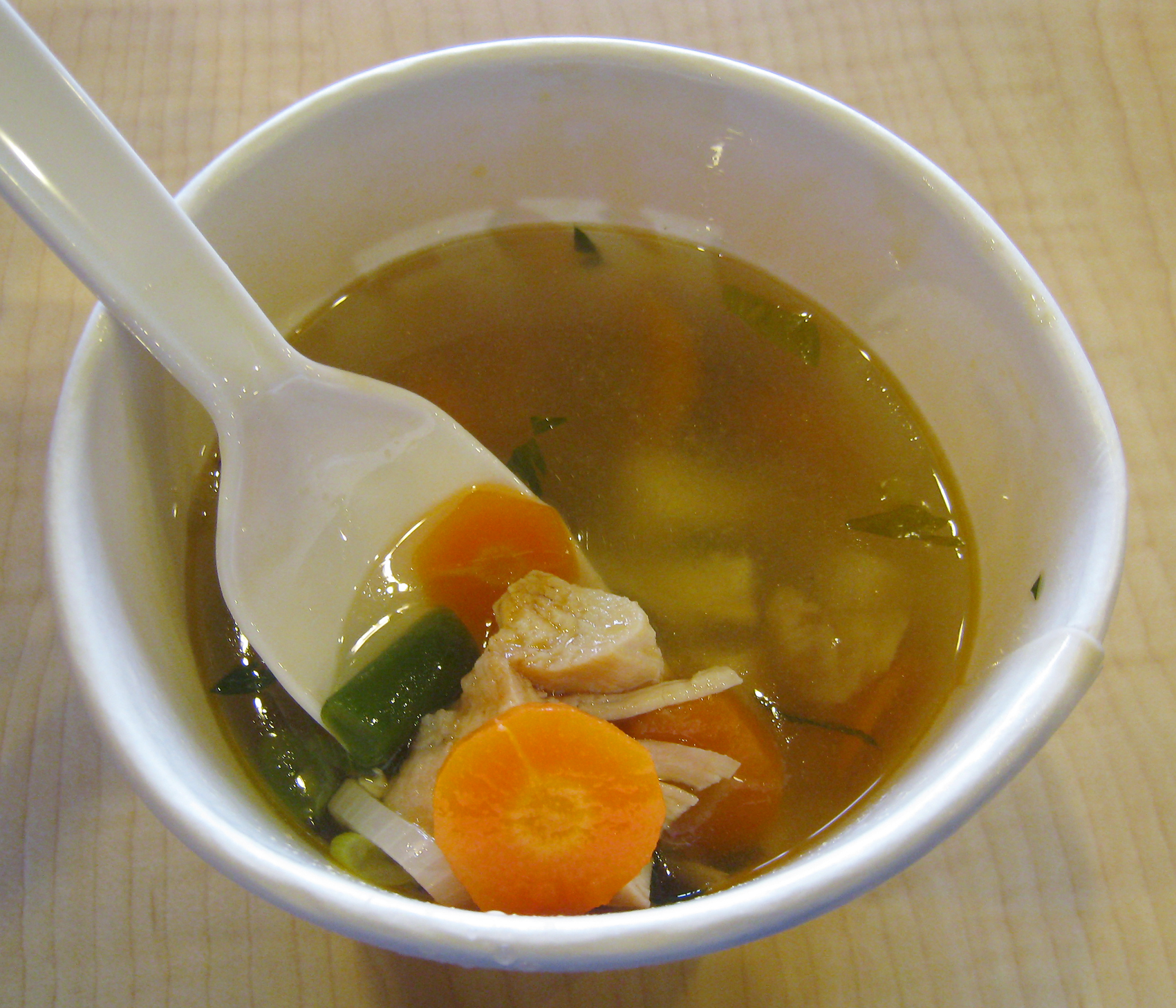
Sayur sop vegetables soup.

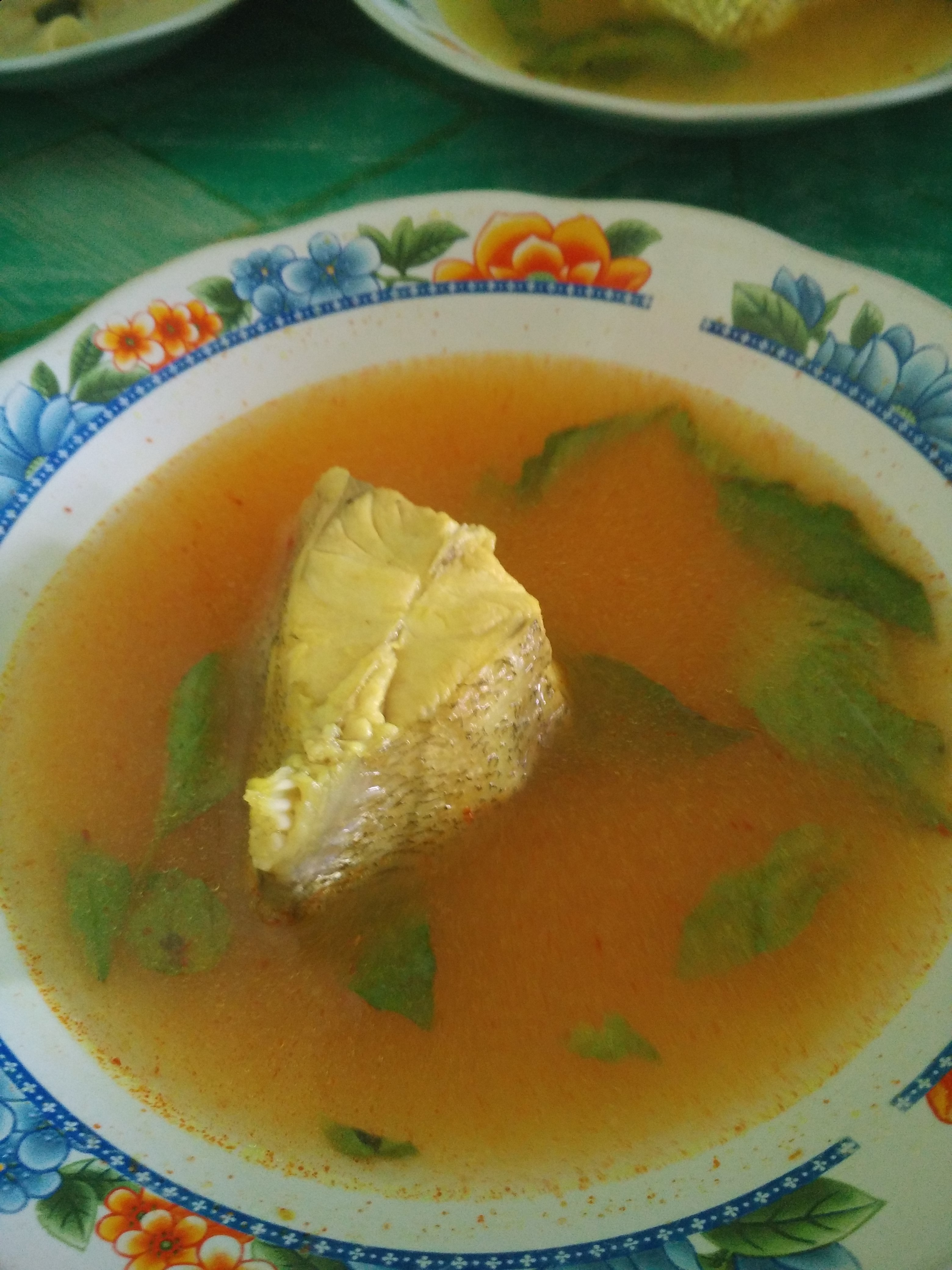
Ikan kuah kuning fish soup of Maluku and Papua.

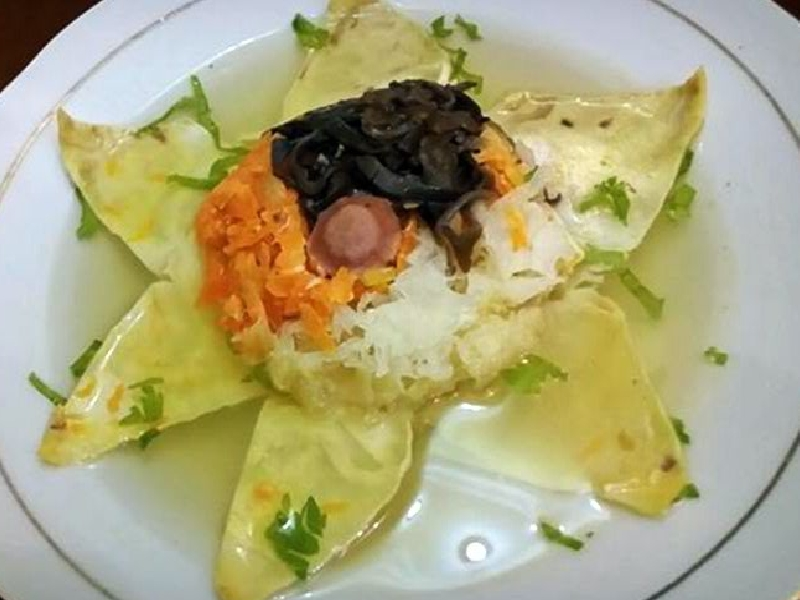
Sup Matahari, literally means soup of the sun from Solo.

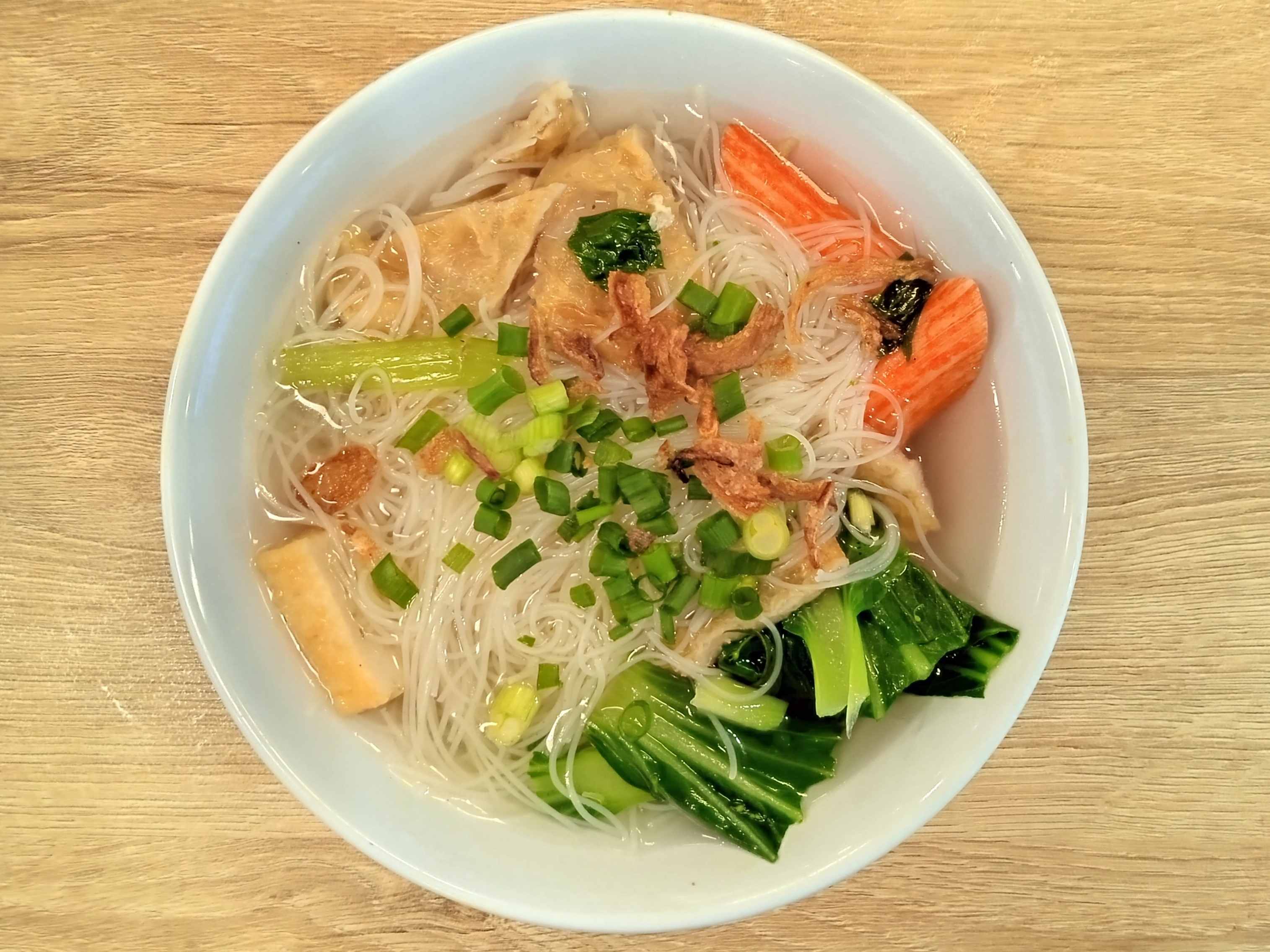
Bihun kuah

== Commercially prepared soups ==
Commercially prepared and packaged soups are also consumed in Indonesia, including those that are frozen, canned and dehydrated. In 2013, commercially prepared soups had a value growth of 14% in Indonesia. In 2013 the company Supra Sumber Cipta held its leadership in this food category, with a 32% value share in Indonesia.

== See also ==
- Cuisine of Indonesia
- Javanese cuisine
- List of Indonesian beverages
- List of Indonesian condiments
- List of Indonesian dishes
- List of soups
- List of stews
