= Sayur lodeh =

Indonesian vegetable soup dish

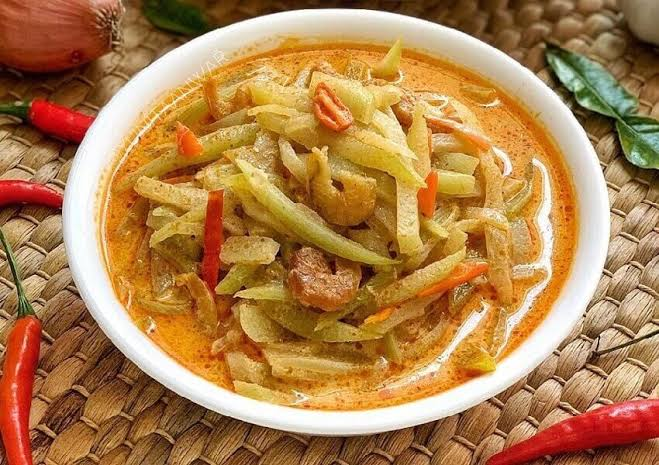
- Indonesian mixed-vegetable soup dish with coconut milk
- Type: Soup
- Course: Main
- Place of origin: Indonesia
- Region or state: Central and east part of Java
- Created by: Javanese
- Serving temperature: Hot or room temperature
- Main ingredients: Coconut milk, vegetables (jackfruit, eggplant, chayote, melinjo, long beans, tofu, tempeh), chicken or beef stock

Sayur lodeh is an Indonesian vegetable soup prepared from vegetables cooked in coconut milk, most often associated with Javanese cuisine.

== Ingredients ==
Common ingredients are young unripe jackfruit, eggplant, chayote, melinjo beans and leaves, long beans, green chili pepper, tofu and tempeh, cooked in coconut milk and sometimes enriched with chicken or beef stock. The bumbu spice mixture includes ground chili pepper (optional, depending on the desired degree of spiciness), shallot, garlic, candlenut, coriander, kencur powder, turmeric powder (optional), dried shrimp paste, salt and sugar. There are two main variants of sayur lodeh soup based on its colour: the white and yellow lodeh. The greenish white sayur lodeh is made without turmeric, while the golden yellow one has turmeric in it. Sometimes, green stink beans are added.

The ingredients of sayur lodeh are similar to sayur asem, with the main difference in its liquid portion; sayur lodeh is coconut milk-based while sayur asem is tamarind-based. In order to add aroma and taste, an authentic Javanese sayur lodeh recipe might include ground old tempeh. This old tempeh is known as "yesterday's tempeh" or "rotten tempeh" (Javanese: tempe bosok).

== Origin ==
The origin of the dish can be traced to the Javanese people's tradition of Java. According to Javanese Kejawen beliefs, sayur lodeh is an essential part of the slametan ceremony, and it is believed as tolak bala, to ward off possible danger and disaster. The people and the Keraton (court) of Yogyakarta often communally cook sayur lodeh for the slametan ceremony. It is believed this can deter disasters such as wind storm, earthquake, volcanic eruption, drought and plague. It is well known in Javanese cuisine and has spread throughout Indonesia and the region. Because of Javanese migration to neighboring countries, today sayur lodeh is also popular in Malaysia and Singapore.

== Serving ==
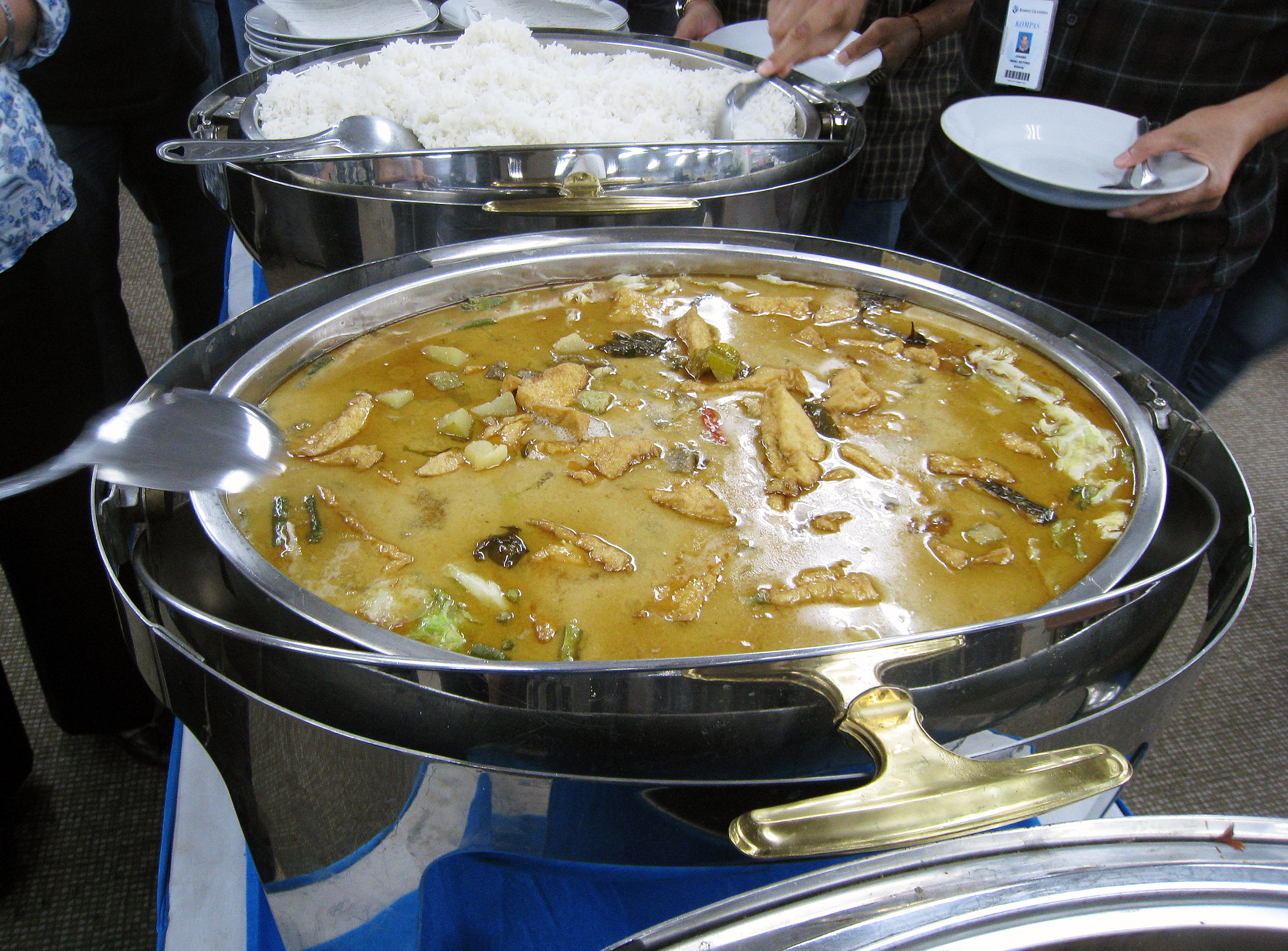
Golden sayur lodeh served in a buffet

Sayur lodeh can be served with steamed rice (separated or mixed in one plate), or with sliced rice cake, called lontong. This is typical for Singapore and Malaysia (nasi himpit). Dried squid sambal, boiled egg and coconut serunding are often added to lontong.

Although sayur lodeh is basically a vegetarian dish, it is commonly consumed with ikan asin (salted fish), opor ayam, empal gepuk or beef serundeng. Sambal terasi (shrimp paste chili sauce) is usually served separately.

== See also ==
- Coconut soup
- List of Indonesian soups
- List of vegetable soups
