= Sayur bayam =

Indonesian vegetable soup

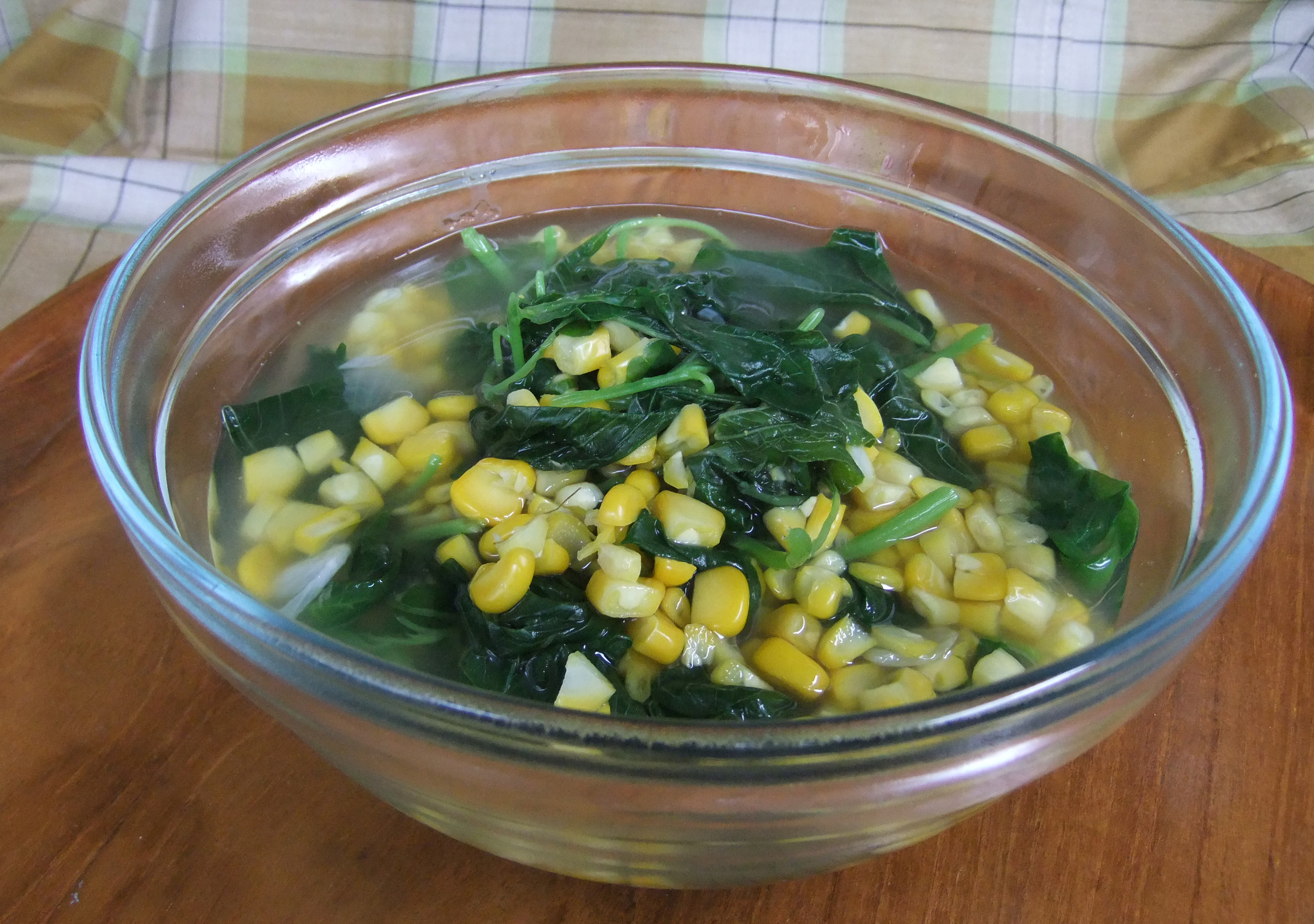
- A bowl of sayur bayam
- Alternative names: Sayur bening, sayur bayam bening
- Course: Main course (breakfast or lunch)
- Place of origin: Indonesia
- Region or state: Nationwide in Indonesia
- Created by: Indonesians
- Serving temperature: hot

Sayur bayam or sayur bening is an Indonesian vegetable soup prepared from vegetables, primarily amaranth, in clear soup flavoured with temu kunci. It is commonly prepared as a main course during breakfast or lunchtime.

== Ingredients ==
Sayur bayam is made up of amaranth, corn, and moringa in a clear soup flavoured with temu kunci, bay leaves, garlic, and shallots. Fried shallots can also be added to sayur bayam.

== See also ==
- Cuisine of Indonesia
- List of Indonesian soups
