= Soto ayam =

Indonesian chicken soup

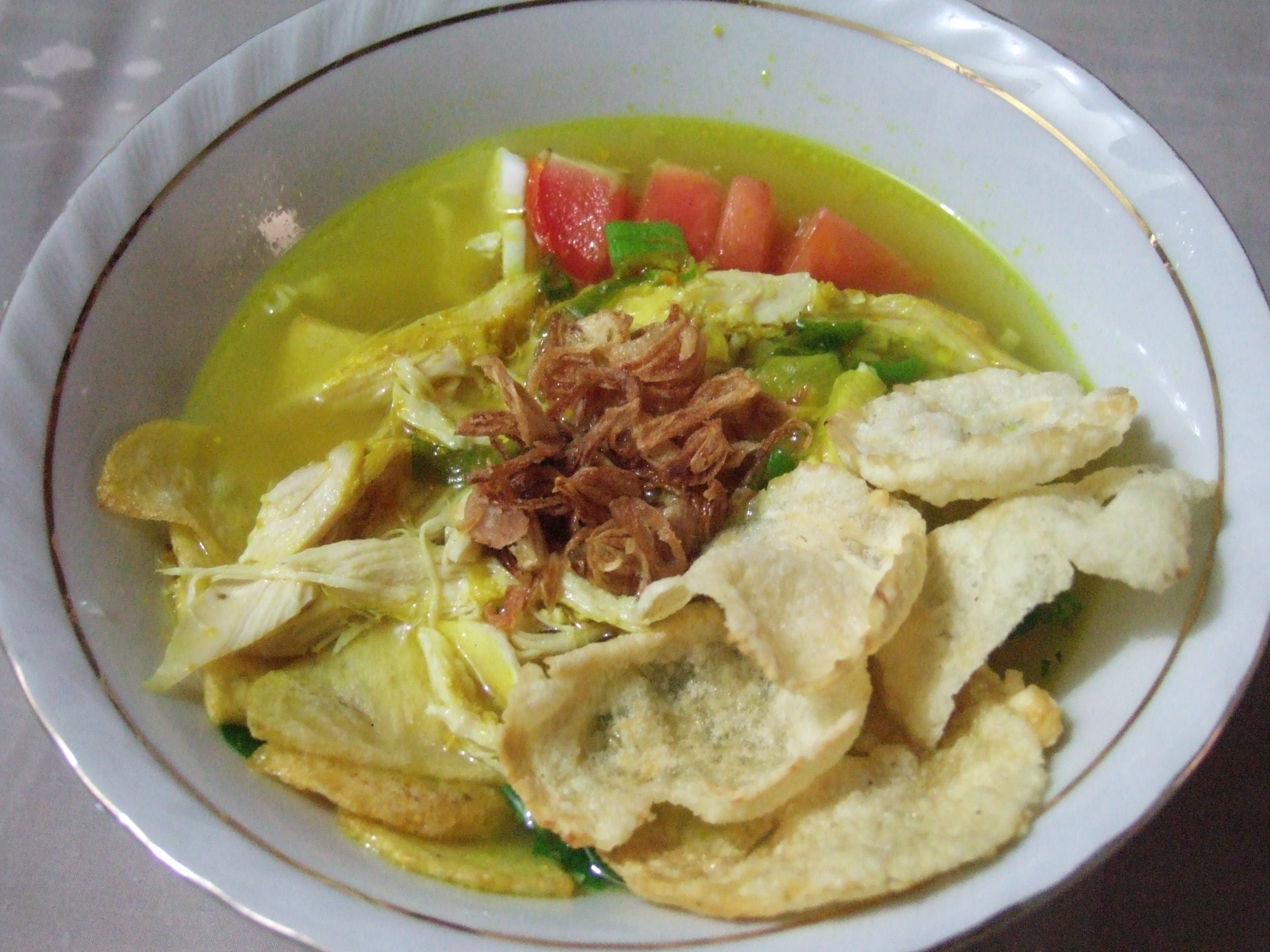
- Course: Main dish
- Place of origin: Indonesia
- Region or state: Java
- Associated cuisine: Indonesia, Singapore, Malaysia, and Suriname (known as saoto ayam)
- Serving temperature: Hot
- Main ingredients: Chicken in spicy light turmeric soup

Soto ayam is a traditional Indonesian dish with ingredients such as chicken, lontong, noodles, and rice vermicelli. Soto ayam is also popular in Singapore, Malaysia and Suriname, where it is made with slightly different ingredients and known as saoto. Turmeric is added as one of its main ingredients which makes the yellow chicken broth. It is one of the most popular variants of soto, a traditional soup commonly found in Indonesian cuisine. Besides chicken and vermicelli, it can also be served with hard-boiled eggs, slices of fried potatoes, and Chinese celery leaves. Fried shallots are usually added as a garnish. Coconut milk (santan) is also used as an additional ingredient. Koya, a powder of mixed prawn crackers with fried garlic, or sambal is a common topping. Krupuk or emping is also a common topping. Lalapan is usually served as a side dish.

== Variations ==
Different regions have their variation of this dish, for instance:

- Soto Ambengan, originated from Ambengan, Surabaya. Soto Ambengan is famous for its koya topping.
- Soto Banjar
- Soto Kudus
- Soto Medan
- Soto Lamongan
- Soto Lenthok
- Soto Semarang

== See also ==
- Soto (food)
- List of chicken dishes
- List of Indonesian soups
- List of soups
- Lontong
- Ketupat
- Noodle soup
