= Soto (food) =

Traditional Indonesian soup

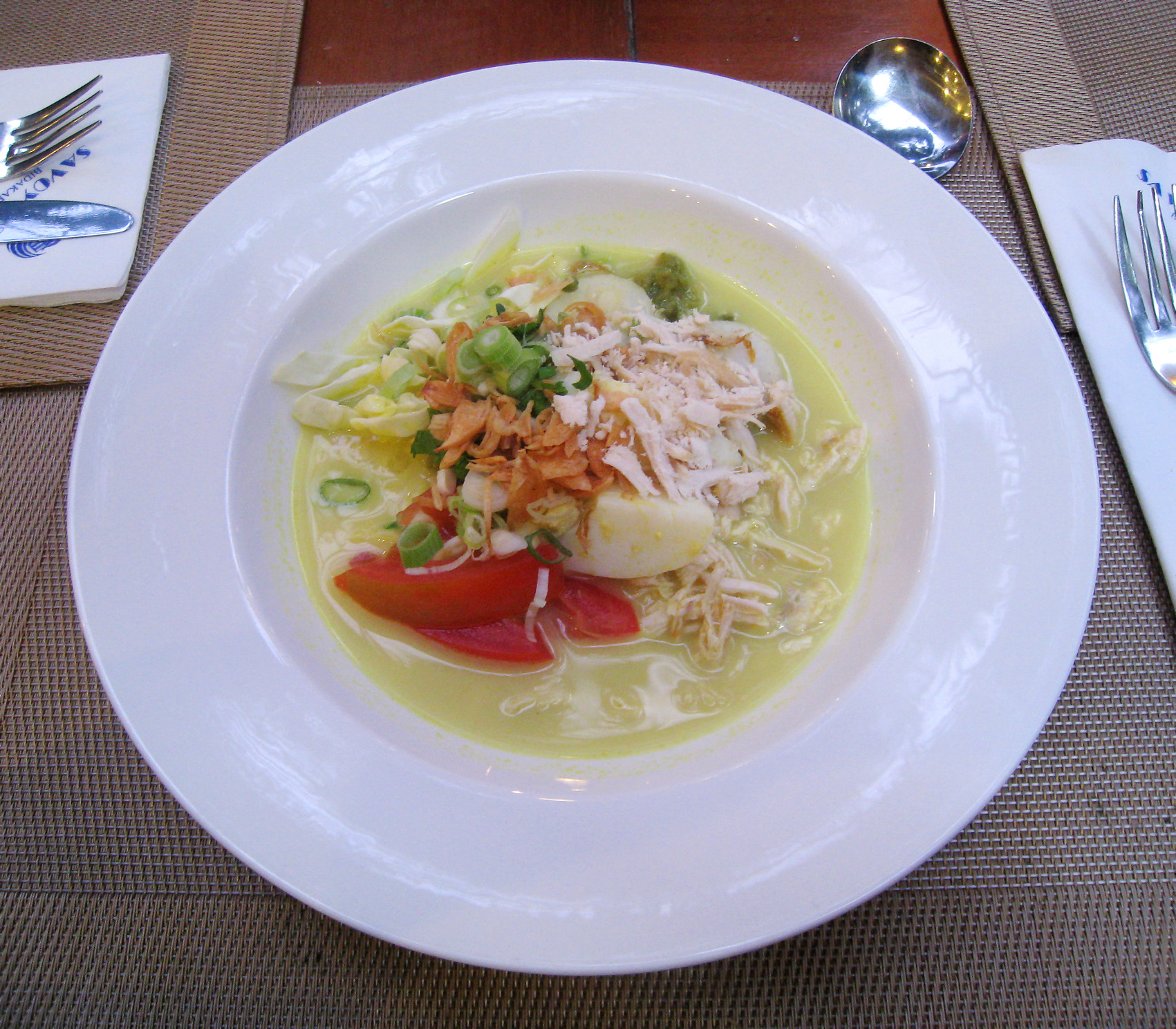
- Soto ayam, or chicken soto, with yellow coconut milk broth, slices of lontong, and fried shallot
- Alternative names: Sroto, coto, tauto
- Course: Main course
- Place of origin: Indonesia
- Region or state: Nationwide
- Associated cuisine: Indonesia, the Netherlands, Suriname (known as saoto)
- Serving temperature: Hot
- Main ingredients: Various traditional Indonesian chicken, beef, or offal soups
- Variations: Variations across Indonesia

Soto (also known as sroto, tauto, saoto, or coto) is a traditional Indonesian soup mainly composed of broth, meat (such as chicken), and vegetables. Many traditional soups are called soto, whereas foreign- and Western-influenced soups are called sop.

Soto is sometimes considered Indonesia's national dish, as it is served from Sumatra to Papua, in a wide range of variations. Soto is available everywhere from warungs and open-air eateries to fine-dining restaurants and luxurious hotels.

Due to the proximity and significant numbers of Indonesian migrants in neighbouring countries, soto can also be found in Singapore and Malaysia.

Introduced to Suriname by Javanese migrants, it is part of the national cuisine of that country as well, where it is spelled saoto.

== History ==
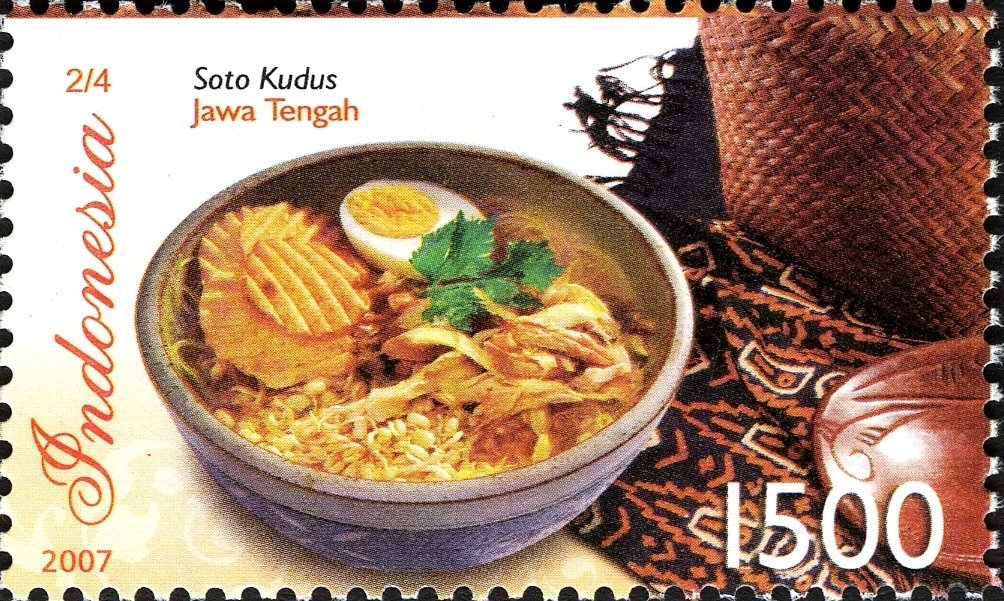
Indonesian 2007 stamp depicting Soto Kudus from Central Java

In the Indonesian archipelago, soto is known by different names. In the local Javanese dialect, it is called soto, and the dish also reached Makassar where it is called coto. Soto is found to be most prevalent in Java, and suggested that the hearty soup was originated from that island, and over the years this dish branched off in an assorted array of soto varieties.

Although soto was undoubtedly developed in the Indonesian archipelago and each region has developed its own distinctive soto recipes, some historians suggest that it was probably influenced by foreign culinary tradition, especially Hokkien Chinese or Stoof (Dutch for stew). Denys Lombard in his book Le Carrefour Javanais suggested that the origin of soto was a Hokkien Chinese soup, caudo (Chinese: 牛草肚; Pe̍h-ōe-jī: gû-chháu-tō͘; lit. 'beef tripe'), popular in Semarang among Chinese immigrants during colonial VOC era, circa 17th century.

Another scholar suggests that it was more likely a mixture of cooking traditions in the region, namely Chinese, Indian, and native Indonesian cuisine. There are traces of Chinese influence such as the use of bihun (rice vermicelli) and the preference for fried garlic as a condiment, while the use of turmeric suggests Indian influence. Another example is soto betawi from Jakarta uses minyak samin (ghee), which indicates Arab or Muslim Indian influences. Another historian suggest that some soto recipe reflects the past condition of its people. Soto tangkar, which today is a meat soup, was mostly made from the broth of goat rib-cage bones (Betawi: tangkar) in the past because meat was expensive, or the common population of Batavia were too poor to afford some meat back then. Soto recipes has been highly localized according to local tradition and available ingredients, for example in Hindu-majority island of Bali, soto babi (pork soto) can be found, since Hindu Balinese prefer pork while beef is seldom consumed, they also do not share Indonesian Muslim halal dietary law that forbids the consumption of pork.

The meat soup dish influenced various regions and each developed its own recipes, with the ingredients being highly localized according to available ingredients and local cooking traditions. As a result, rich variants of soto were developed across Indonesia.

In 2018, soto was officially recognised by the Indonesian government as one of the country's five national dishes: the others are nasi goreng, sate, rendang, and gado-gado. Also in 2018, soto is promoted in Asian Festival in Gelora Bung Karno Sports Complex during 2018 Asian Games in Jakarta as a dish that represent the diversity of Indonesia. With the theme "Unity in Diversoto" presented in the food court, visitors had the opportunity to samples various regional sotos of Indonesia, thus it has become visitors' favourite in Asian Festival during 2018 Asian Games.

== Varieties ==
The spread of soto in Indonesian archipelago was followed by the localization of Soto's recipe, according to available ingredients and distinctive local taste. As the result, myriad soto recipes and variations can be found throughout Indonesia.

=== By regions ===
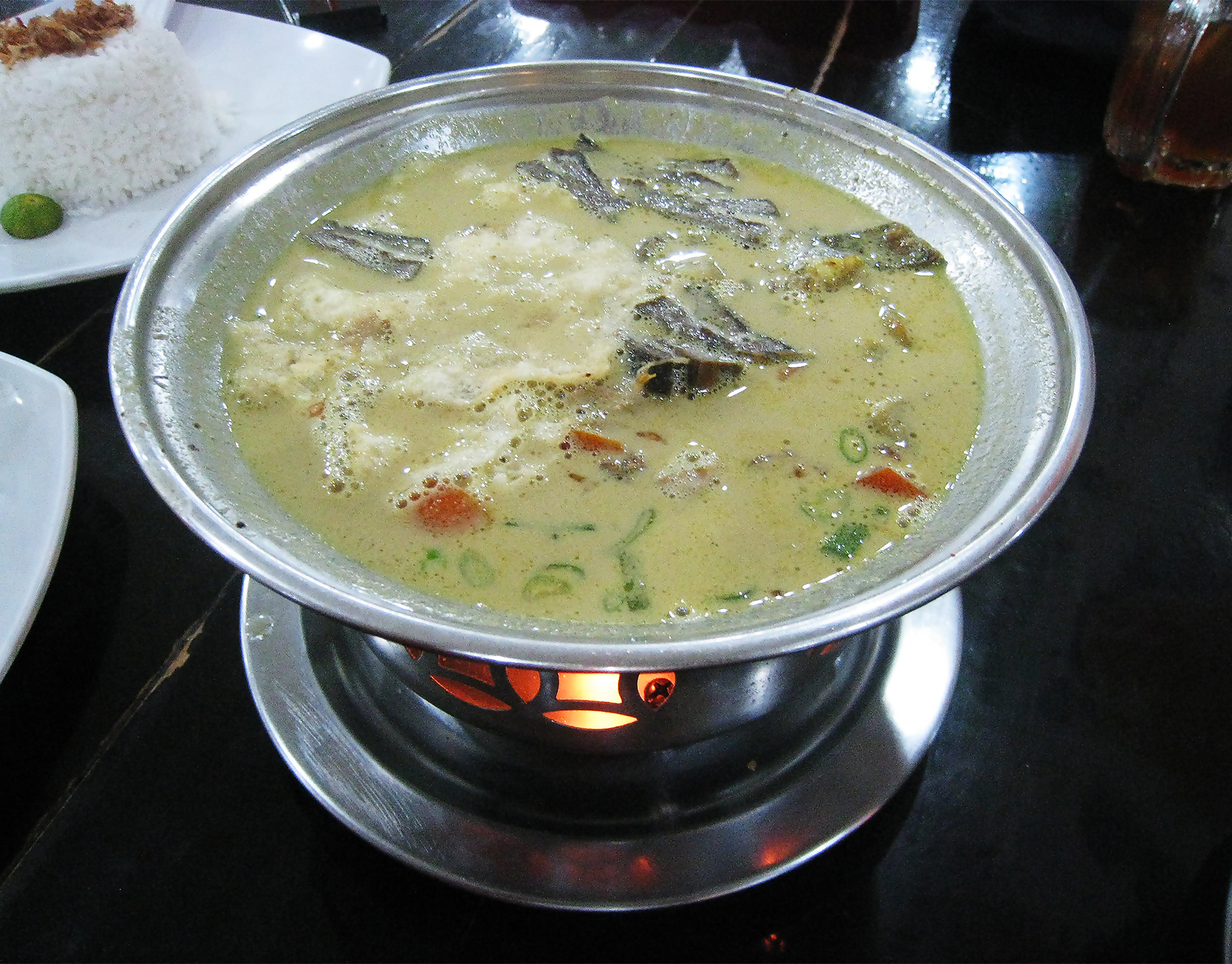
Soto Betawi, mainly consisting of offal in creamy milk or coconut milk soup, from Jakarta

Some sotos are named based on the town or region where they are created:

- Soto Bandung – a clear beef soto that has pieces of meat, white radish, and fried soybeans.
- Soto Bangkalan or soto mera – a soto with red colour broth. It consists of beef and the intestine, and fried peanuts. It is served with slices of lontong rice cake, sprinkled with scallions and fried shallots.
- Soto Banjar – spiced with star anise, clove, cassia and lemongrass, and sour hot sambal, served with potato cakes.
- Soto Banjarnegara or soto Krandegan – a beef soto in a yellow coconut milk soup and eaten with ketupat.
- Soto Banyumas, sroto Banyumas or sroto Sokaraja – made special by its peanut sambal, usually eaten with ketupat.
- Soto Banyuwangi or rujak soto – a beef soto with beef tripe, vegetables, peanut sauce, and beef broth.
- Soto Betawi – made of beef or beef offal, cooked in a cow milk or coconut milk broth, with fried potato and tomato.
- Soto Blora, or soto klethuk – there are shredded chicken, bean sprouts, vermicelli, eggs, fried onions, and the most important thing is klethuk (cassava cut into small squares, then fried until really crisp and golden brown in color)
- Soto Bogor known as soto kuning – a beef soto served with additional tomato slices, fried potato, emping crackers, sambal, and lime juice. The beef in soto may be replaced with ayam goreng.
- Soto Boyolali or soto seger – a beef or chicken soto with clear soup and various side dishes.
- Soto Gombong – a chicken soto with gethuk.
- Soto Kediri – a chicken soto in coconut milk.
- Soto Kudus – made with chicken or water buffalo meat due to local taboos of the consumption of beef.
- Soto Lamongan – a popular street food in various Indonesian metropolitan areas, a variation of the Madura soto. The dish uses koya as a condiment that is made from finely ground prawn crackers.
- Soto Madura or soto Sulung/soto Ambengan – made with either chicken, beef or offal, in a yellowish transparent broth.
- Soto Makassar or coto Makassar – a beef and offal soto boiled in water used to wash rice, with fried peanut.
- Soto Medan – a chicken/pork/beef/prawn/innards soto with added coconut milk and served with potato croquette (perkedel). The meat pieces are fried before being served or mixed. The spice is similar to soto Betawi with addition of cardamom.
- Soto Pacitan – chicken soto in light spicy soup, served with beansprouts, rice vermicelli, cabbages, celery, fried shallot, and fried peanuts.
- Soto Padang – a beef broth soto with slices of fried beef, bihun (rice vermicelli), and perkedel kentang (fried mashed potato).
- Soto Pangandaran – a soto made of chicken, peanut, bean sprouts, tomato, and red color krupuk.
- Soto Pangkalan Bun or coto manggala – a chicken soto mixed with cassava.
- Soto Pati or soto kemiri – free-range chicken soto with coconut milk soup and candlenut spices.
- Soto Pekalongan or tauto Pekalongan – spiced with tauco (a fermented miso-like bean paste).
- Soto Petanahan or soto kored in Kebumen Regency – a chicken soto made of ketupat, free-range chicken, bean sprouts, and peanut-based soup.
- Soto Semarang – a chicken soto spiced with candlenut, mixed with rice, perkedel, tempe, and often eaten with sate kerang (cockles on a stick) or tripes and quail eggs. One of the pioneers of Soto Semarang is Soto Bangkong, named after Bangkong crossroad in Semarang.
- Soto Solo also known as soto kwali – in Javanese and Indonesian language kwali or kuali means "cauldron". This beef brisket soto in clear beef broth soup served with beansprouts, celery and bawang goreng.
- Soto Sumedang or soto bongko – a soto consists of bongko (rice cake), tofu, chayote, and bean sprouts in a coconut milk soup.
- Soto Tamanwinangun in Kebumen Regency – a duck soto in peanut-based broth.
- Soto Tegal or Sauto Tegal – almost same with Pekalongan soto spiced with tauco (a fermented miso-like bean paste). Sauto can be chicken soto, beef soto, or even beef offal.
- Soto Ungaran or soto gudangan Ungaran – a beef soto rice with veggies and grated coconut.

=== By primary ingredient ===
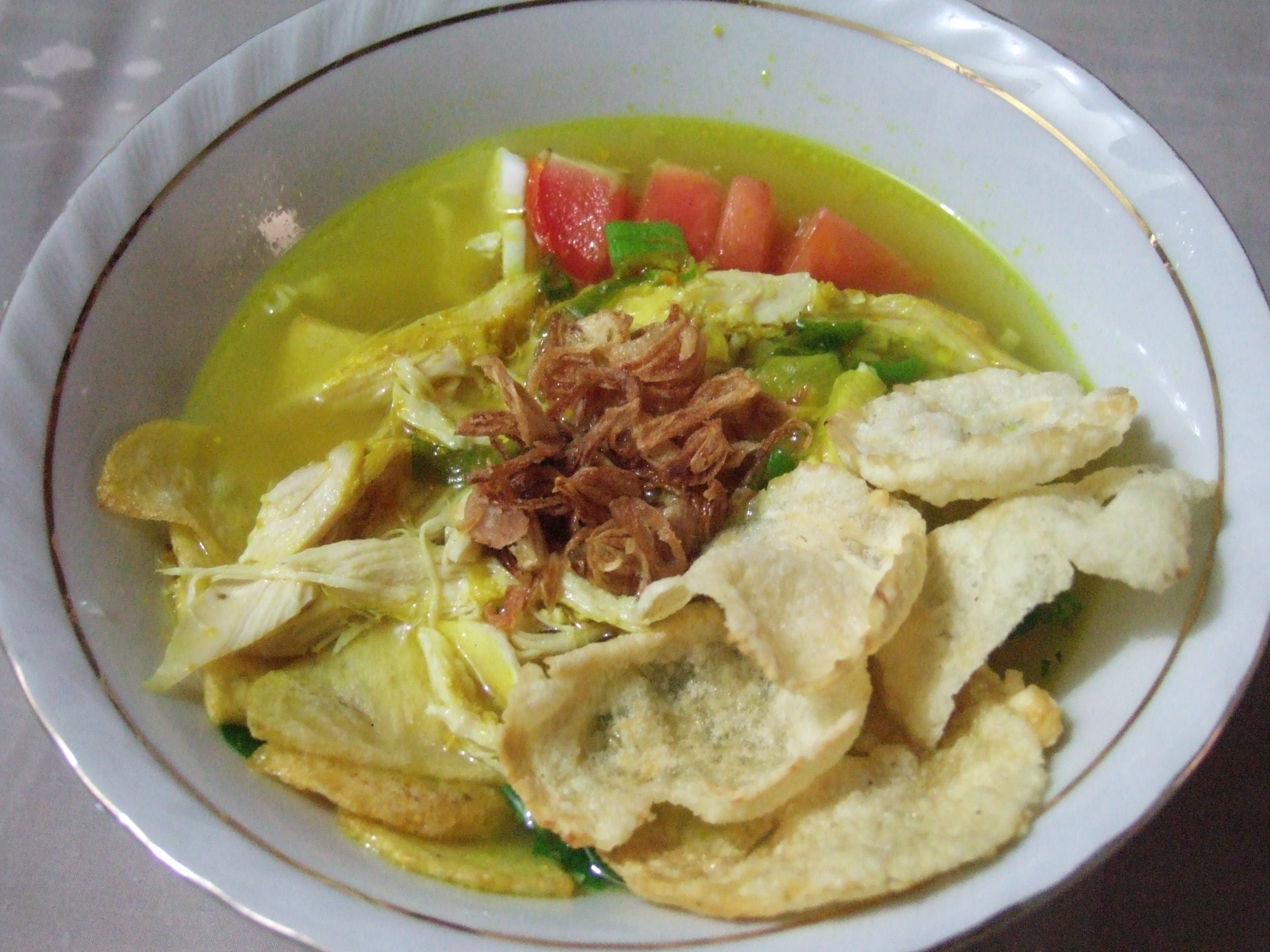
Soto ayam with clear yellow broth, garnished with emping crackers and fried shallot

Other sotos are named based upon their chief ingredient:

- Soto ayam – chicken in a yellow spicy broth with lontong, nasi empit, ketupat (rice compressed by cooking wrapped tightly in a leaf, then sliced into small cakes), or vermicelli, commonly found in Indonesia, Singapore, and Malaysia. Some versions are prepared with cellophane noodles., boiled eggs, lime juice and beansprouts
- Soto babat – a cow's or goat's tripe, served in yellow spicy coconut milk soup with vermicelli, potato, and vegetables, usually eaten with rice. It is commonly found throughout Indonesia.
- Soto babi – a pork soto from Hindu majority Bali island.
- Soto bayem/bayam – a spinach soto doused with sambel kacang, and beef soup. It is a delicacy of Semarang.
- Soto bebek – a duck soto, specialty of Klaten, Central Java.
- Soto buntut – beef oxtail soto in Surabaya, East Java.
- Soto ceker – a chicken foot soto, served in rather clear yellowish spicy broth soup, which uses spices including shallot, garlic, lemongrass, and turmeric that add the yellowish colour, served with of cabbage, celery, rice noodles, and garnished to taste with sambal, lime and soy. Soto ceker is one of the popular street food in Jakarta, Bali, and most of major cities in Java. In street side warung or humble restaurants, soto ceker is usually offered as a variation of soto ayam.
- Soto garing – a soto served without broth. As a substitute for broth, this soto is doused with soy sauce. This soto can be found in Klaten, Central Java.
- Soto kaki (lit. 'foot soto') – made of beef cow's trotters; tendon and cartilage taken from cow's feet, served in yellow spicy coconut milk soup with vermicelli, potato, vegetables, and krupuk, commonly eaten with rice. It is a Betawi food and can be found in Jakarta, Indonesia.
- Soto kambing – goat meat soto, a common dish in Randudongkal district of Pemalang Regency.
- Soto kemangi – lemon basil soto.
- Soto kerbau – made of water buffalo meat instead of beef, specialty of Kudus regency, Central Java.
- Soto kikil – cow's skin soto, can be found in several areas in East Java such as Gresik and Situbondo.
- Soto lenthok – a specialty of Yogyakarta which is chicken soto served with lenthok or fried mashed cassava akin to potato perkedel.
- Soto mi (spelled mee soto in Singapore and Malaysia) – a yellow spicy beef or chicken broth soup with noodles, commonly found in Indonesia, Singapore, and Malaysia. Bogor, Indonesia, is famous for its soto mi made with beef broth, kikil (cow's cartilage), noodles, and sliced risoles spring rolls.
- Soto ranjau or also known as soto tulang – chicken soto served with its bones. Ranjau in Indonesian means landmine, which actually refer to chicken bones. Usually soto are served with shredded boneless chicken meat. Soto ranjau however, is served as soup of chicken bones with some pieces of remaining meats, cartilage and skin.
- Soto sapi or called soto daging – beef soto.
- Soto tahu – tofu soto, a dish from Yogyakarta.
- Soto tangkar – also Betawi specialty soto made of chopped goat or beef ribs (Betawi:tangkar) and beef brisket cooked in coconut milk soup spiced with turmeric, garlic, shallot, chili, pepper, candlenut, cumin, galangal, coriander, cinnamon, Indonesian bay leaf (daun salam), and kaffir lime leaf.
- Soto udang – use shrimps and coconut milk soup.

== Accompaniments ==
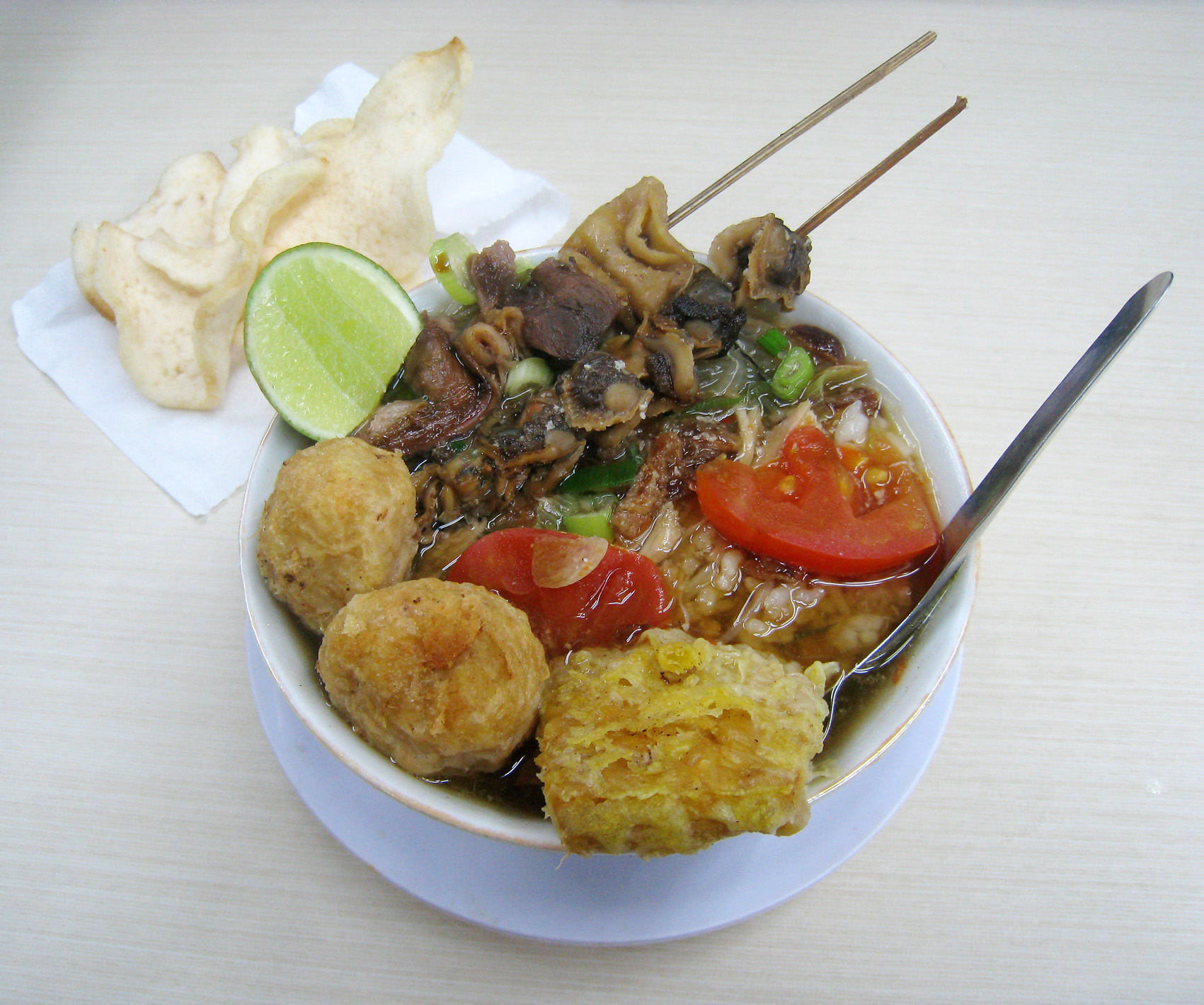
Soto Semarang from Semarang, chicken soto with cockles and tripes satay, fried tempeh, and perkedel

The following accompaniments are often eaten alongside soto:

- Stewed quail eggs or chicken eggs
- Cockles on a stick (sate kerang)
- Skewered grilled tripes (sate babat)
- Skewered grilled chicken giblets, such as intestine, gizzard, and liver satay (sate ati ampela dan usus)
- Fried chicken giblets
- Prawn crackers, sometimes crushed and mixed with crushed fried garlic as koya in Madura or Lamongan soto
- Gnetum seed crackers (emping)
- Fried tofu or tempeh
- Mashed potato patties (perkedel)
- Mung bean sprouts (tauge/kecambah)
- Hot chili sauce (sambal)
- Sweet soy sauce
- Fried shallot (bawang goreng)
- Spicy fried grated coconut (serundeng)
- Crackers (krupuk)
- Lime juice, sometimes replaced with vinegar
- Potato chips (Keripik kentang)
- Cabbage

== Ingredients ==
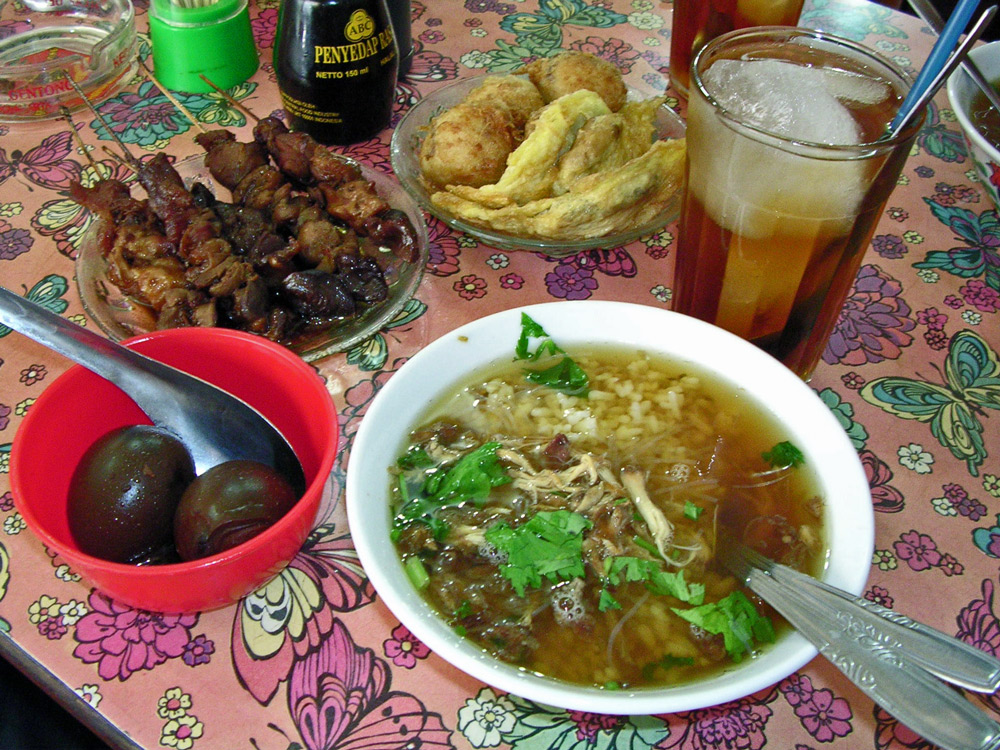
Chicken soto with eggs and tripes satay

The meats that are most commonly used are chicken and beef, but there are also variations with offal, mutton, and water buffalo meat. Pork is seldom used in traditional Indonesian soto; however, in Hindu majority Bali, soto babi (pork soto) can be found. The soup is usually accompanied by rice or compressed rice cakes (lontong, ketupat or burasa). Offal is considered as a delicacy: the rumen (blanket/flat/smooth tripe), reticulum (honeycomb and pocket tripe), omasum (book/bible/leaf tripe), and the intestines are all eaten.

Other ingredients of soto include soun alternatively spelled as sohun or bihun (rice vermicelli), mung bean sprouts and scallion. Common soto spices include shallots, garlic, turmeric, galangal, ginger, coriander, salt, candlenut, and pepper.

The colour, thickness and consistency of soto soup could vary according to each recipes. Soto can have a light and clear broth just like soto bandung, a yellow transparent broth (coloured with turmeric) like the one that can be found in soto ayam, or a rich and thick coconut milk or milk broth just like those in soto kaki or soto betawi.

Soto in Malaysia and Singapore has a certain expected clear-soup look made of chicken broth, with spicy taste mixed with rice cubes. It seems that soto served there derived from common soto ayam type with a clear and slightly yellow-coloured broth, pretty much similar to East Javanese soto lamongan or soto madura. Like many dishes, it may have been brought into the country by the many Javanese migrants in the early 20th century.

== Gallery ==
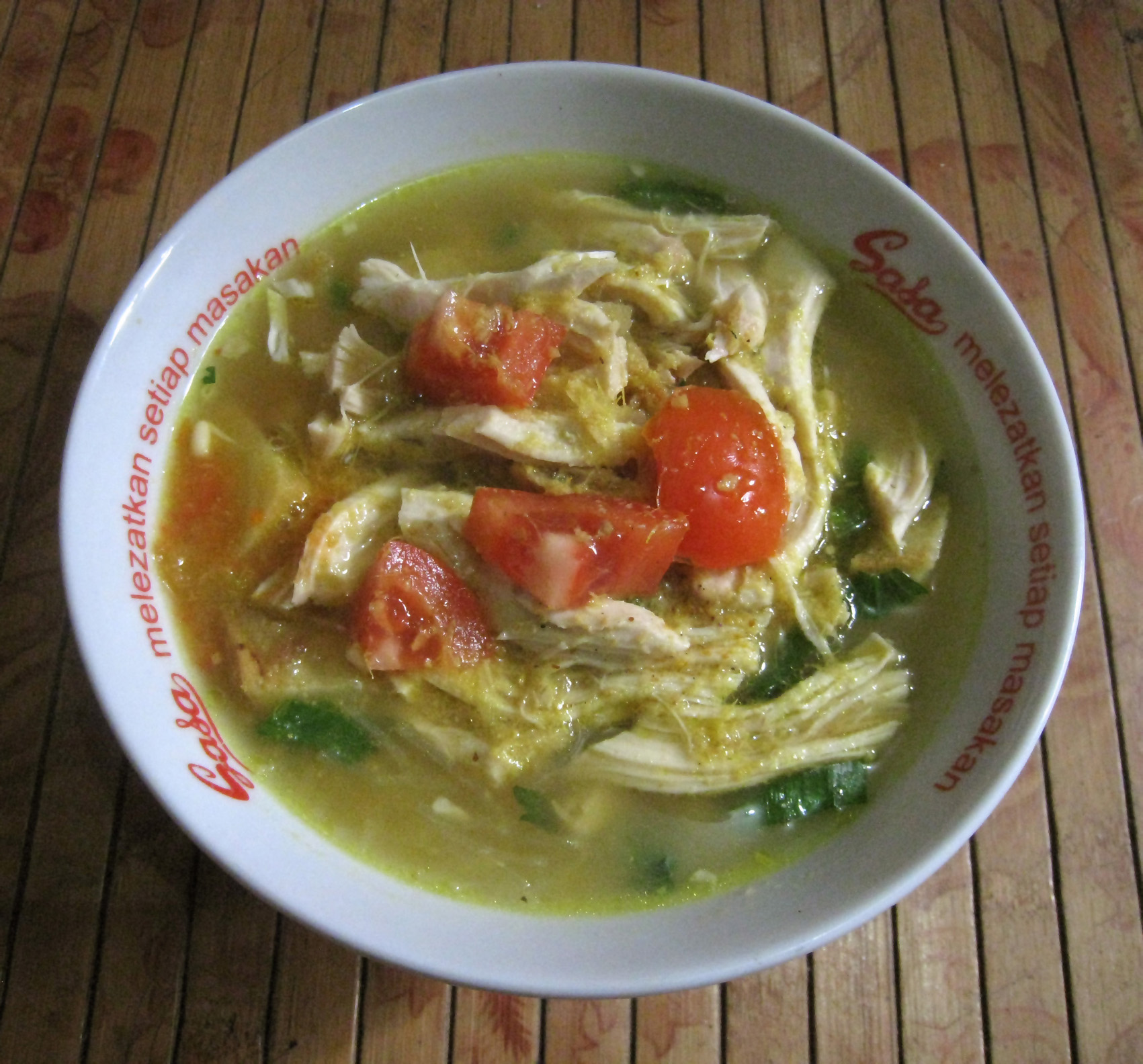
Soto ayam, chicken soto in soup with turmeric and spices

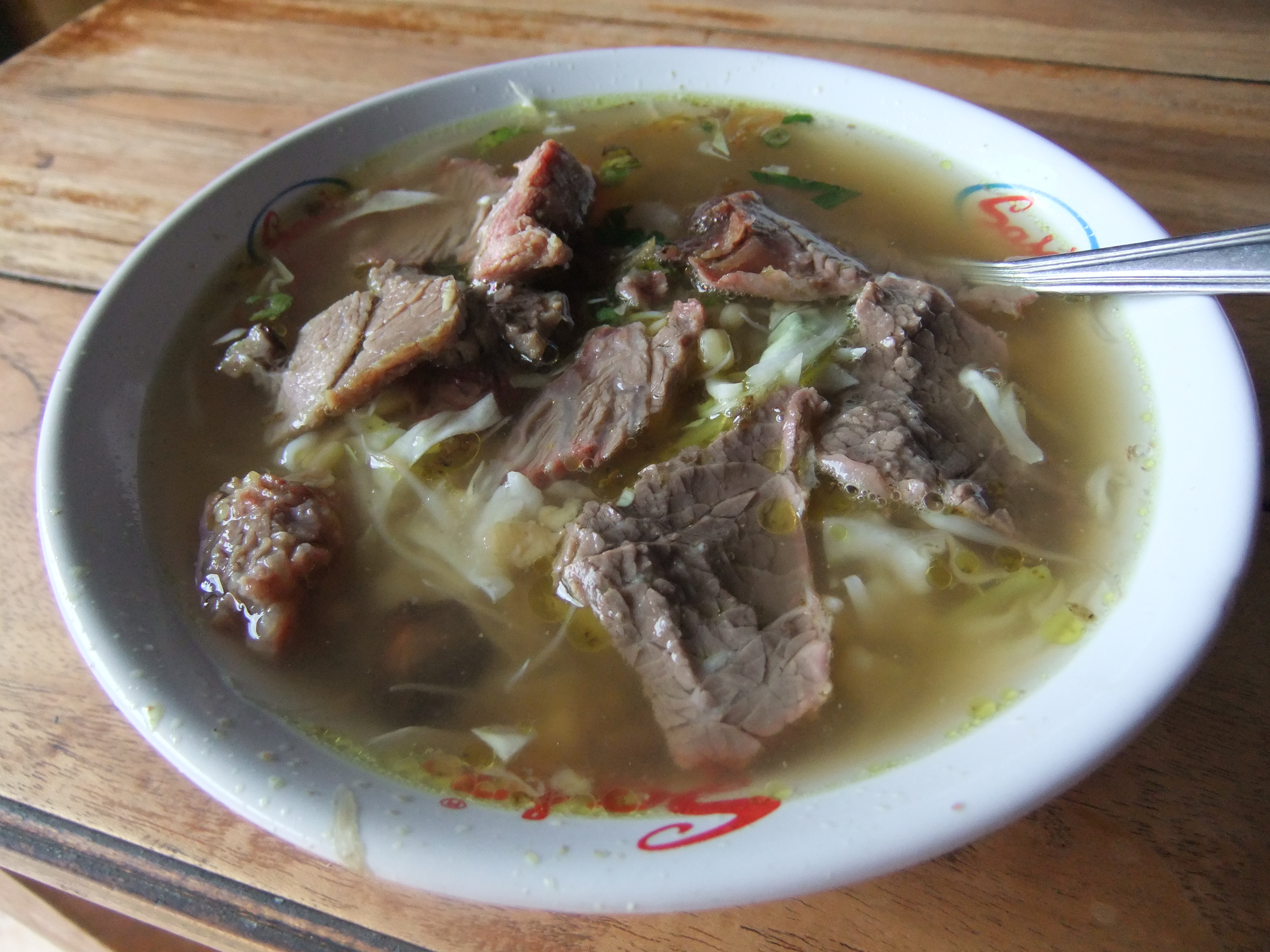
Soto sapi, beef soto from Yogyakarta

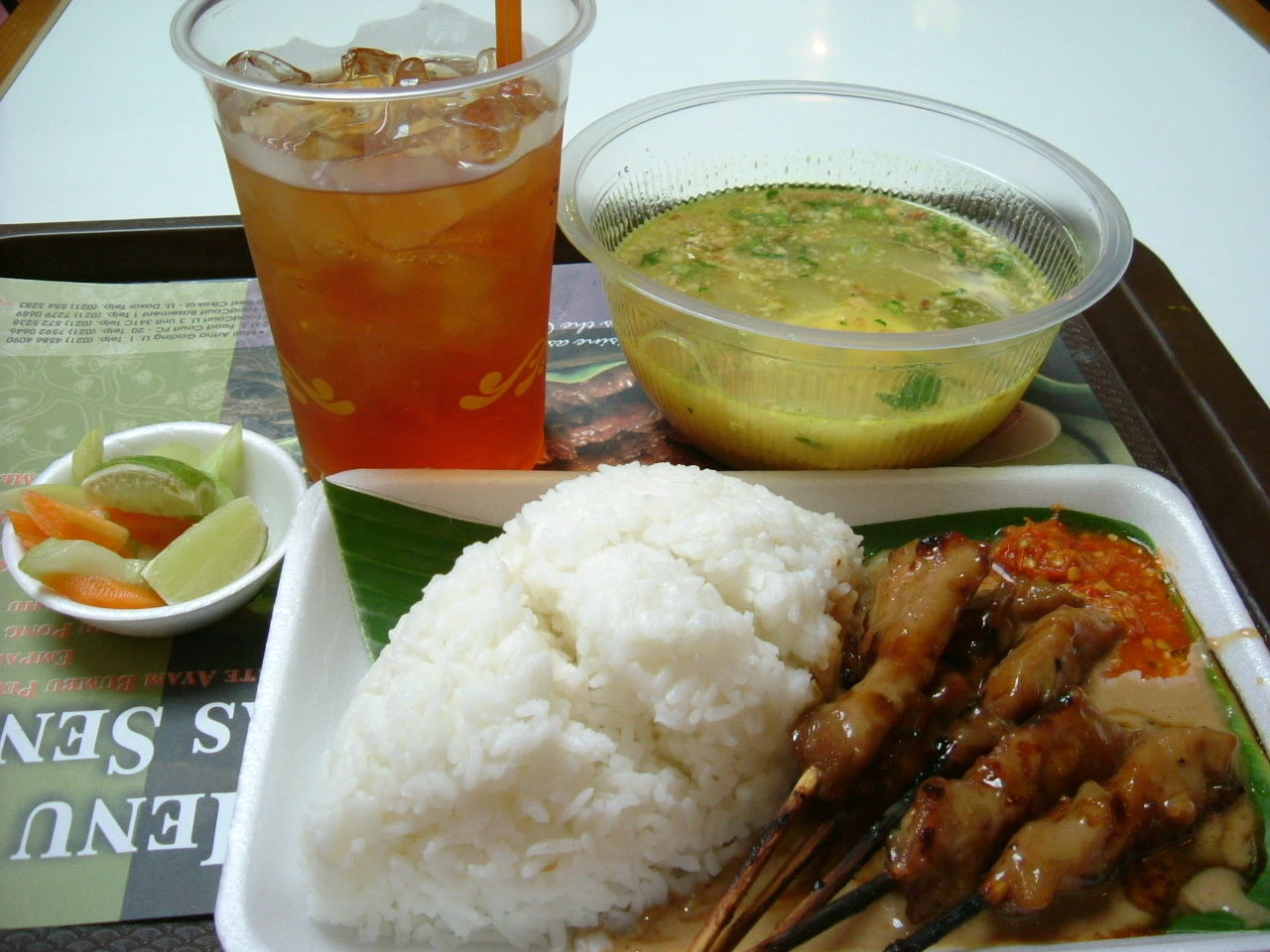
Soto ambengan

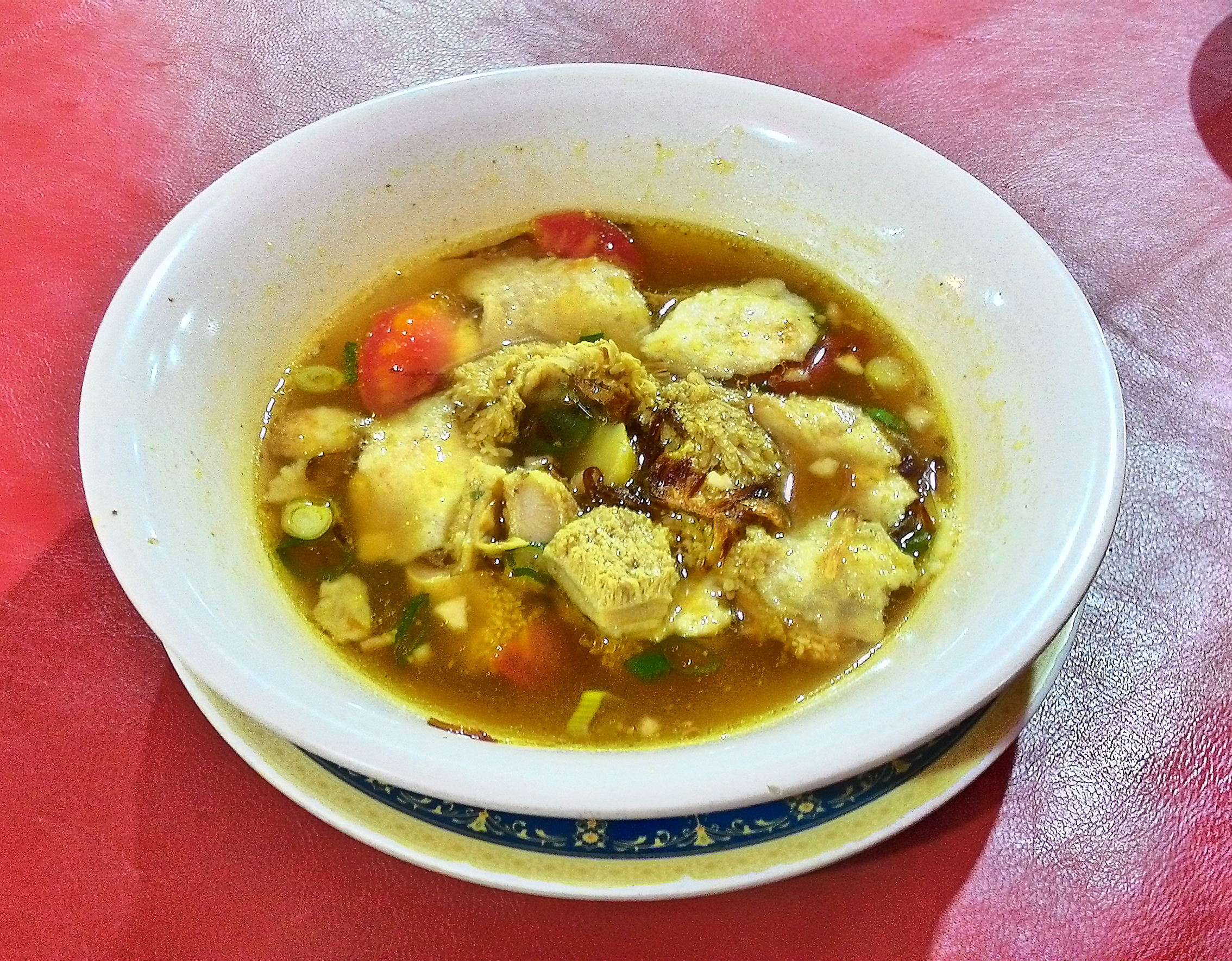
Soto babat, tripe soto

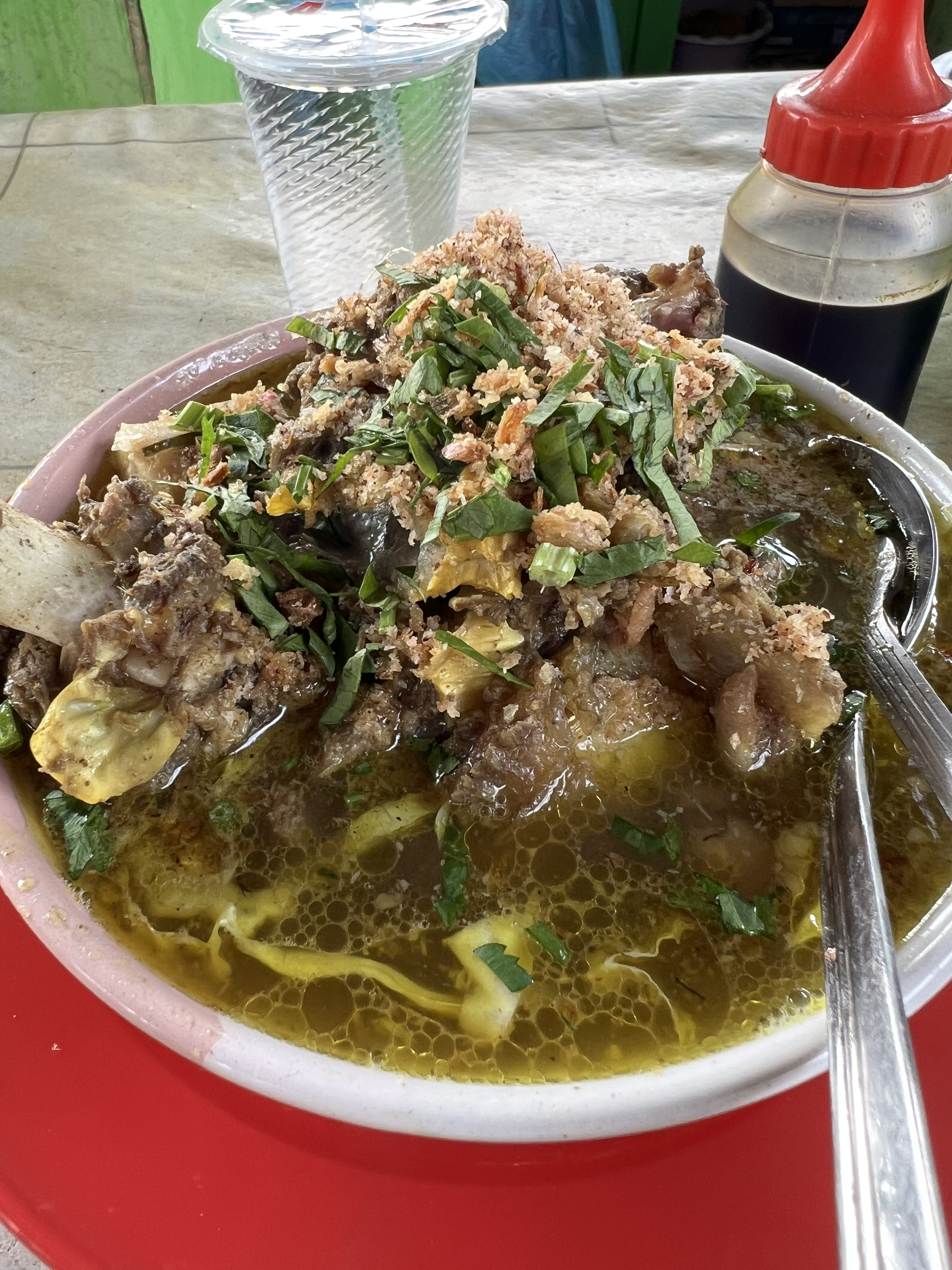
Soto kikil, skin and ligament soto

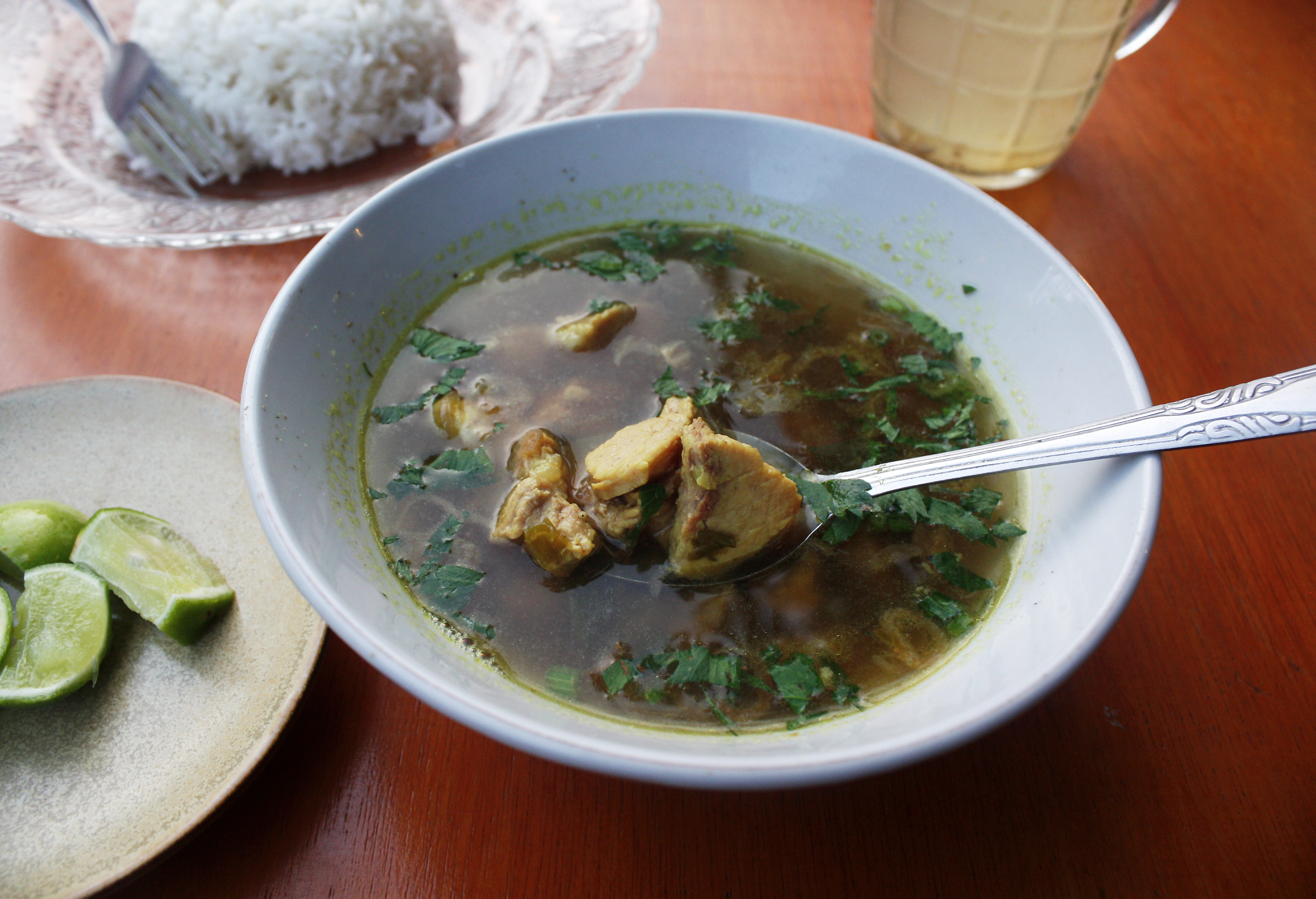
Soto babi, pork soto, a specialty of Balinese cuisine

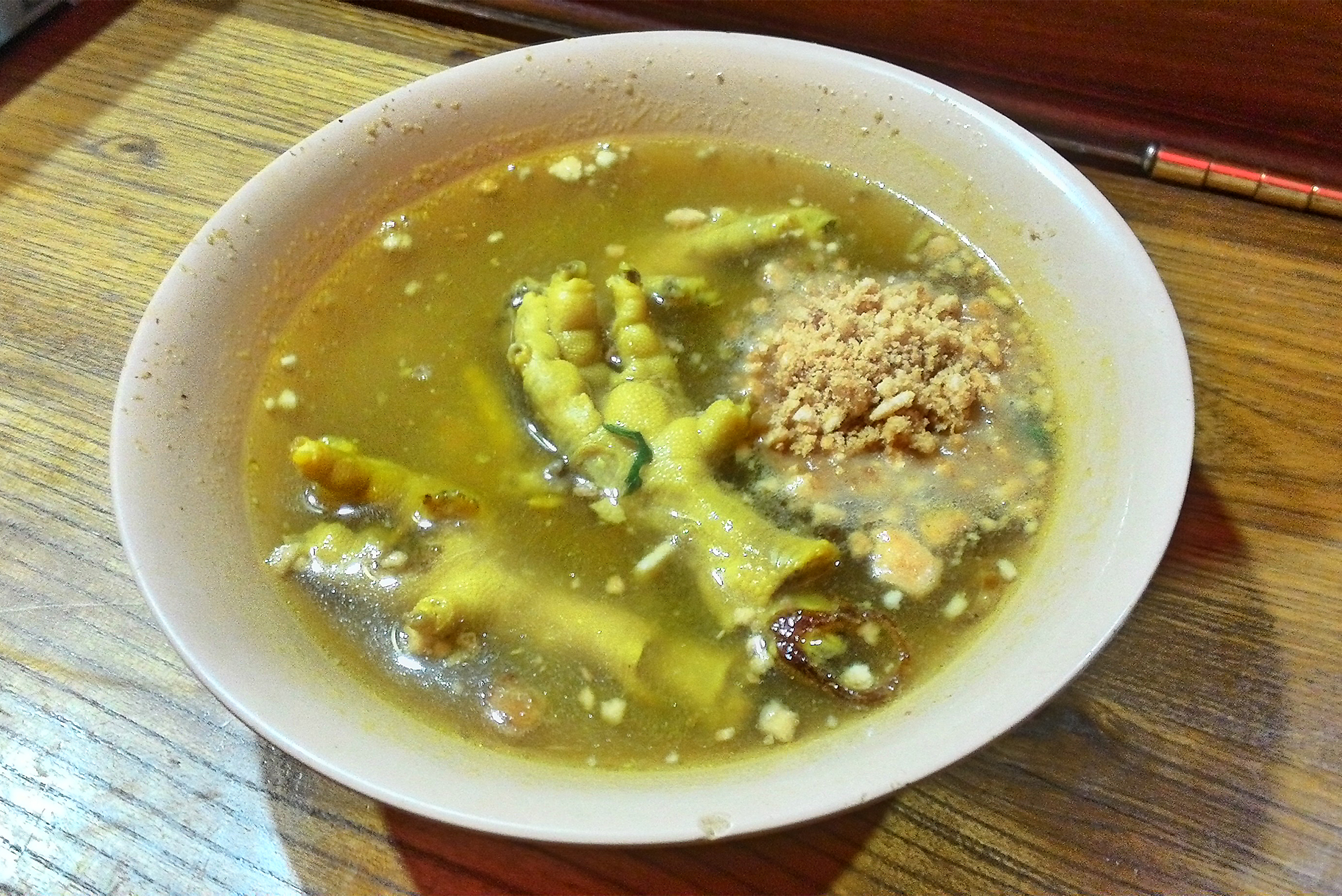
Soto ceker, chicken feet soto

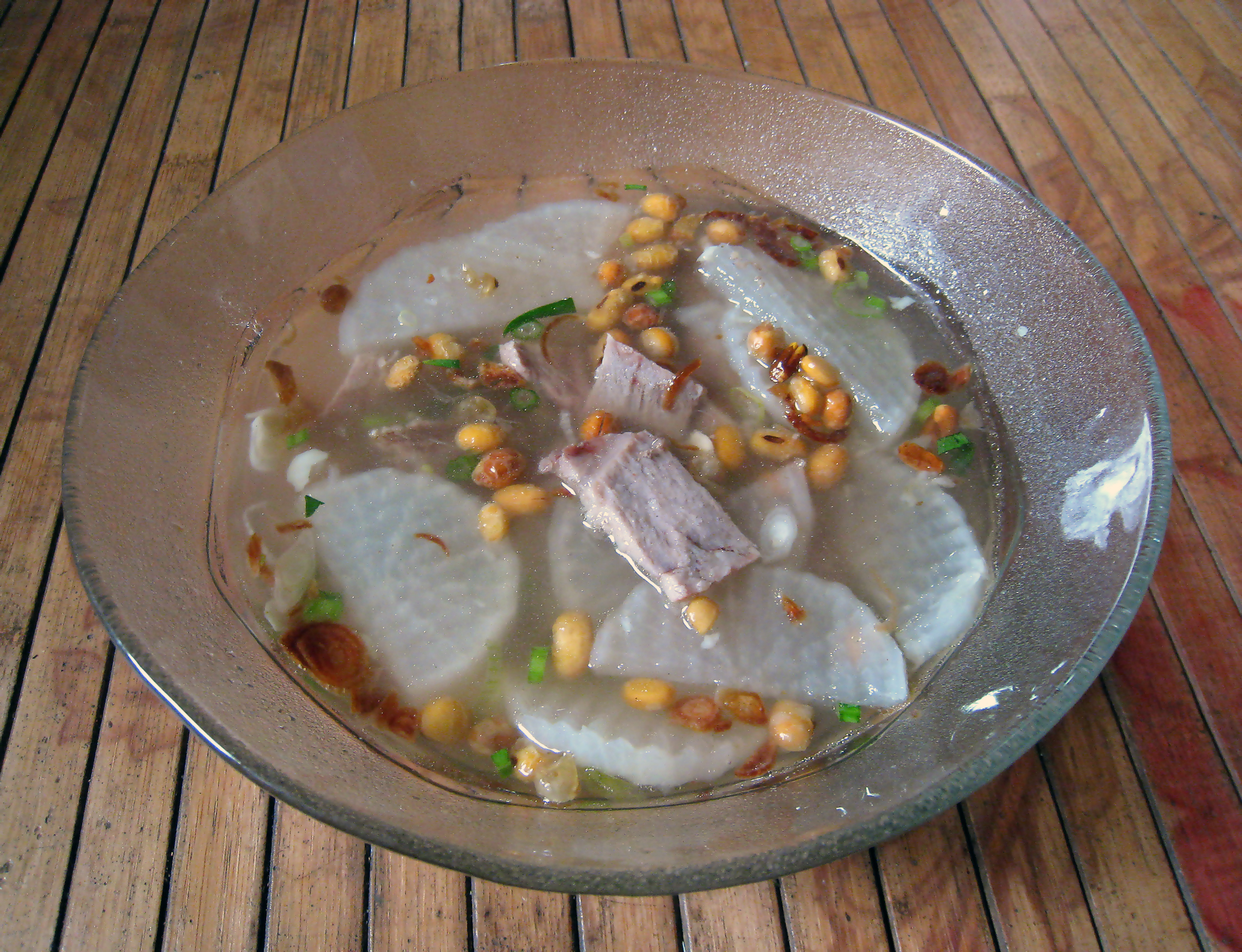
Soto Bandung, beef in clear broth with white radish and fried soy nuts

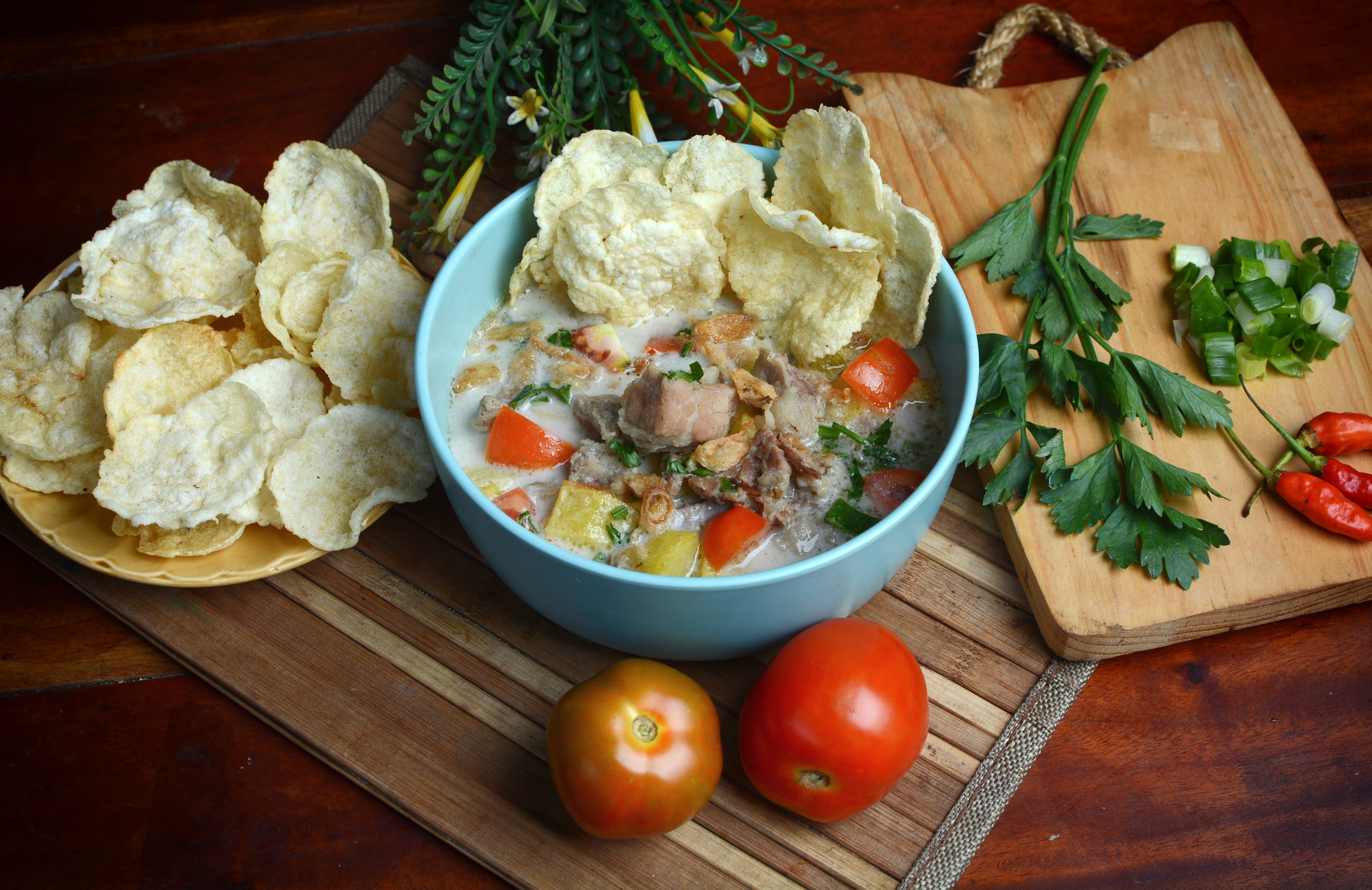
Soto Betawi from Jakarta

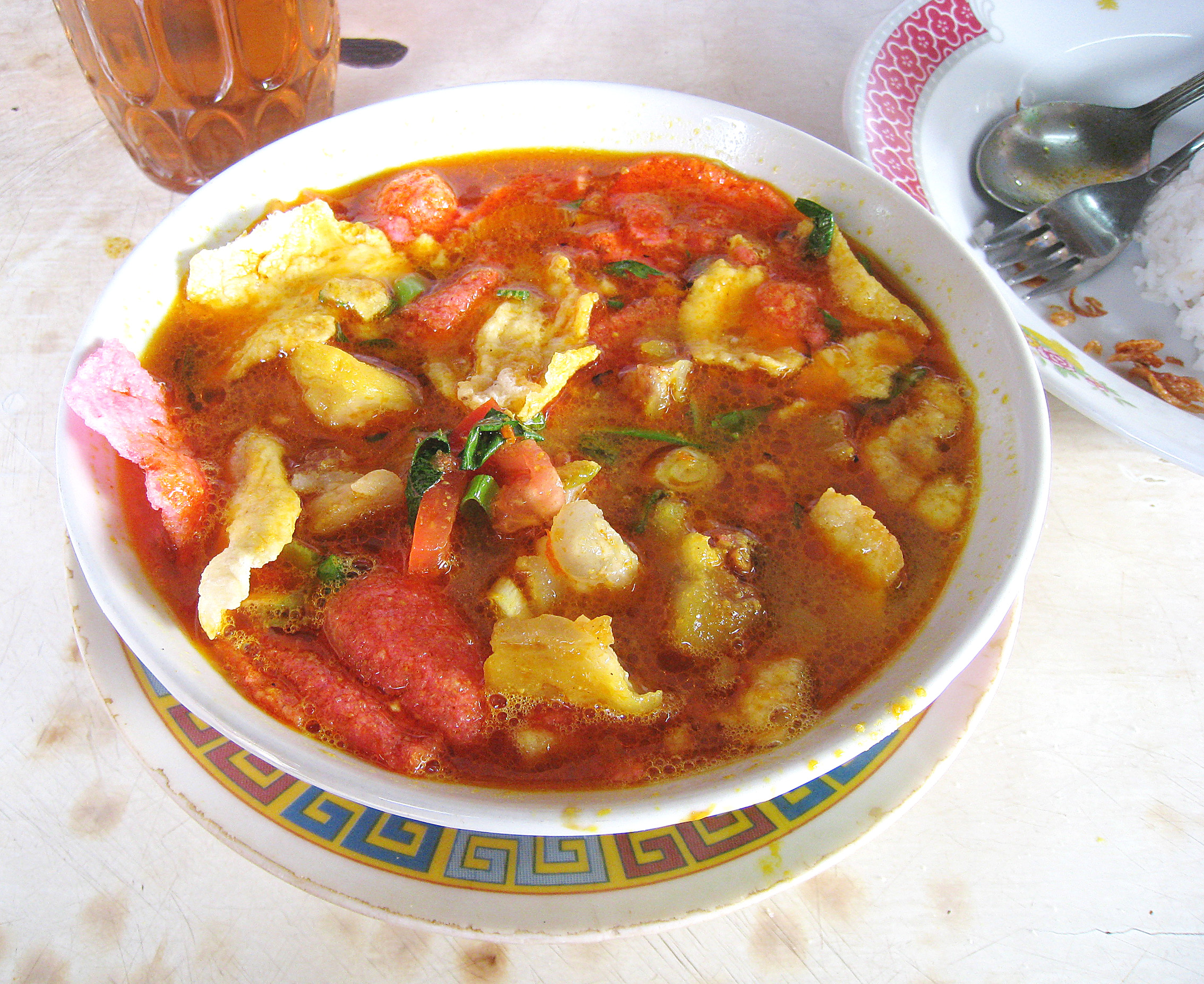
Soto kaki mencos (cow's foot tendons soto), a Betawi specialty

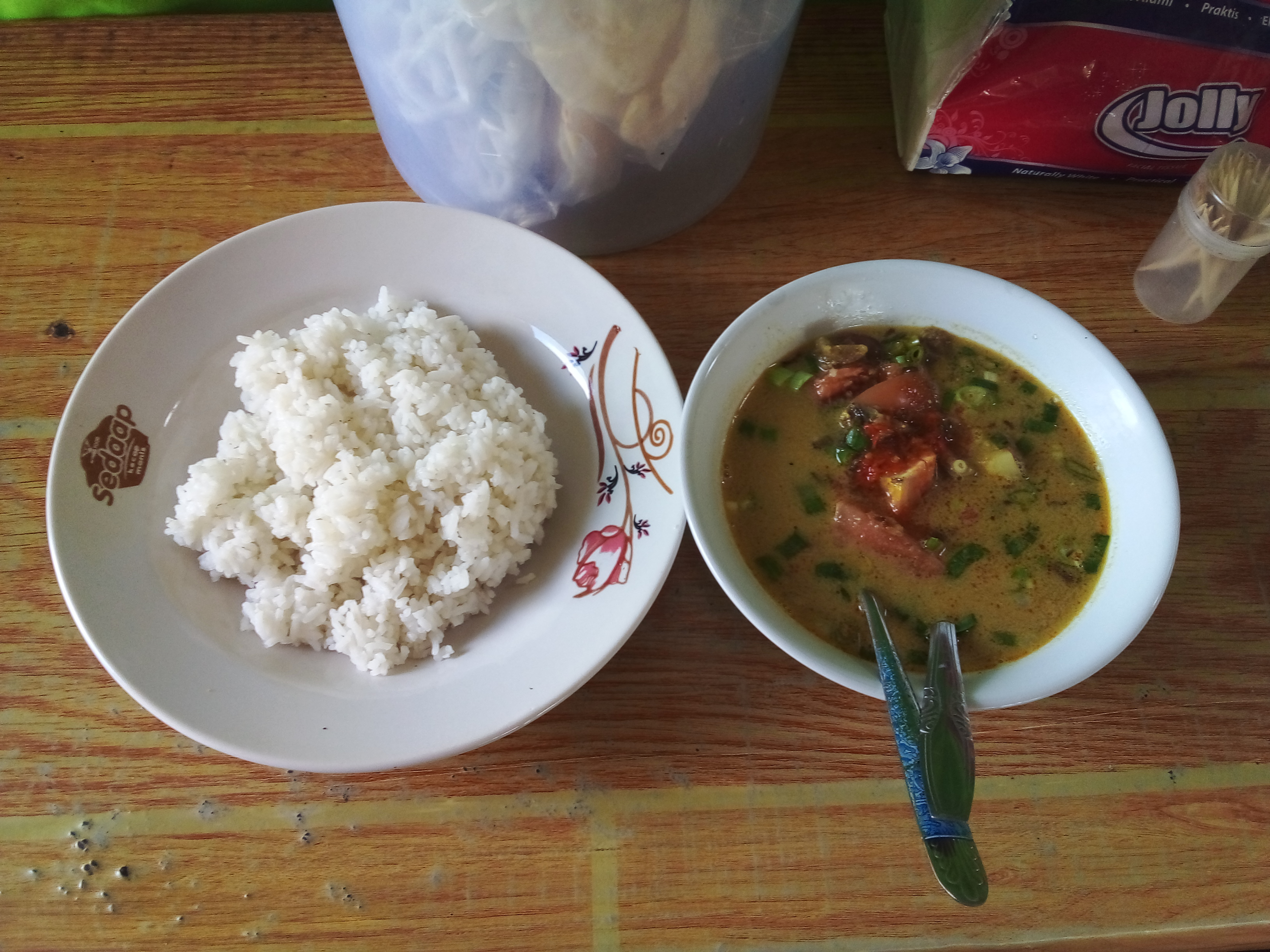
Soto tangkar with rice

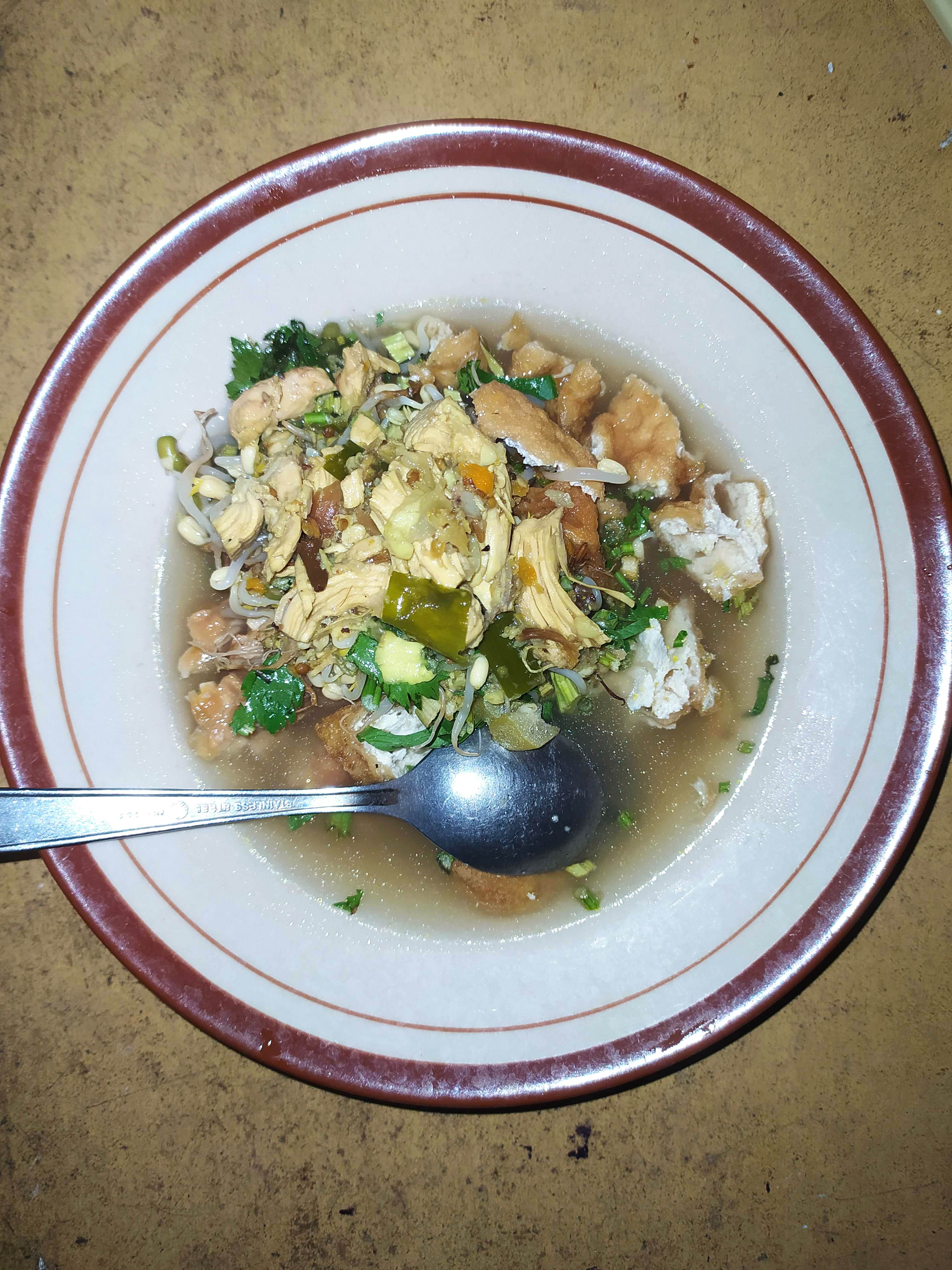
Soto kemiri spiced with candlenut

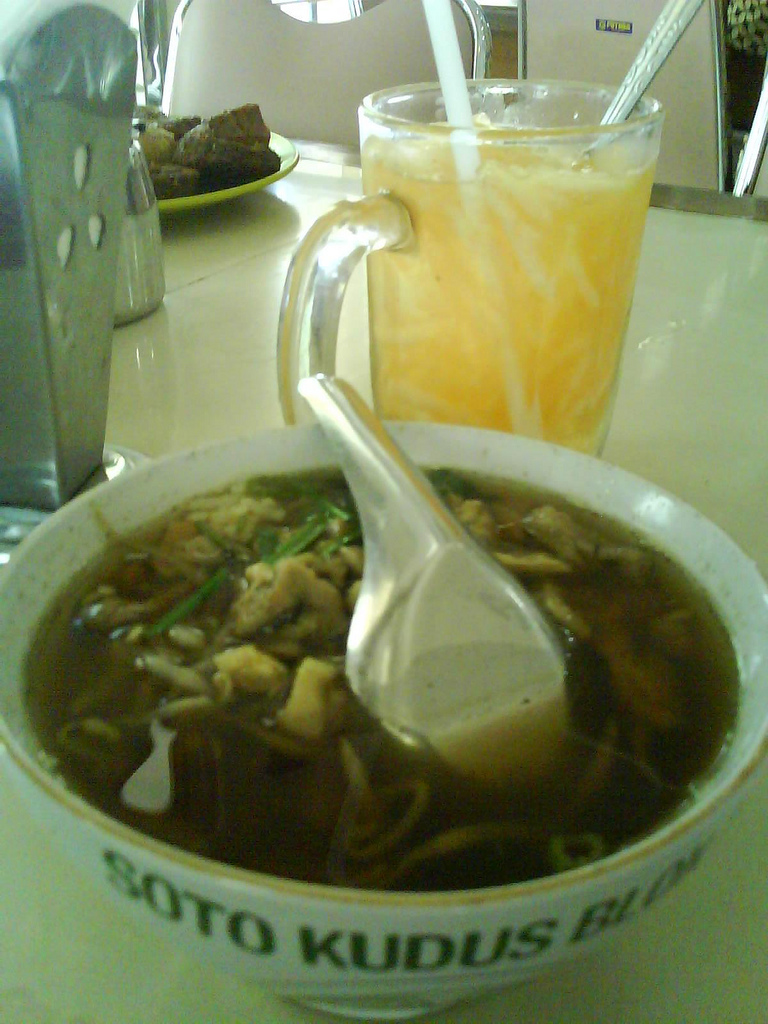
Soto Kudus, a type of chicken soto

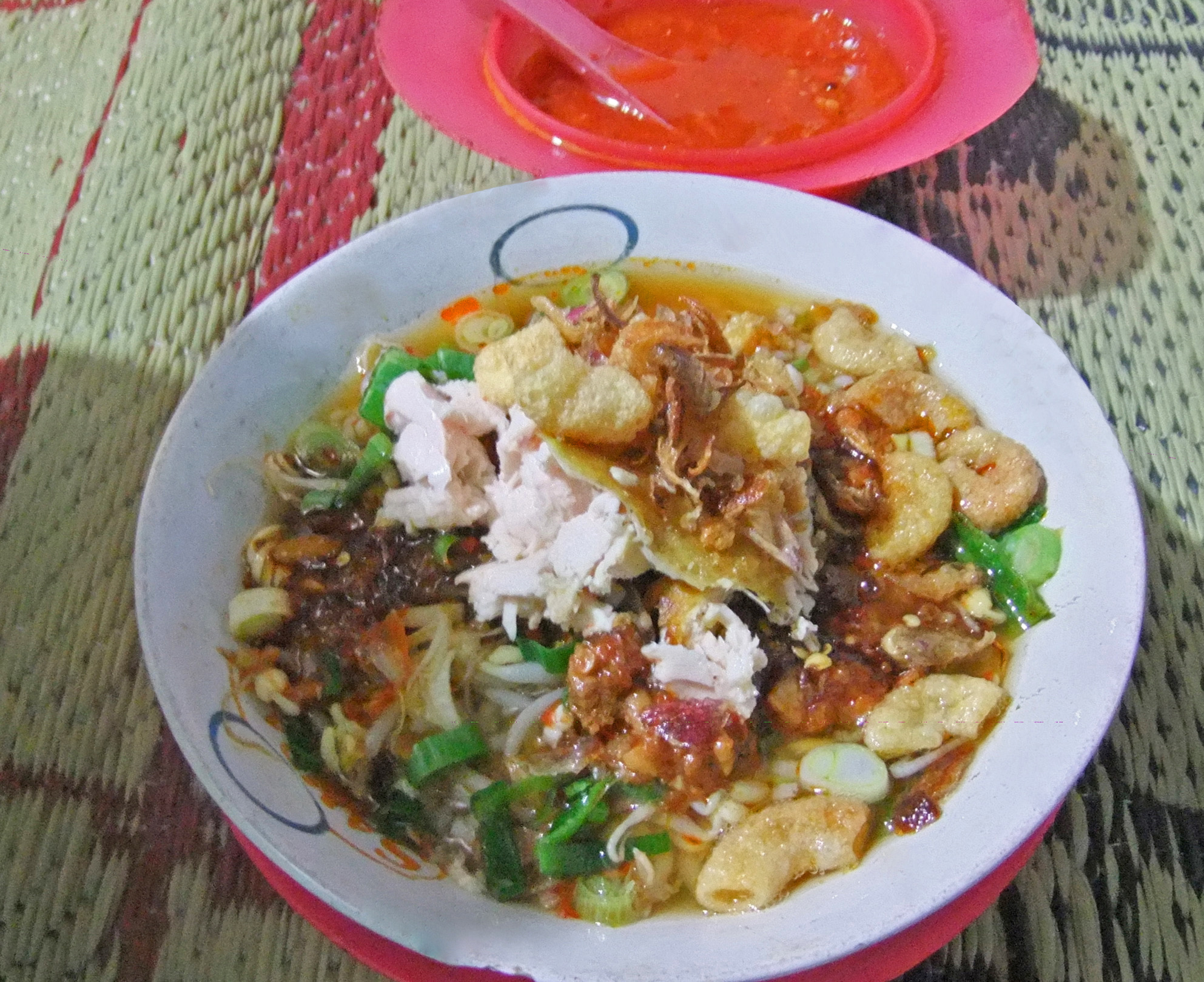
Sauto Tegal, chicken soto

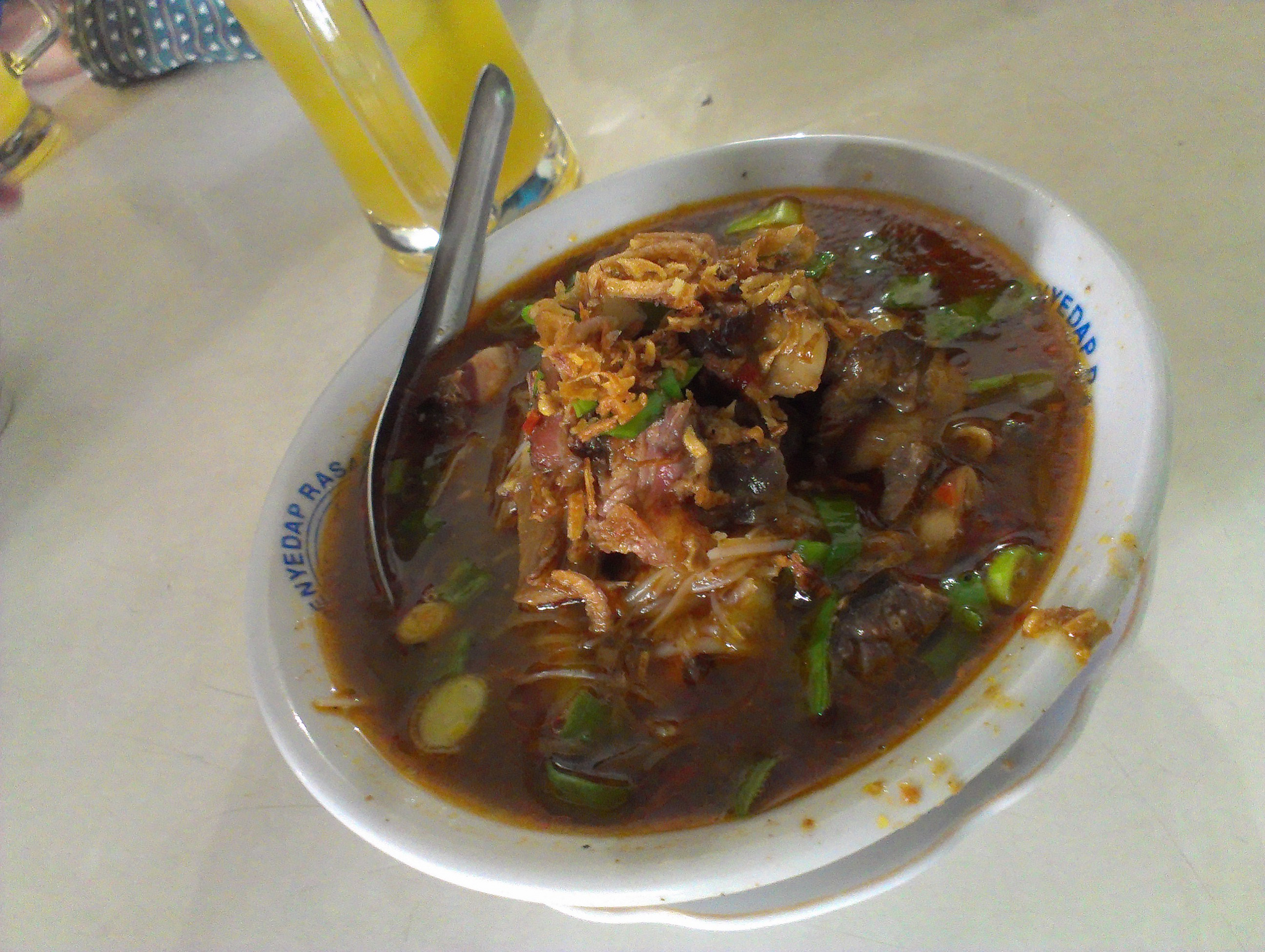
Tauto Pekalongan

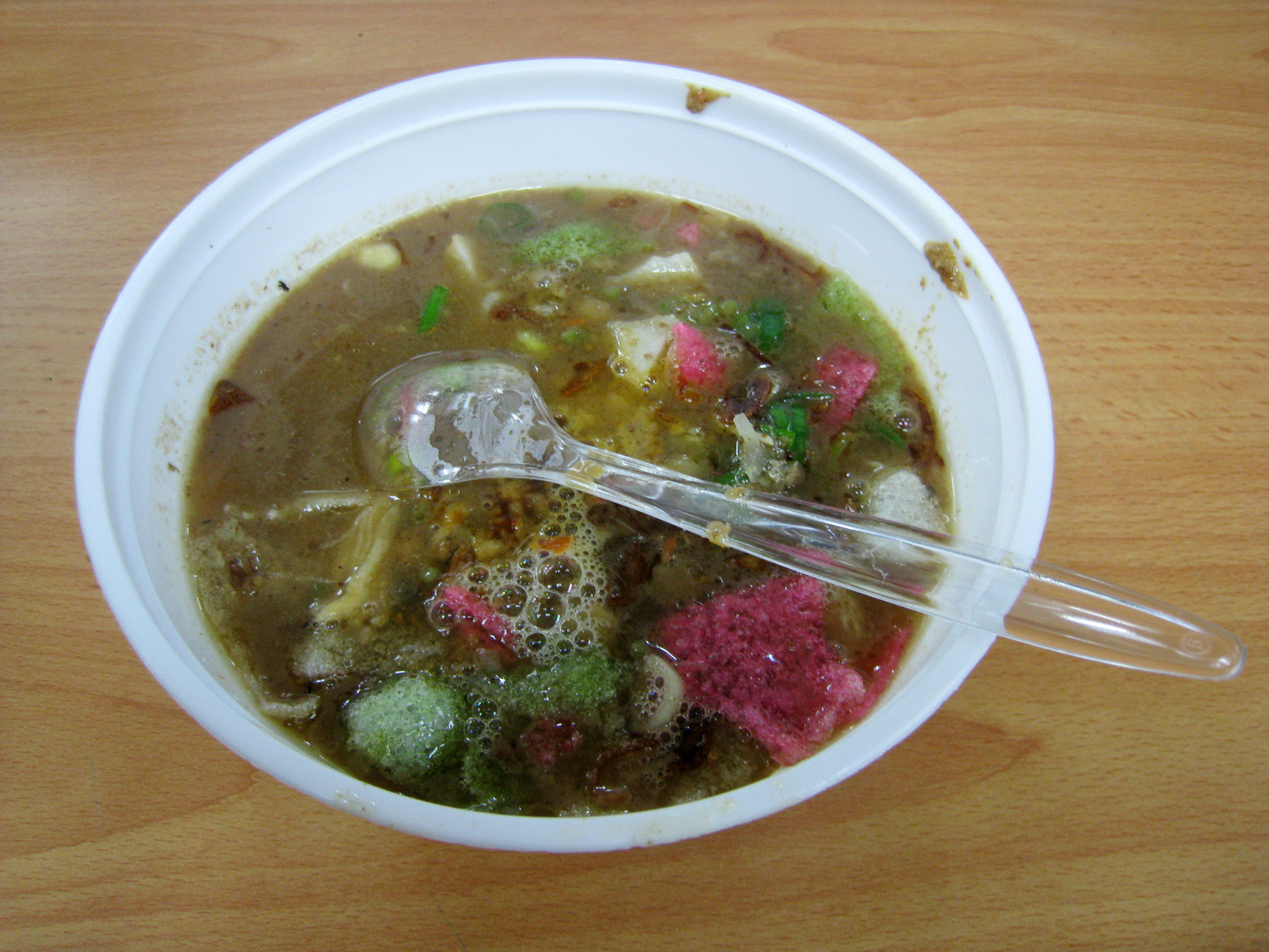
Sroto Sokaraja, Banyumas

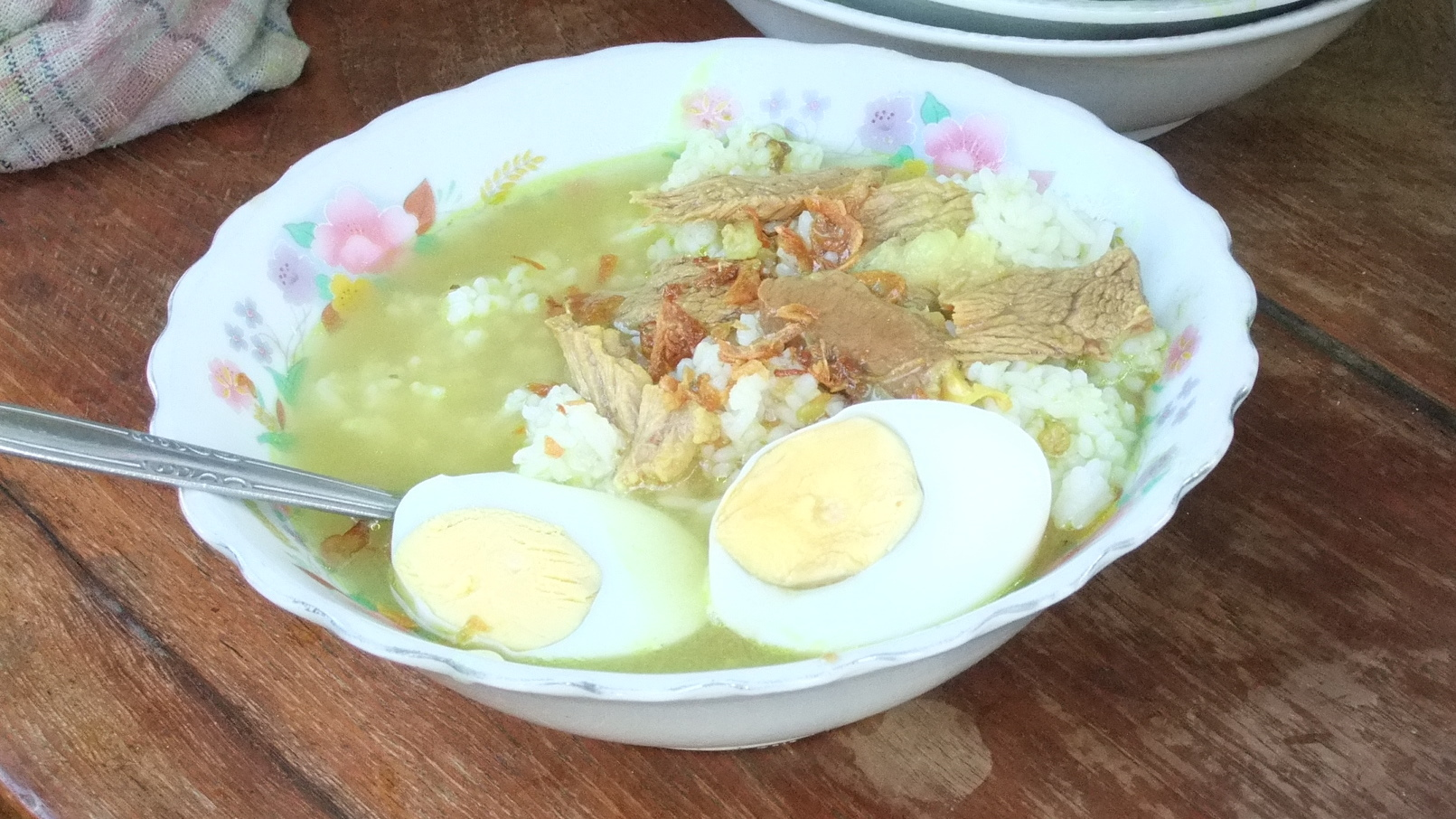
Soto Madura with egg

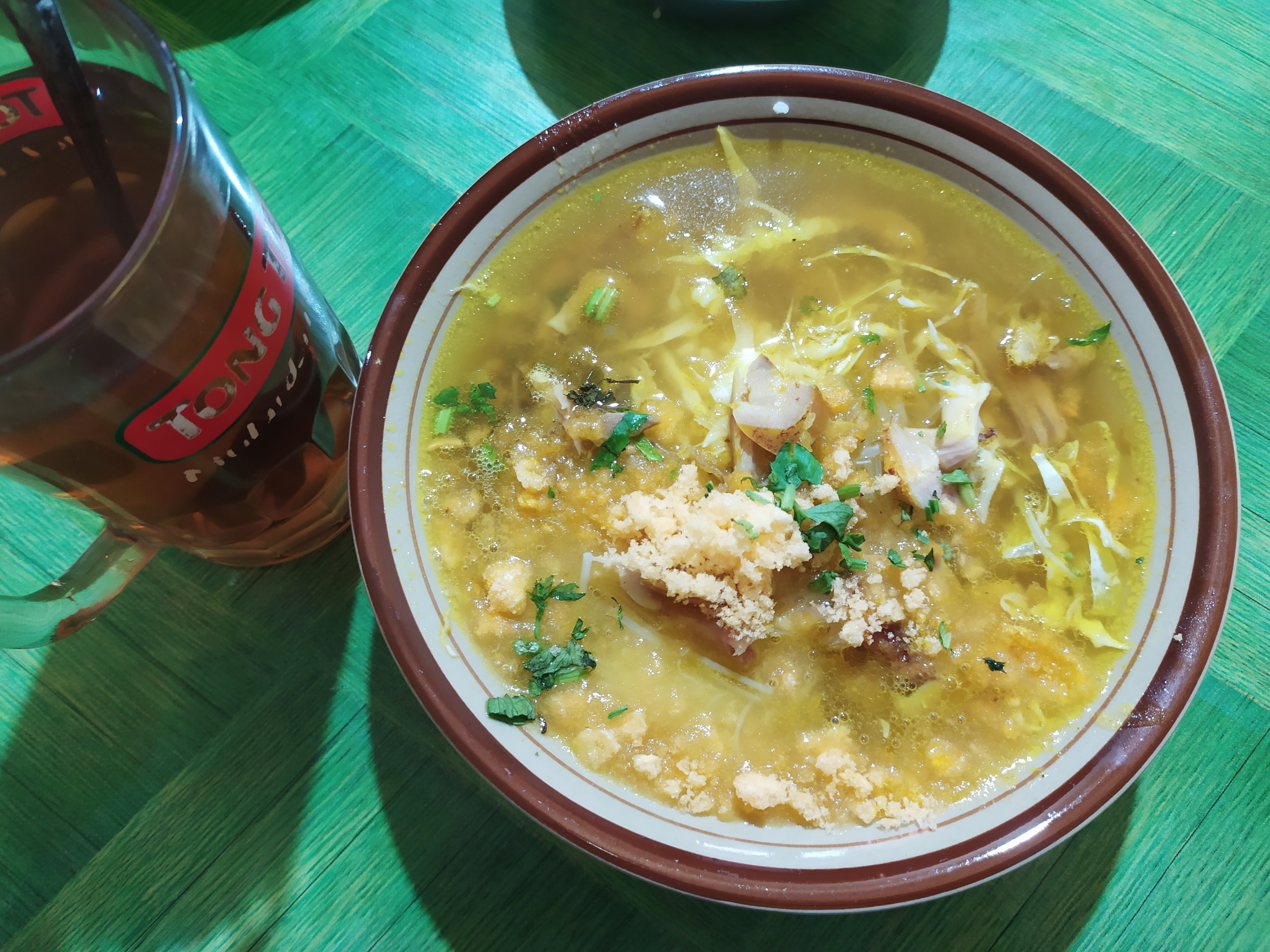
Soto Lamongan

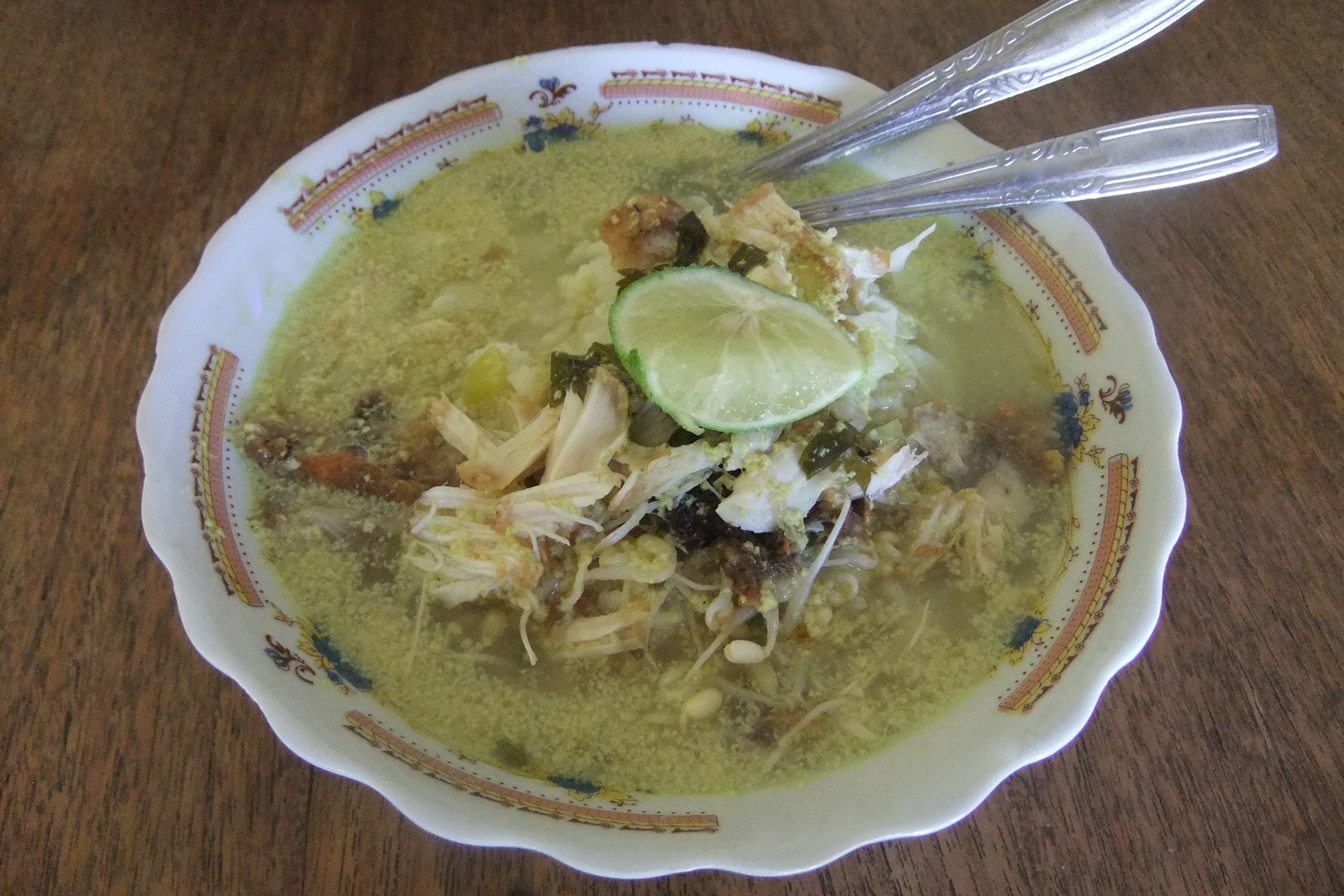
Soto Kediri

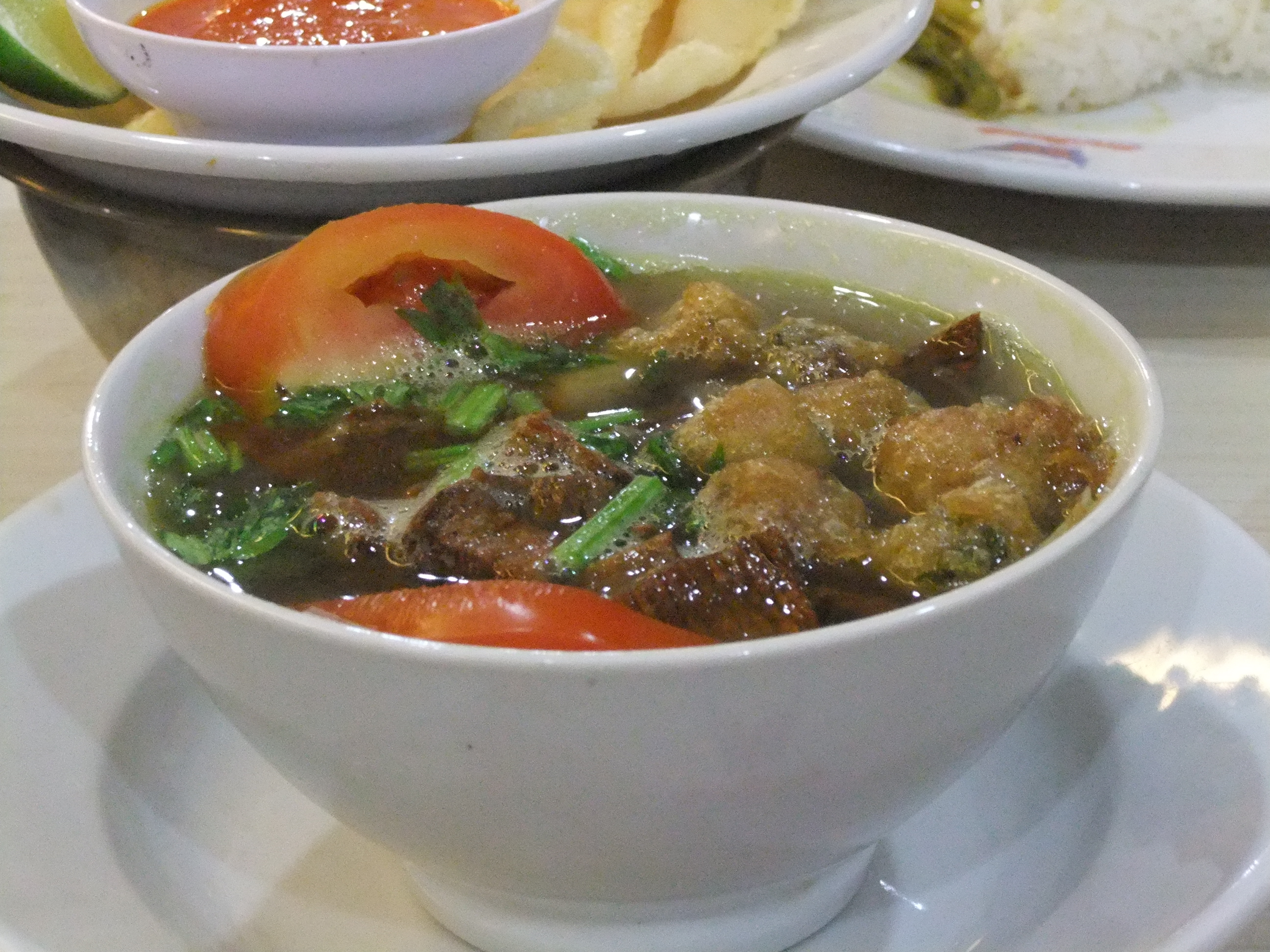
Soto Padang, beef soto

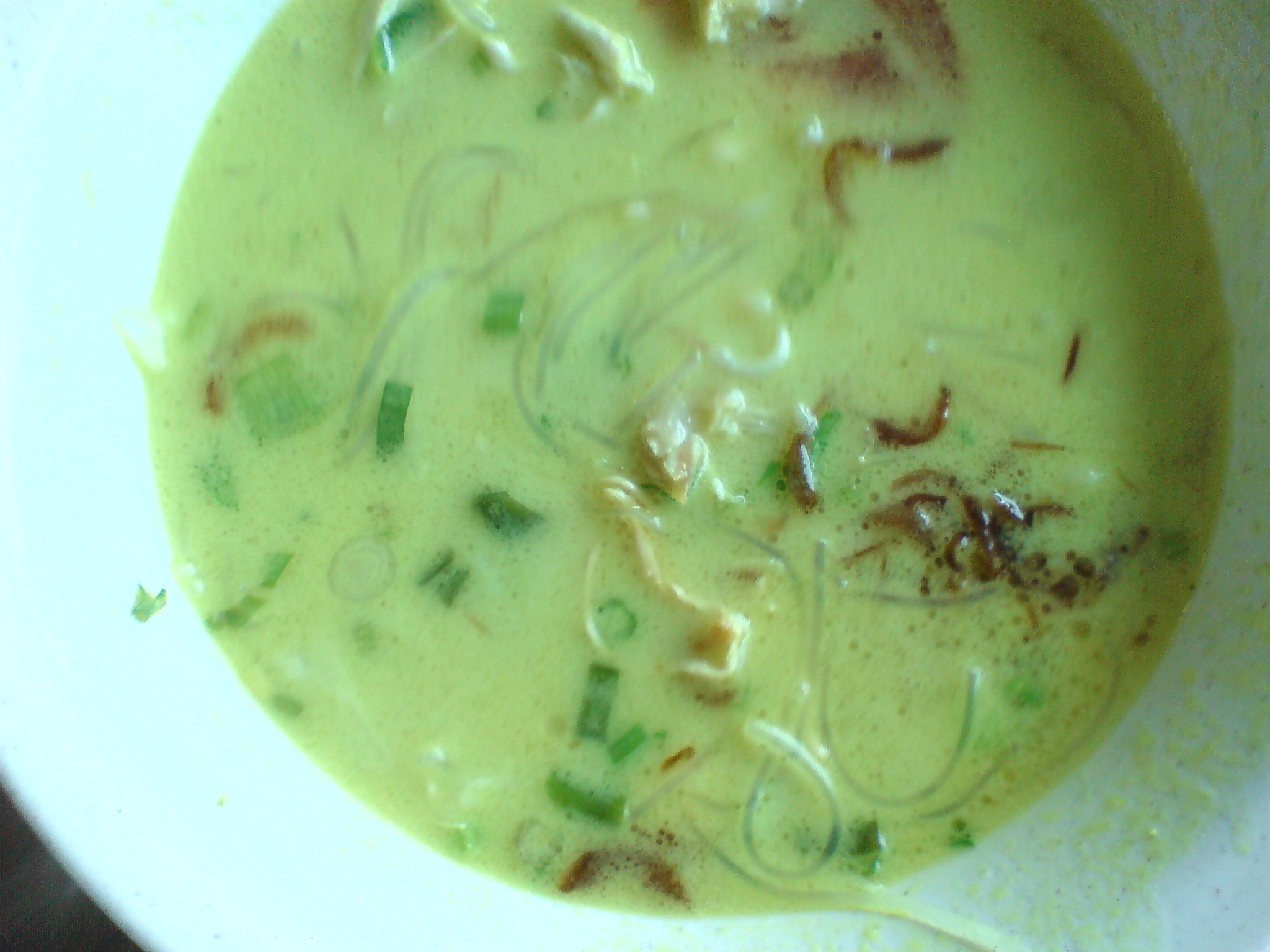
Soto Medan

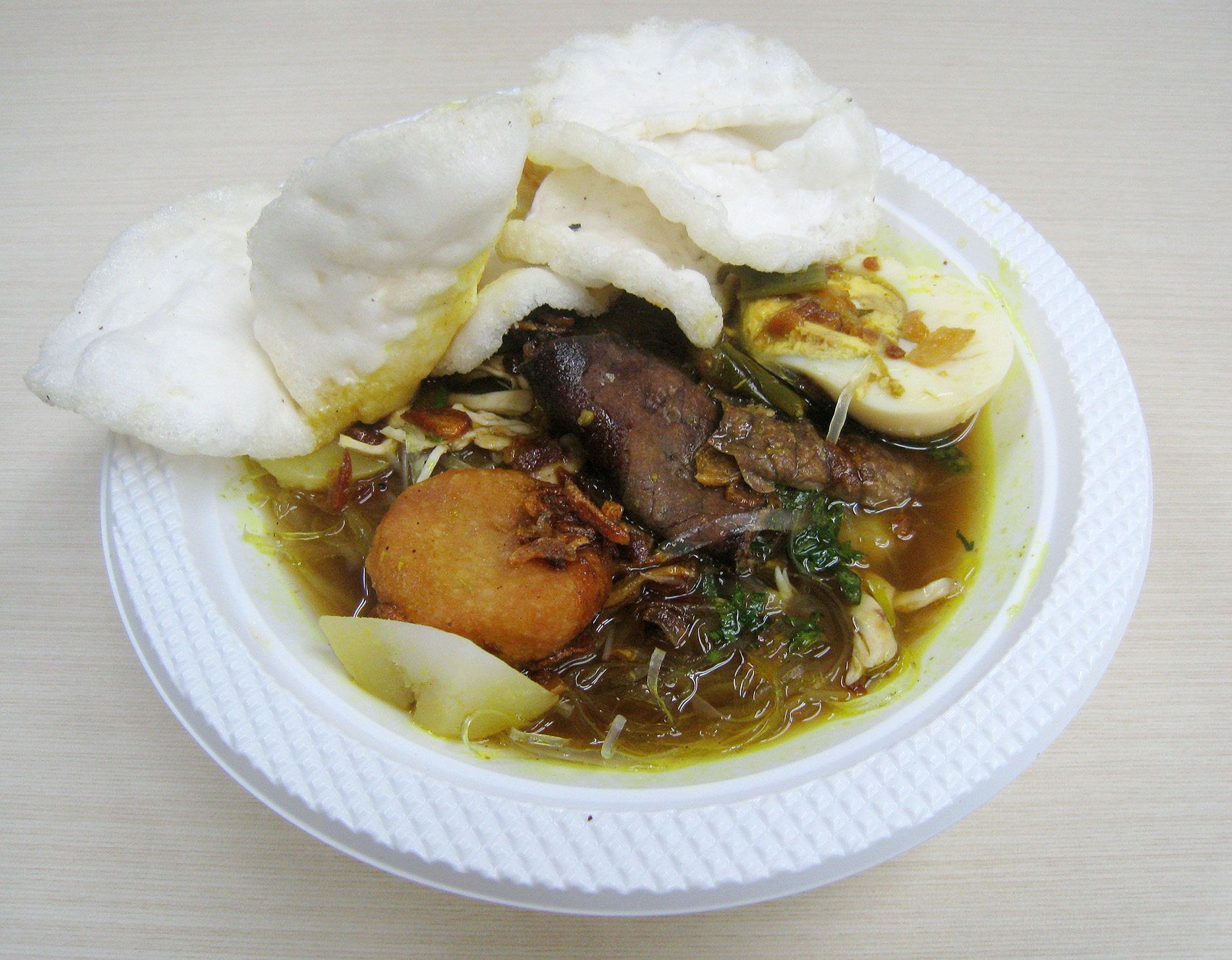
Soto Banjar

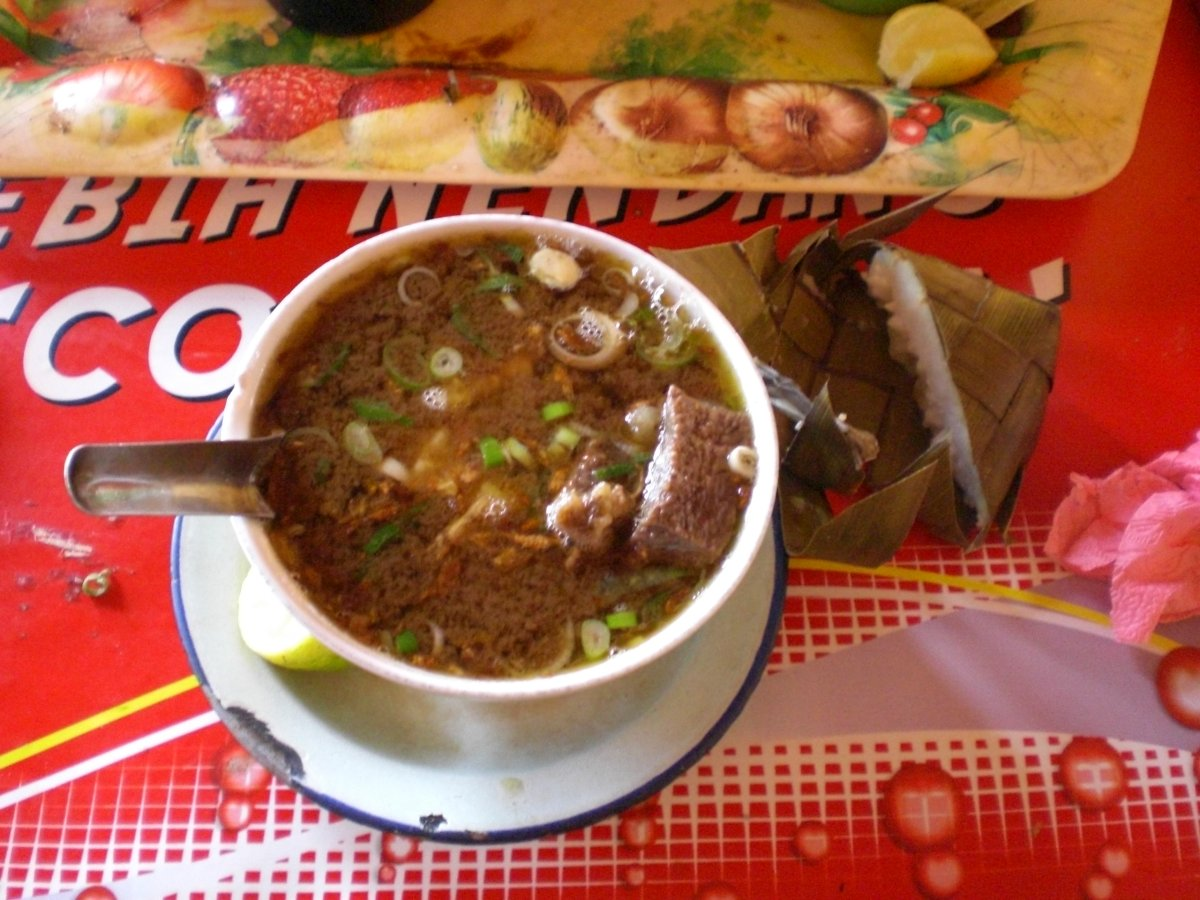
Coto Makassar, beef soto

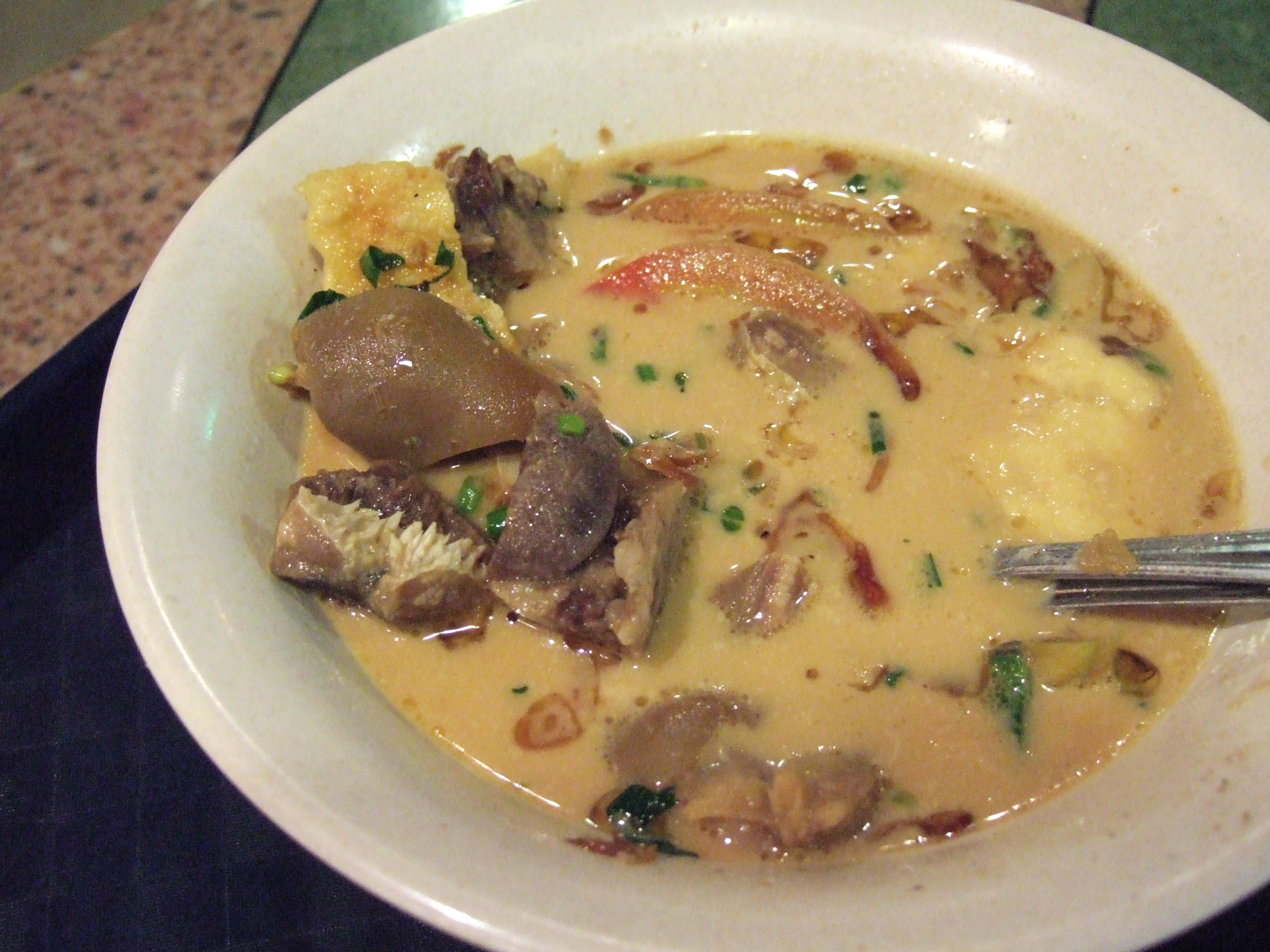
Soto kambing, goat soto

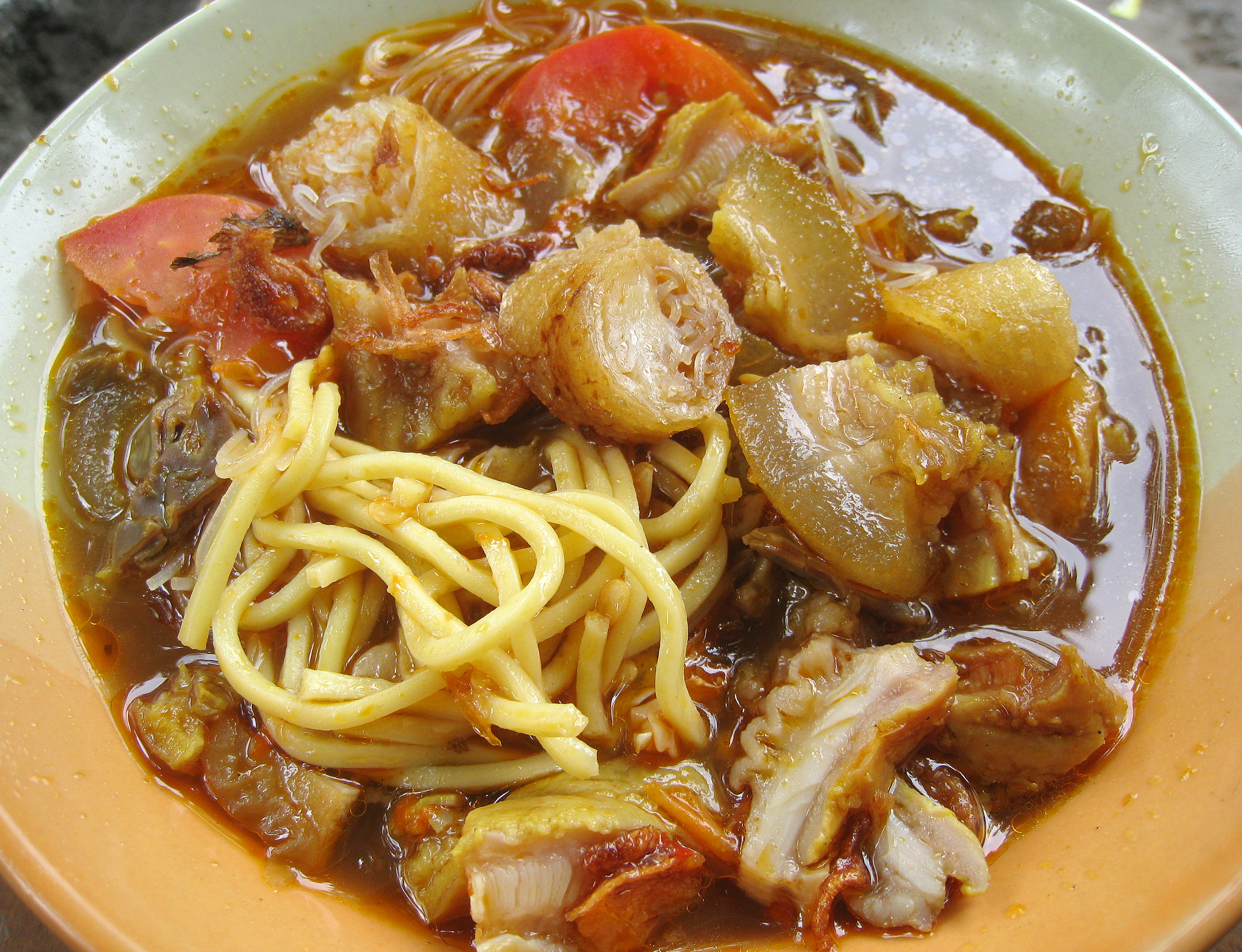
Soto mie Bogor, noodle soup dish

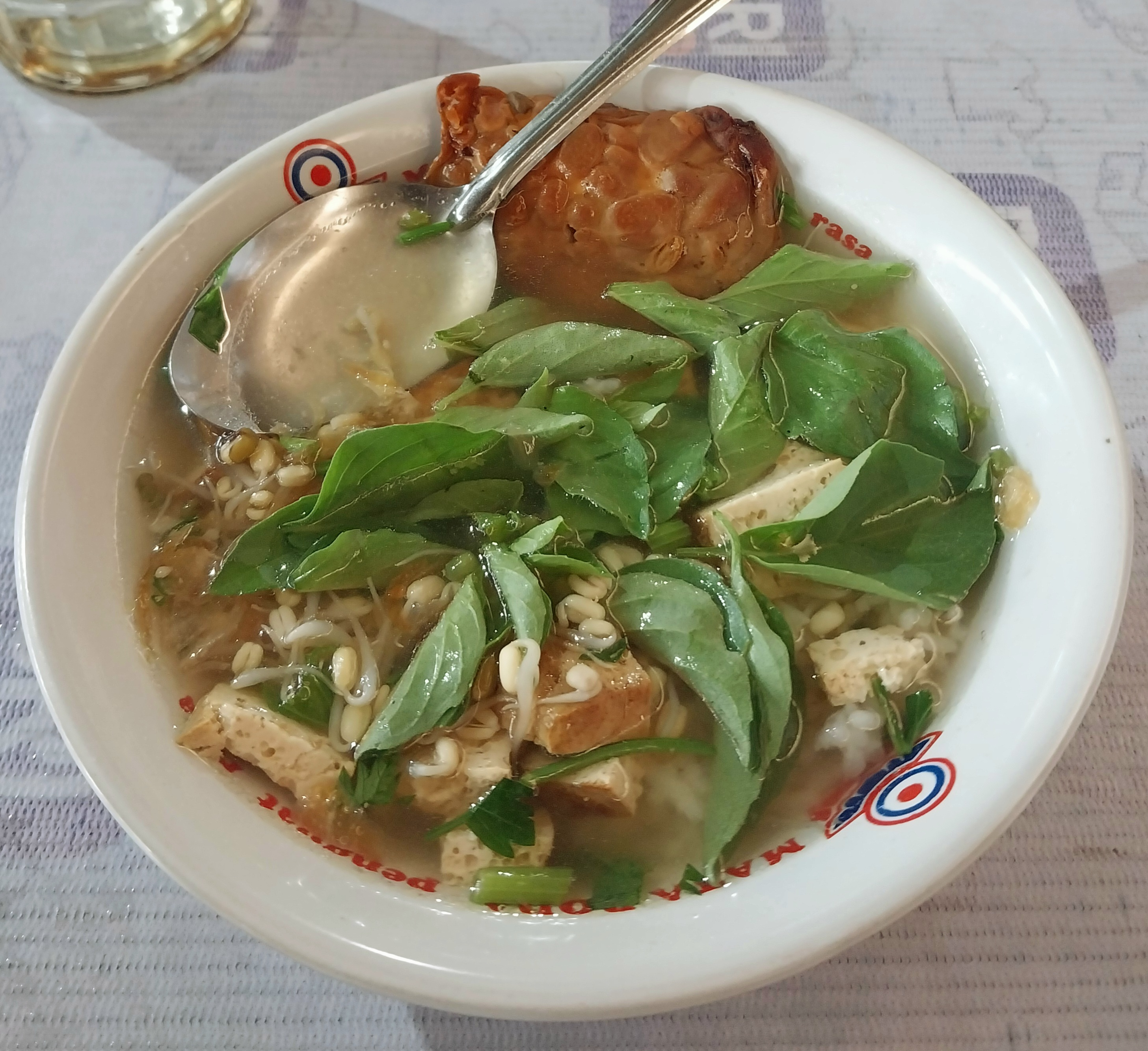
Soto kemangi

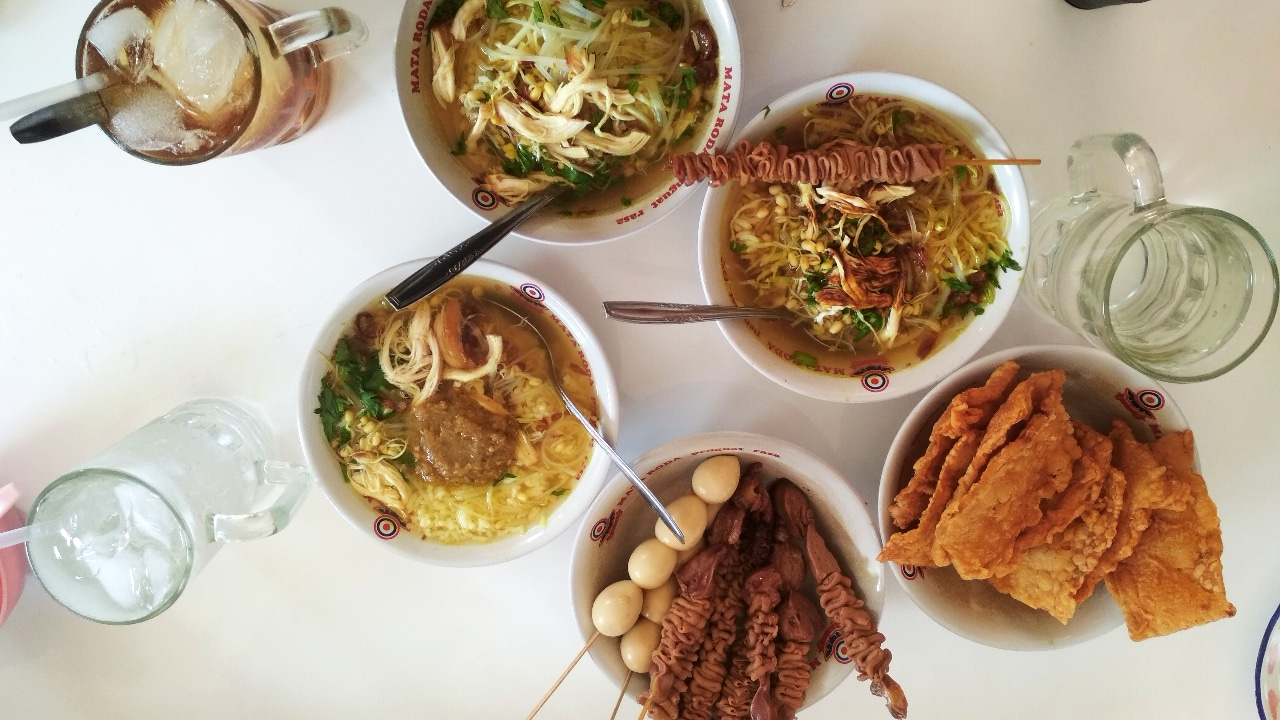
A complete soto dish is usually served for breakfast in Yogyakarta and its surroundings

== See also ==
- Soto ayam
- Sop saudara, spicy Bugis-Makassar beef soup.
- Konro, Bugis-Makassar spicy cow's ribs soup, similar or related to ribs soto
- Tongseng, Javanese spicy mutton soup also related to soto
- Gulai, the Javanese gulai is soupy, similar to mutton or goat soto but slightly different in spices
- Empal gentong
- List of Indonesian soups
- List of soups
