= Makassar cuisine =

Cuisine of the Makassar and Buginese people of Indonesia

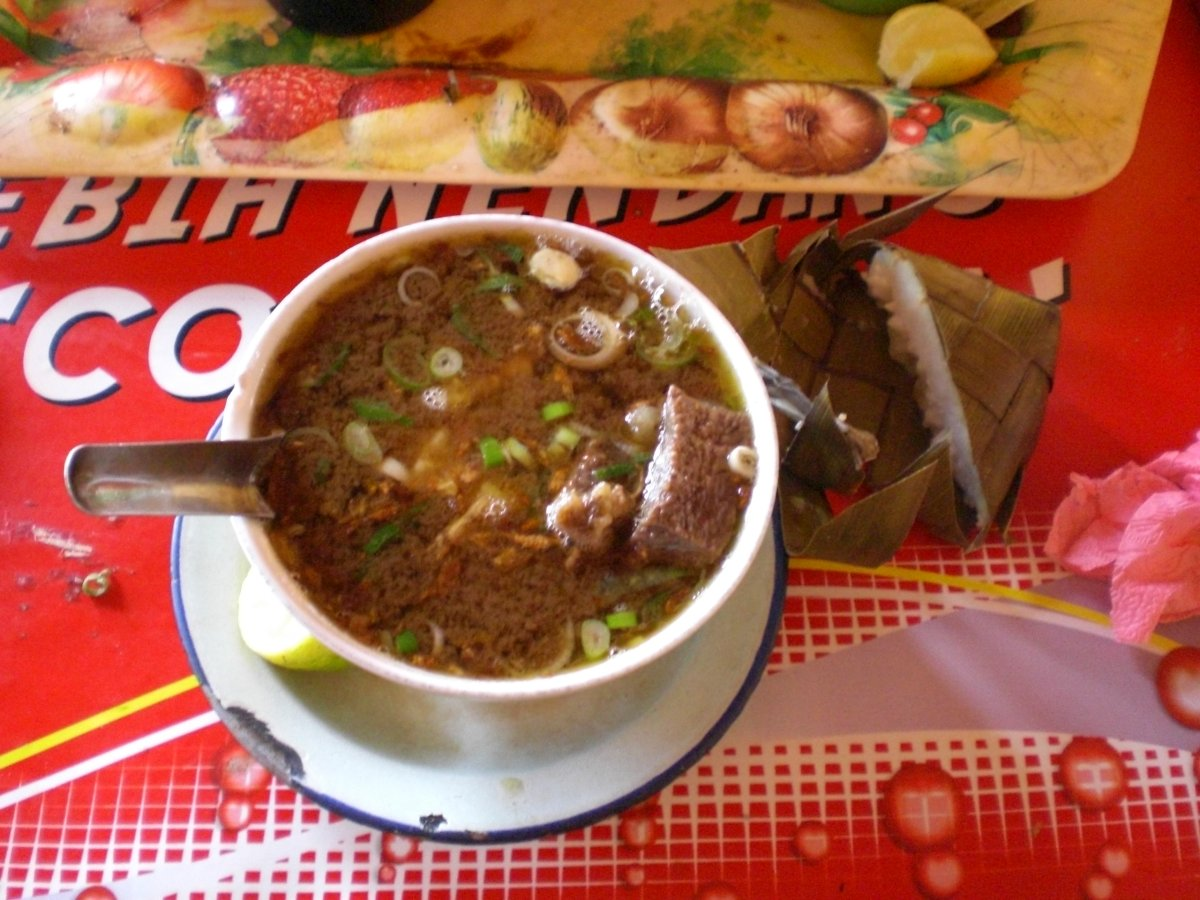
Coto Makassar

Makassarese cuisine is the cuisine of Makassarese people of Makassar in the South Sulawesi province of Indonesia.

== Dishes ==
- Coto makassar, a stew made from the mixture of nuts, spices, and selected offal which may include beef brain, tongue and intestine.
- Pallubasa, a similar dish to Coto Makassar, but with the addition of coconut.
- Konro, a rib dish.
- Burasa or Ketupat, a glutinous rice cake, usually eaten with Coto Makassar and Konro.
- Ayam goreng sulawesi (Celebes fried chicken); the chicken is marinated with a traditional soy sauce recipe for up to 24 hours before being fried to a golden colour. The dish is usually served with chicken broth, rice and special sambal (chilli sauce).
- Nasi Goreng Merah, a Makassan styled fried rice made with tomato sauce as it's main ingredient.
- Mie kering, a type of dried noodle served with thick gravy and sliced chicken, shrimp, mushrooms, liver, and squid.
- Ikan bolu bakar, grilled milkfish.
- Ikan bakar parape, Makassan styled grilled fish, rabbitfishes are usually used for this dish.
- Ayam palekko, a spicy chicken stew dish.
- Songkolo bagadang, a savory glutinous rice dish.
- Pallumara, a spicy and tangy fish stew.
- Sop saudara, a spicy beef or buffalo soup.
- Kapurung, a sago starch soup.
- Jalangkote, fried dumpling filled with rice vermicelli noodles and various kind of vegatables.
- Gogos, a cylinder-shaped savory rice cake dish.

== Sweets ==
- Barongko, a banana mashed with egg, coconut milk, sugar, and salt. It is wrapped in the banana leaf and then steamed.
- Kue Sikaporo, a sweet rice cake dessert made with combining coconut milk, rice flour and gelatine.
- Pallu butung, iced sweet dessert made from ripe green bananas, shredded ice, condensed milk and syrup. Often consumed as iftar to break the fast during Ramadhan.
- Pisang epe (pressed banana), a banana which is pressed, grilled, and covered with palm sugar sauce and sometimes eaten with Durian. Many street vendors sell Pisang Epe, especially around the area of Losari beach.
- Pisang ijo (green banana), a banana covered with green-colored flours, coconut milk, and syrup. Pisang Ijo is sometimes served iced, also often consumed as iftar to break the fast during Ramadhan.

== Beverages ==
- Sarabba, a traditional warm drink made out of ginger, palm sugar, coconut milk and egg yolk.

== Gallery ==
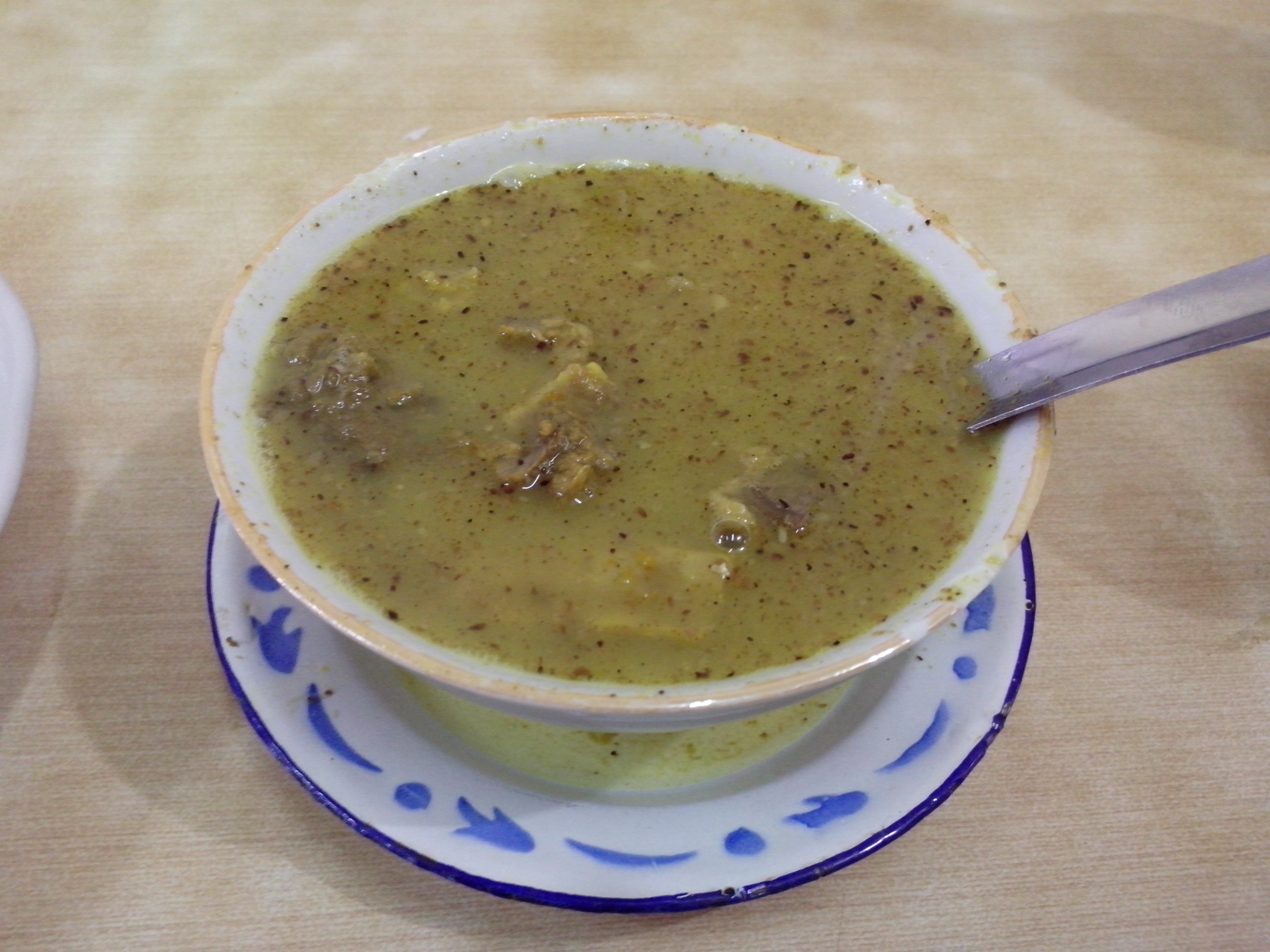
Pallubasa

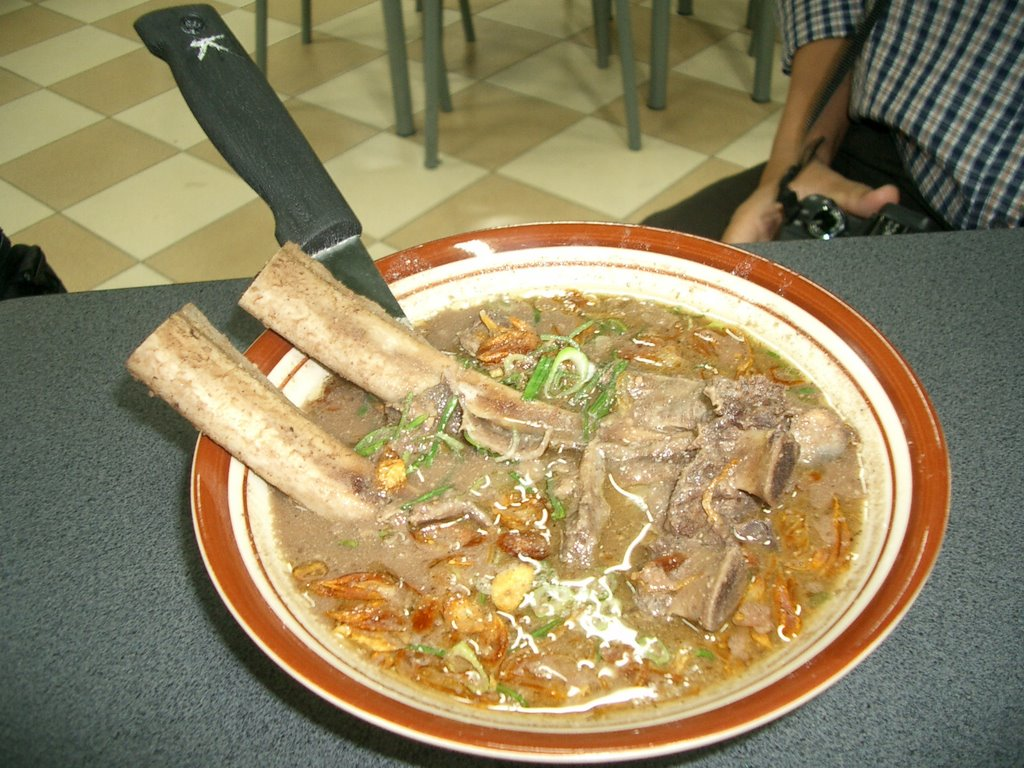
Konro

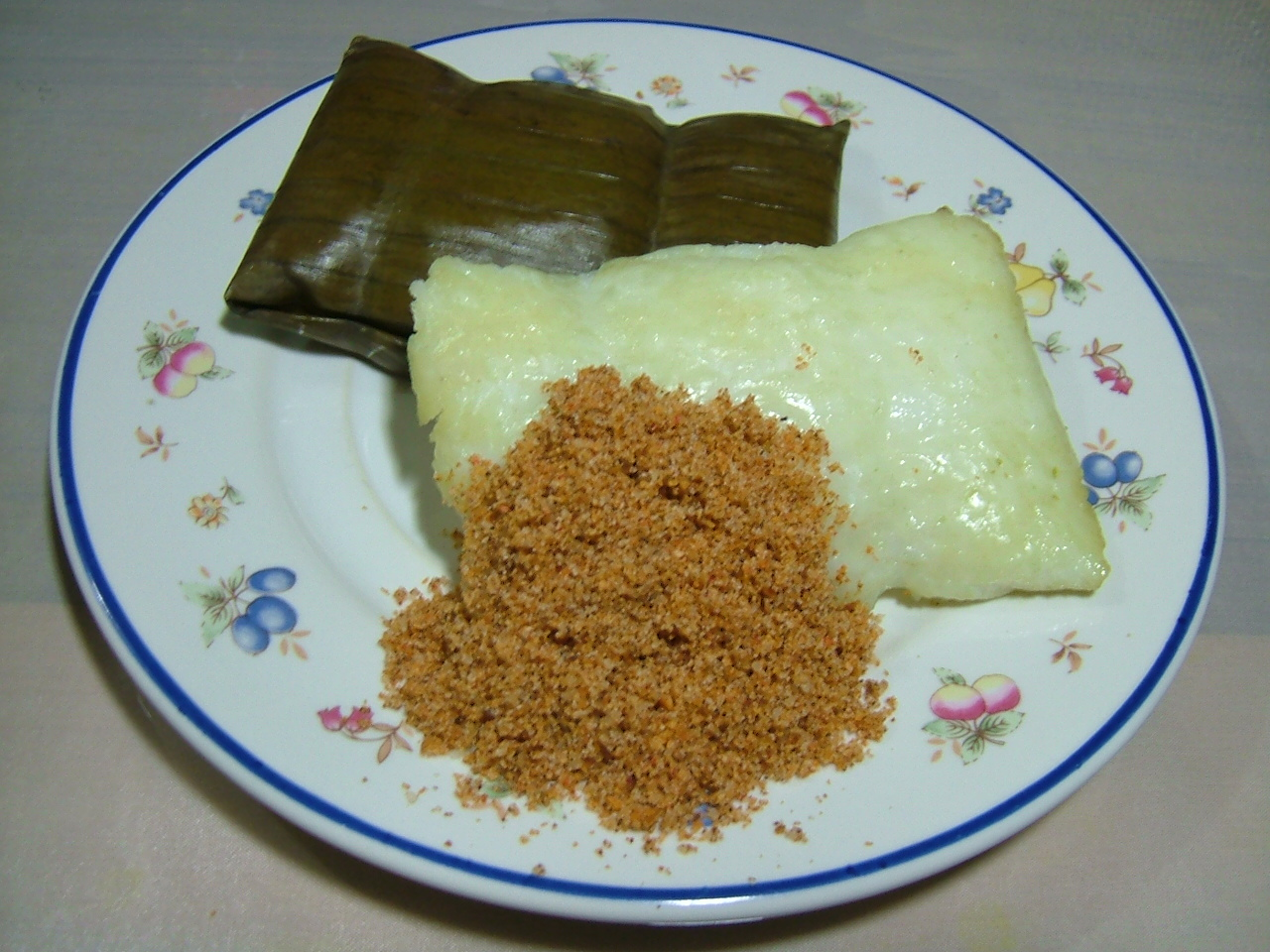
Burasa

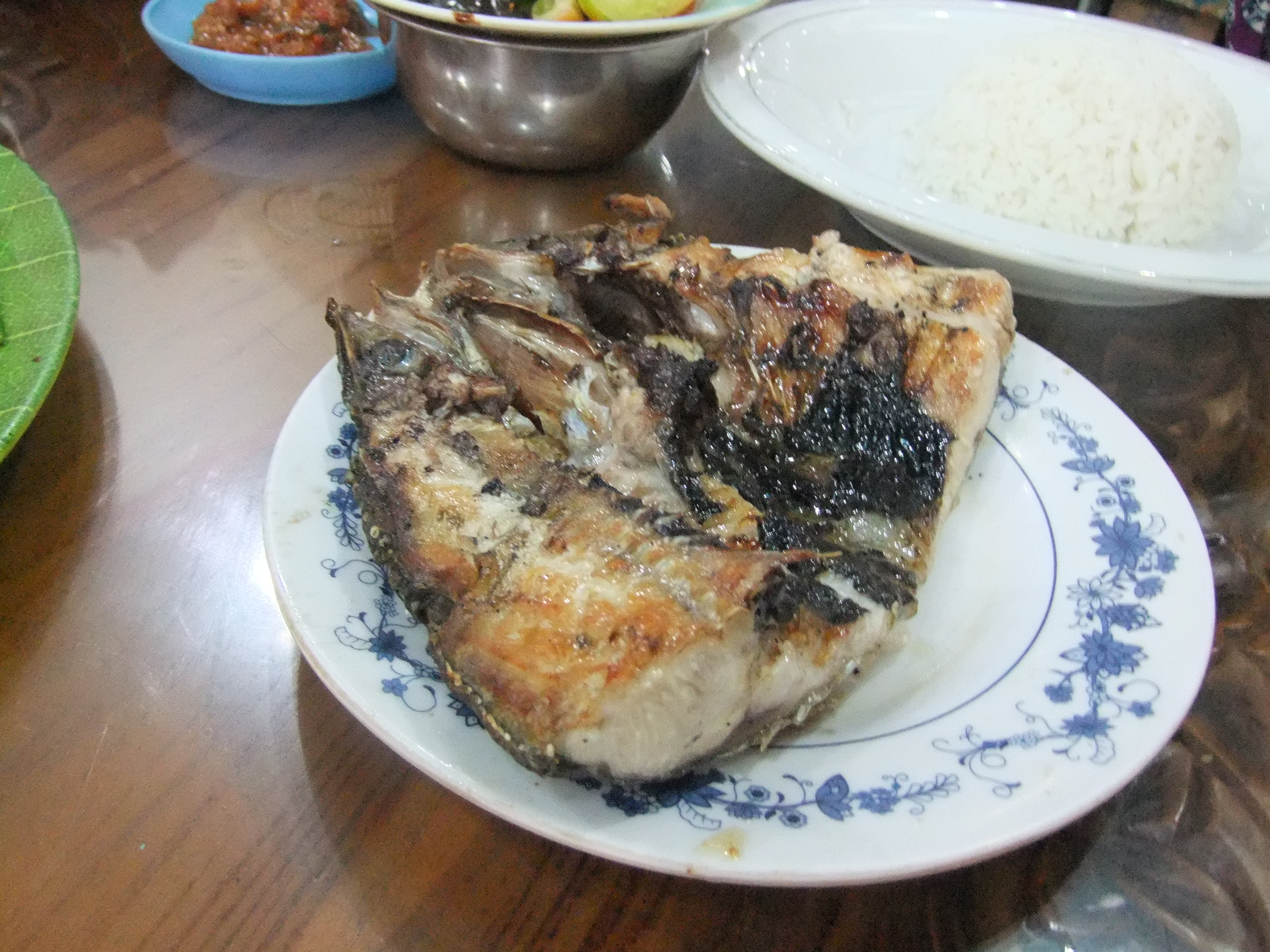
ikan bolu bakar (grilled milkfish)

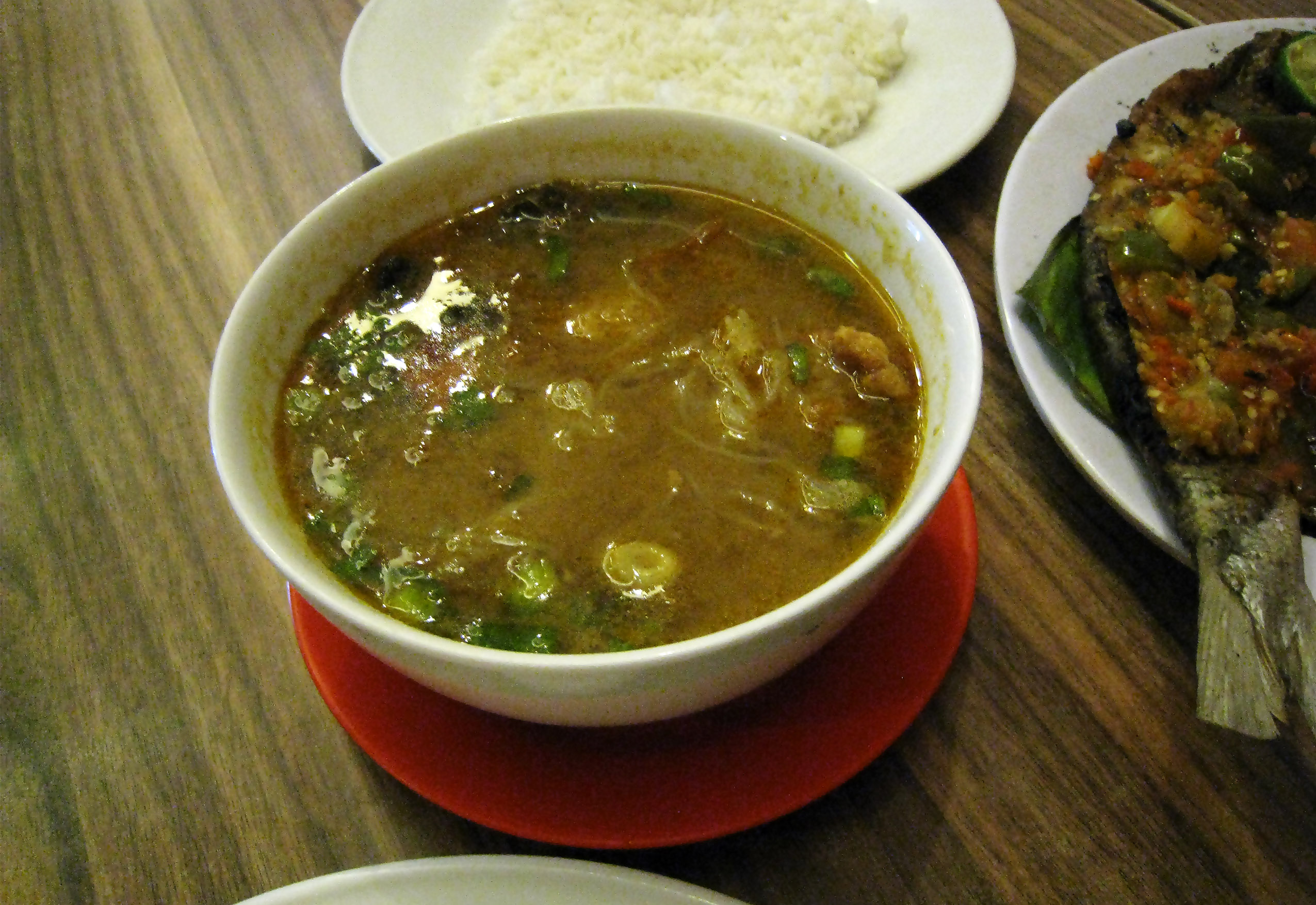
Sop saudara

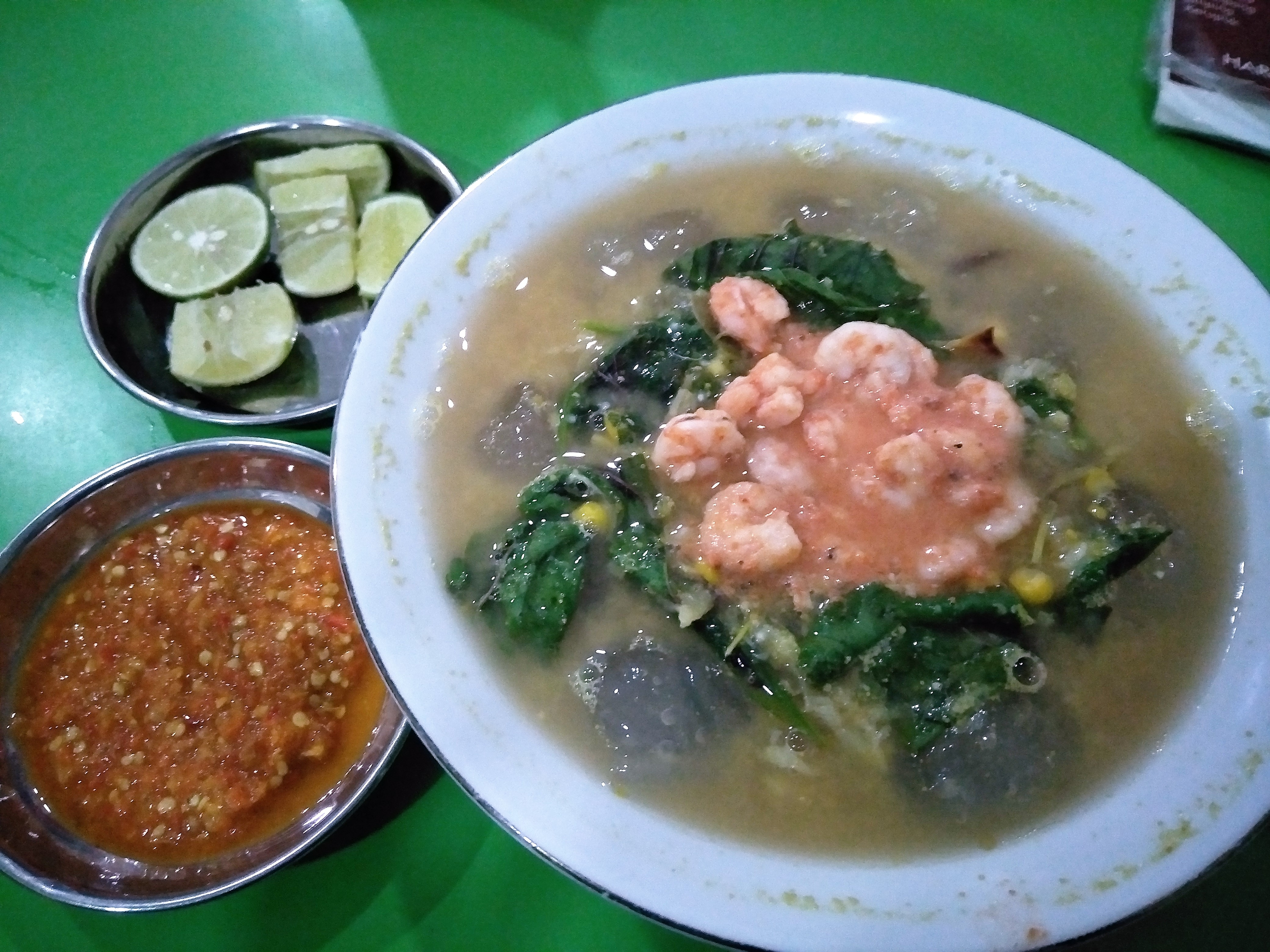
Kapurung

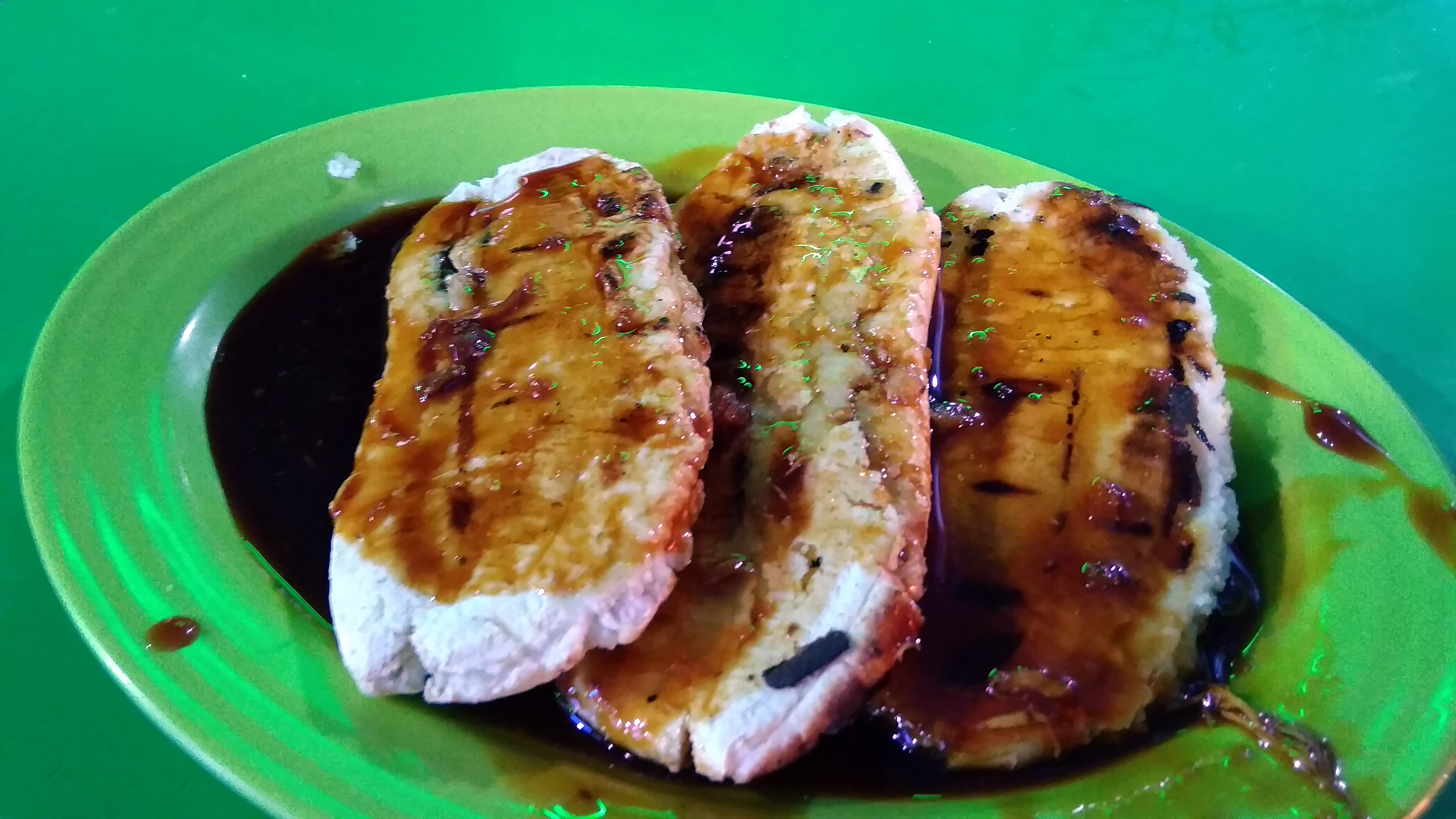
Pisang epe

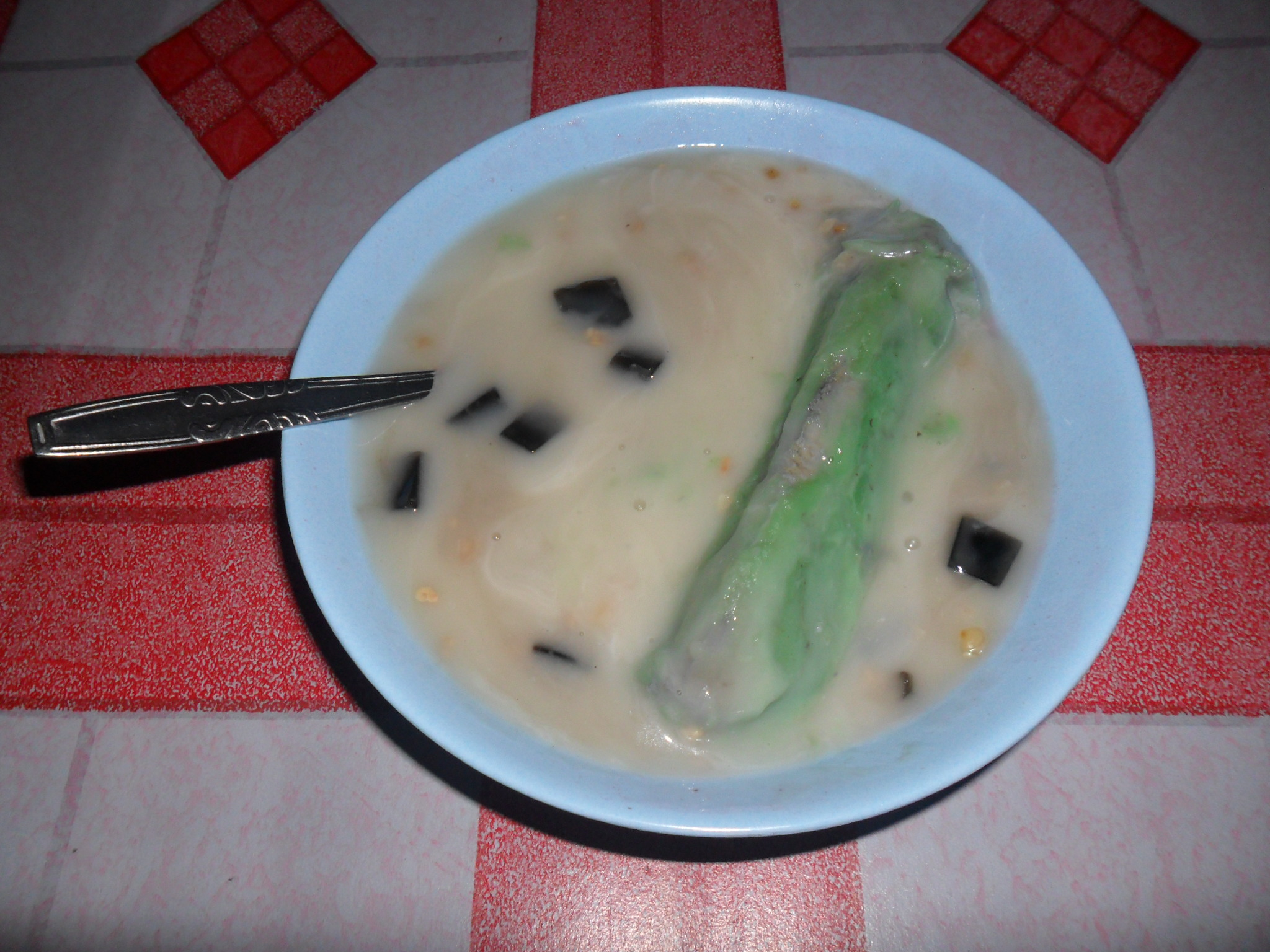
Pisang ijo
