= Mie kering =

Indonesian dried noodle dish

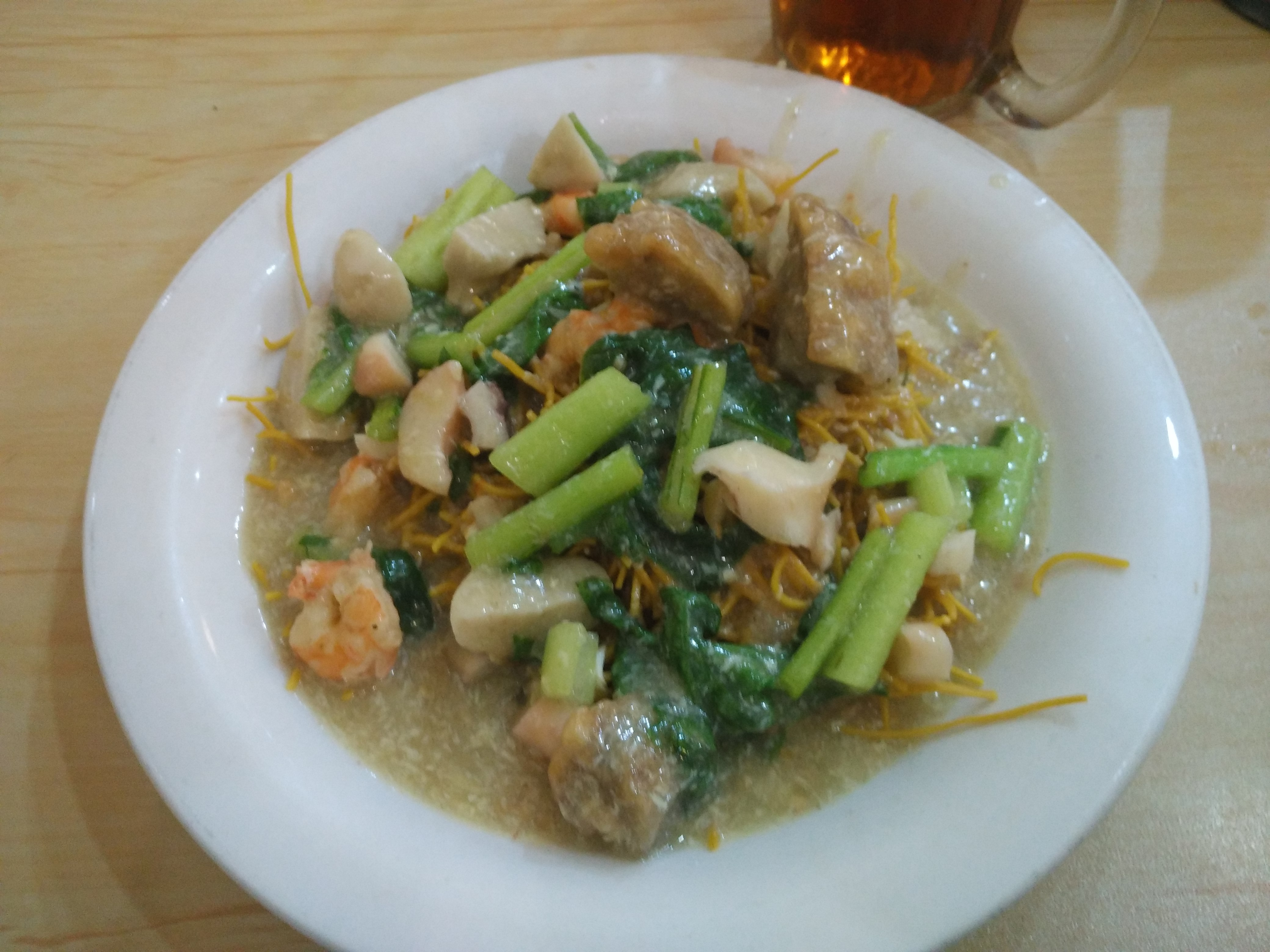
- Mie Kering Makassar
- Type: Noodle
- Course: Main
- Place of origin: Indonesia
- Region or state: Southeast Asia
- Serving temperature: Hot
- Main ingredients: Dried noodle

Mie Kering or Makassar Dried Noodle is a Chinese Indonesian cuisine, a type of dried noodle served with thick gravy and sliced chicken, shrimp, mushrooms, liver, and squid. It is somewhat similar to Chinese I fu mie, only the noodle is thinner.

The recipe was devised by a Chinese descent, Ang Kho Tjao. He opened his noodle shop to sell his dried noodle and it gaining popularity in Makassar since early 1970s. Ang Kho Tjao passed his knowledge of the recipe to his three children namely Hengky, Awa', and Titi. After Ang Kho Tjao died, dried noodle shop business was continued by his three children who separately opened their own shop. Titi's are the most popular in Makassar, hence the name of "Mie Titi" become synonymous with Makassar dried noodle. Mie Kering is one of the most famous Makassar dishes, the others are Coto Makassar and Konro.

== See also ==
- Mie goreng
- Bakmi
