= Serundeng =

Indonesian spiced grated coconut

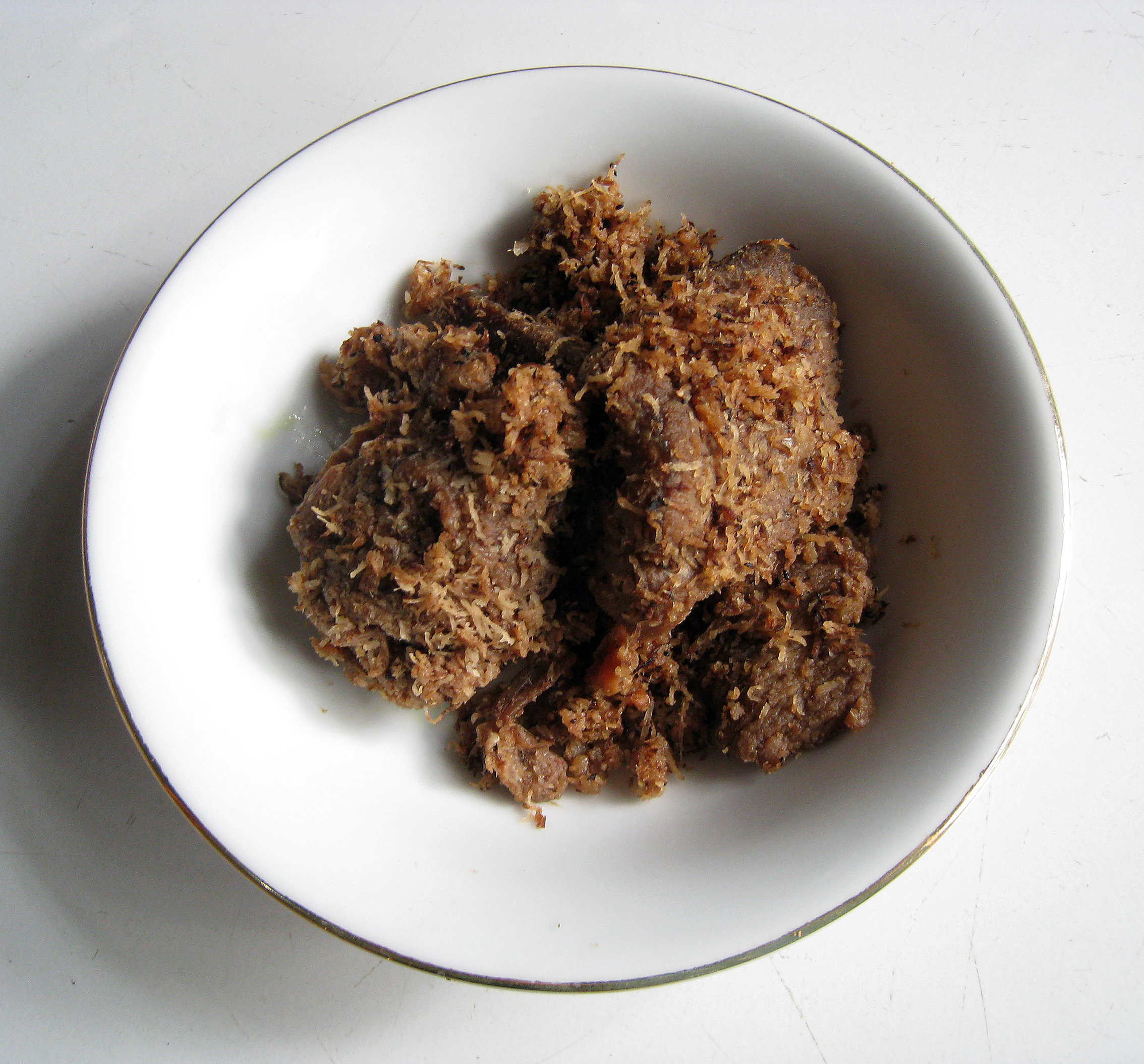
- Serundeng daging, fried beef with spicy sauteed grated coconut
- Course: Main course or snack
- Place of origin: Indonesia
- Region or state: Java
- Serving temperature: Room temperature
- Main ingredients: Grated coconut spiced and sauteed and sprinkled upon another dishes, such as fried beef, soto or ketan (sticky rice)

Serundeng (from Javanese ꦱꦿꦸꦤ꧀ꦢꦺꦁ 'srundèng') refers to a Javanese spiced grated coconut side dish or condiment originated in Indonesia that is used to accompany rice. Serundeng may taste sweet or hot and spicy, according to the recipe variants.

Its best-known variant is an Indonesian preparation of sautéed grated coconut mixed with spice and other ingredients. The spiced shredded toasted coconut can be mixed with peanuts, used as a condiment to add flavour, or used as a garnish sprinkled upon rice-based dishes, such as steamed rice, lontong, ketan sticky rice, and burasa; or upon traditional soto soups.

Serundeng can also be considered a separate dish if mixed with main ingredients, such as serundeng daging, which is fried meat, usually beef, served in this serundeng spiced coconut floss.

== Ingredients ==
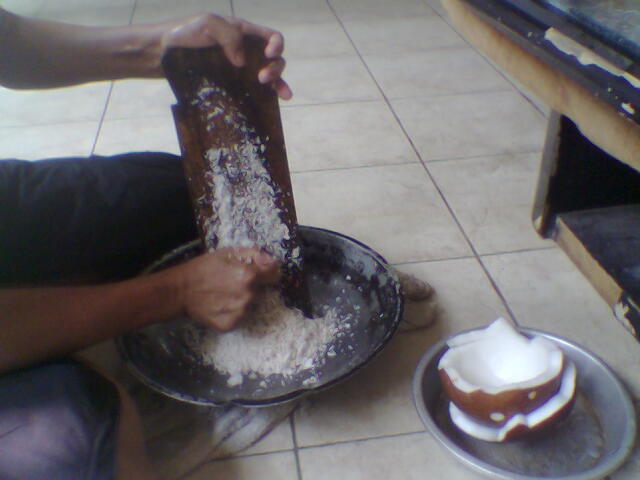
Shredding or grating coconut flesh; it can be made as coconut milk or serundeng.

Grated coconut flesh forms an essential part of serundeng in Indonesian cuisine. Freshly shredded coconut, instead of grated coconut left over from making coconut milk, gives a richer taste. The coconut flesh should be young coconut with a firm texture, and grated to create long pieces. To make serundeng, spices and seasonings like onions, chili peppers, garlic, onion, coriander, turmeric, sugar, tamarind, bay leaves (daun salam), lime leaves (daun jeruk purut), and galangal are ground to a paste, and fried. Then, grated coconut is sauteed (fried with minimal or without oil) until golden brown, and mixed with the seasoning paste. Roasted peanuts might be added for additional crunchy texture and taste.

== Variations ==
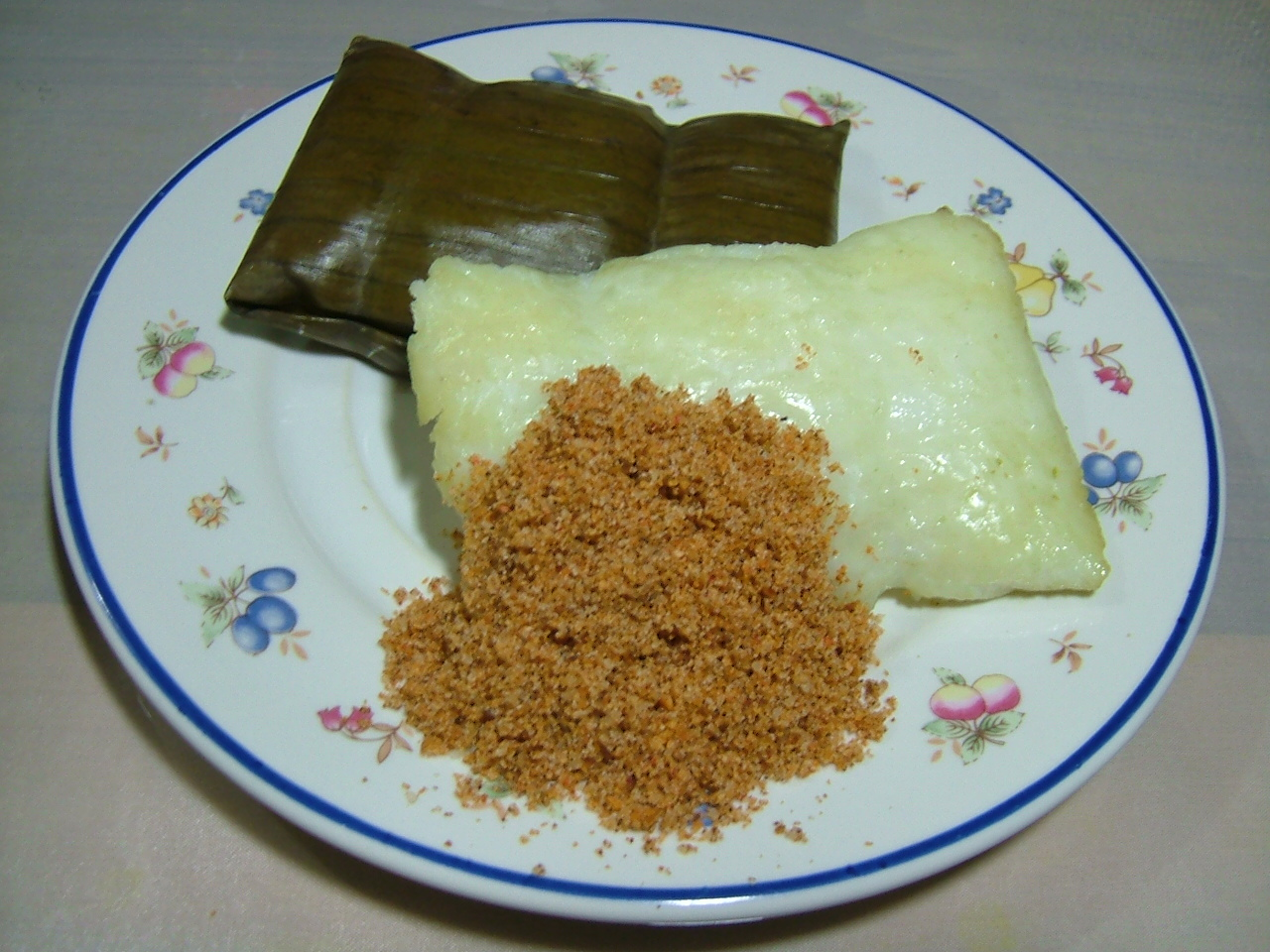
Burasa, rice dumpling cooked in coconut milk wrapped in banana leaf, served with serundeng

Serundeng can be mixed with meat in dishes such as serundeng daging (beef serundeng), sprinkled on top of other dishes such as soto soup, ketupat or covered all over ketan (sticky rice).

In Indonesia, beef serundeng usually tastes rather sweet because of the generous addition of coconut sugar, and it is commonly associated with Javanese cuisine. Serundeng fried coconut flakes as a sprinkled dry condiment is also found in Betawi cuisine of Jakarta, and Makassar cuisine of South Sulawesi, usually applied upon soto, ketan, or burasa (rice cake wrapped in banana leaf and cooked in coconut milk).

In Malaysia, the term serunding refers to meat floss instead, and it can be mixed with grated coconut or not. In Indonesia, meat floss is called abon, and serundeng refers to spiced and sauteed grated coconut.

== See also ==
- Chammanthi podi, chutney made with shredded coconut
- List of coconut dishes
