= Ifumi =

Indonesian noodle dish

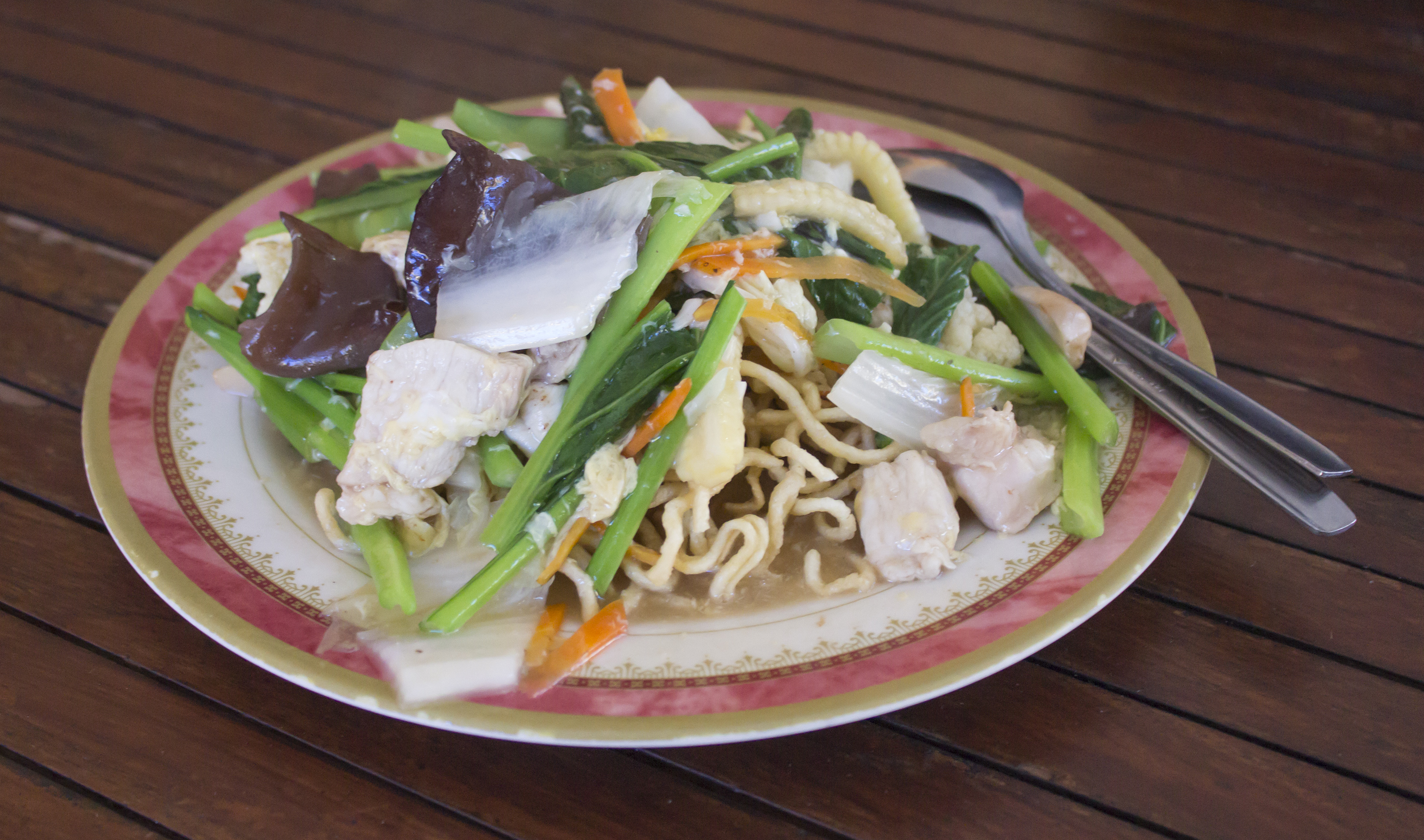
- A plate full of ifumi noodles in Yogyakarta
- Alternative names: I fu mie, ifu mie, yi fu mein
- Course: Main course
- Place of origin: Indonesia
- Region or state: Java
- Serving temperature: Hot
- Main ingredients: Crispy deep-fried noodles with chicken, meat or prawn
- Similar dishes: Mie kering

Ifumi is an Indonesian crispy deep-fried thick noodle dish, popular in Maritime Southeast Asia, served in a thick savoury sauce with pieces of meat or seafood and vegetables. The dishes are to be served hot while the noodles are still crisp until the noodles are softened by the sauce and are ready to be eaten. The dish is one of the most popular noodle dishes in Chinese Indonesian cuisine. The type of noodle being used in this dish is the thick yi mein noodle, hence the origin of its name. It is quite similar to mie kering noodles from Makassar.

== Ingredients ==
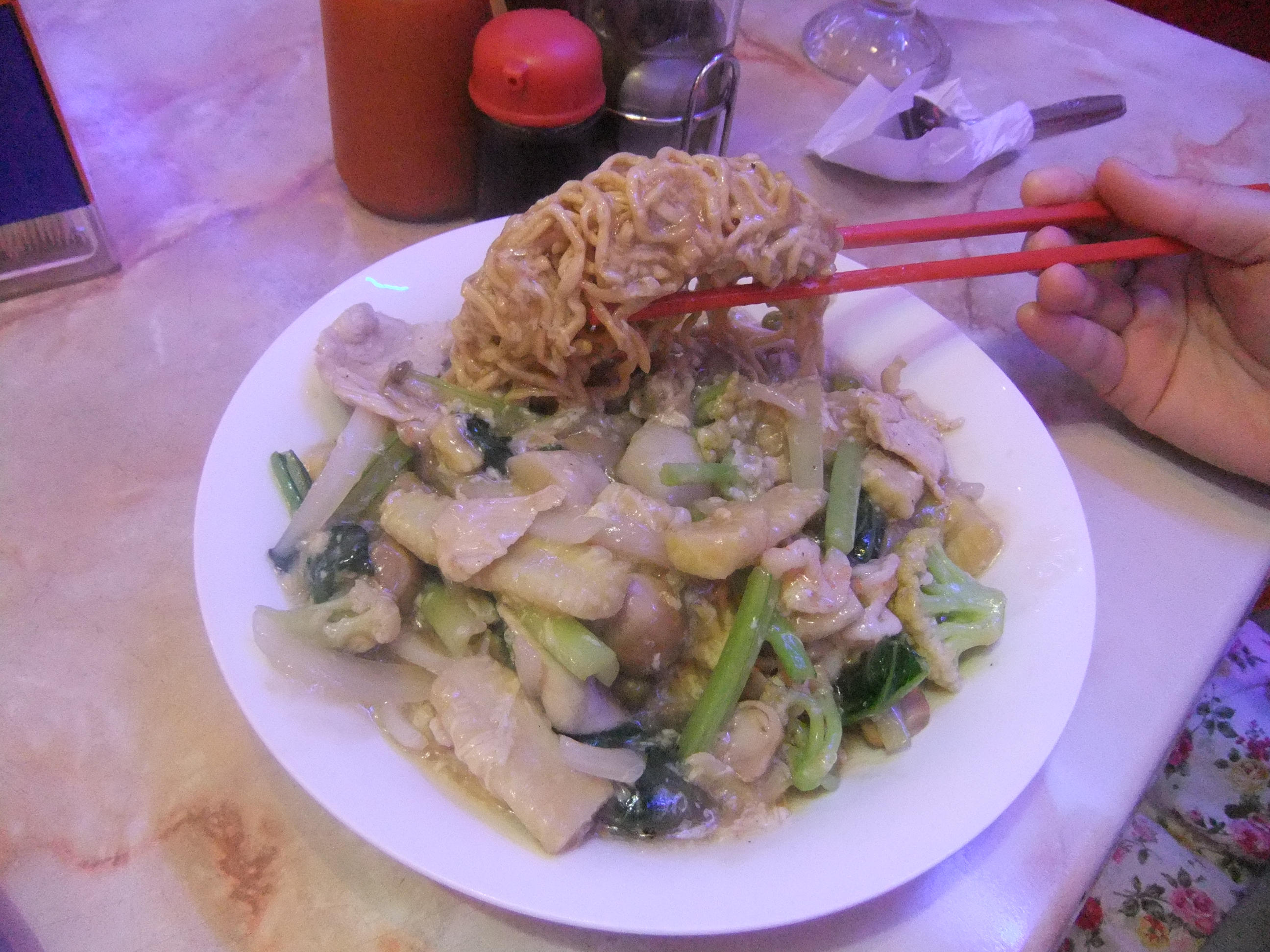
Ifumi ready to eat

Unlike other Chinese Indonesian noodles with a soft texture, such as mie goreng, ifumi has a crispy texture akin to dried instant noodles or crackers. This is because the noodles were deep-fried in palm oil first.

The vegetable sauce is similar to that in the Chinese Indonesian dish cap cai; it is made of stir-fried carrots, cloud ear mushroom, choy sum or napa cabbage, cauliflower, garlic and onion, all seasoned with oyster sauce and ang ciu Chinese cooking wine. The vegetable sauce then has water added to it, and it is mixed with dissolved cornstarch as a thickening agent. This savoury thick sauce with pieces of meat and vegetables is cooked separately, and it is later poured upon the dry crispy noodles prior to serving the dish.

== See also ==
- Indonesian noodles
- Laksa
- Mie kuah
- List of Indonesian dishes
