= Yi mein =

Cantonese noodle dish

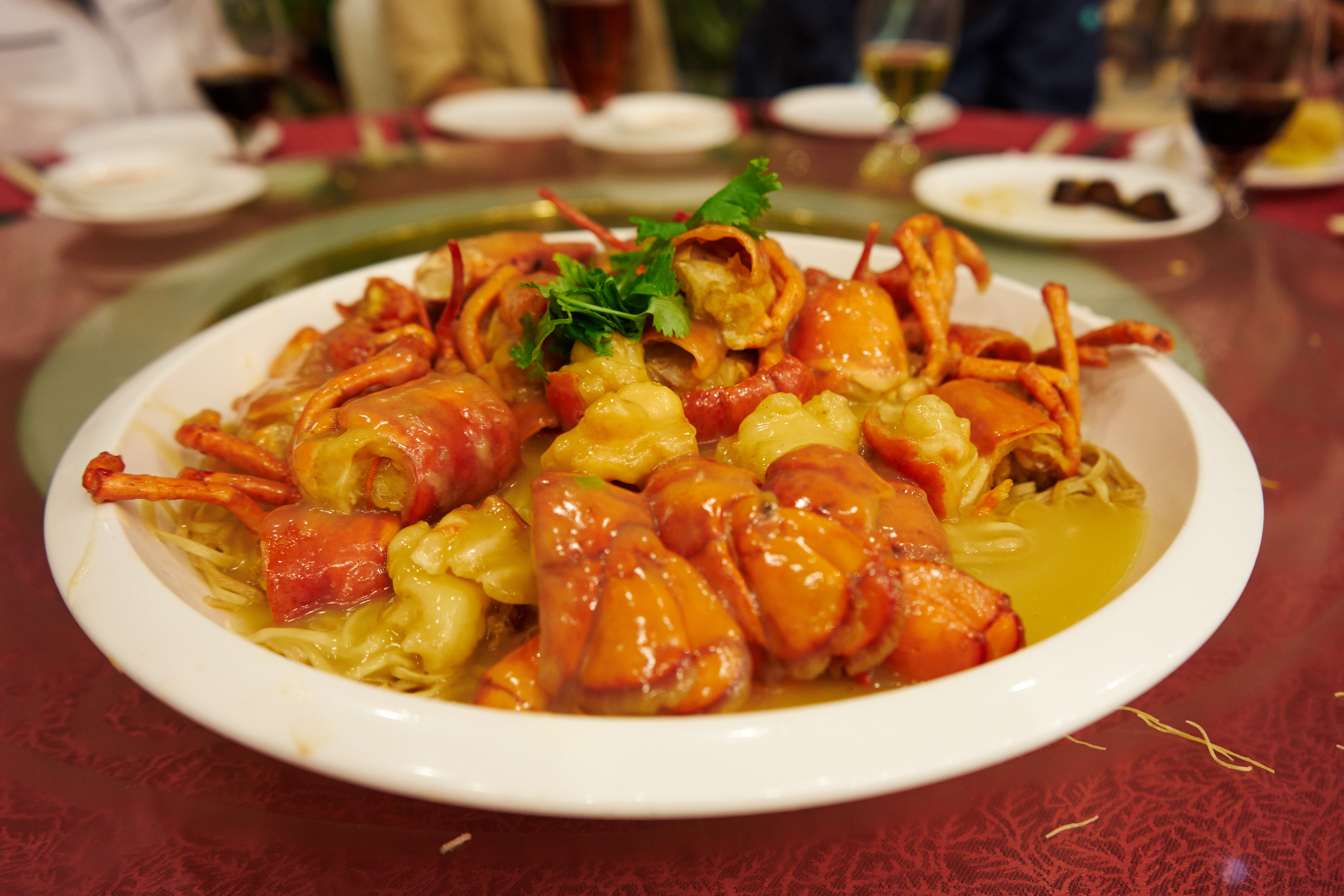
- Lobster with e-fu noodles in Hong Kong
- Alternative names: e-fu noodles, yee-fu noodles, yi noodles, yifu noodles
- Type: Chinese noodles
- Place of origin: China
- Main ingredients: Wheat flour, eggs

yi mein
- Traditional Chinese: 伊麵
- Simplified Chinese: 伊面
Transcriptions
Standard Mandarin
- Hanyu Pinyin: yīmiàn Yī miàn
- Wade–Giles: i-mien I mien
Yue: Cantonese
- Yale Romanization: yī mihn
- Jyutping: ji1 min6
Southern Min
- Hokkien POJ: i-mī

Alternative Chinese name
- Traditional Chinese: 伊府麵
- Simplified Chinese: 伊府面
Transcriptions
Standard Mandarin
- Hanyu Pinyin: Yī fǔmiàn
- Wade–Giles: i-fu-mien I fu-mien
Yue: Cantonese
- Yale Romanization: yī fú mihn
- Jyutping: ji1 fu2 min6
Southern Min
- Hokkien POJ: i-hú-mī

Yi mein or yimian is a variety of flat Cantonese egg noodles made from wheat flour. They are known for their golden brown color and chewy characteristics. The slightly chewy and slightly spongy texture of the noodles is due to the lye water used in making the dough, which is then fried and dried into flat patty-like dried bricks.

== Preparation ==
The yi mein noodles available at grocery stores were pre-cooked by machines the same way as the modern instant noodles are made.

The noodles may be cooked a number of ways. They are boiled first, then can be stir-fried, or used in soups or salads. Good noodles maintain their elasticity, allowing the noodles to stretch and remain chewy.

=== Dishes ===
Yi mein noodles can be consumed directly or used in various dishes:

- Plain yi mein.
- Plain yi mein with Chinese chives (韮黃).
- Dried fried yi mein (乾燒伊麵), often comes with Chinese chives and shiitake mushroom.
- Crab meat yi mein (蟹肉伊麵).
- Lobster yi mein (龍蝦伊麵), sometimes served with cheese in Hong Kong.
- Yi mein with black mushrooms and eggplant.
- Yi mein in soup.
- I fu mie, fried yi mein noodles served in sauce with vegetables, chicken or prawns.

== History ==
Yi mein is traditionally credited to the Qing official Yi Bingshou (t 伊秉綬, s 伊秉绶, Yī Bǐngshòu; 1754–1815), who is taken to be their namesake ("Yi-style noodles") and who is also credited with popularizing Yangzhou fried rice.

== Traditions ==
When yi mein is consumed on birthdays, it is generally referred to as long life or longevity noodles or sau mein (壽麵/寿面). The Chinese character for "long" (長壽麵/长寿面) is also added as a prefix to represent "long life". Usually it is consumed with longevity buns on such occasions.

Yi mein is also a popular Lunar New Year dish. Tradition holds that the chef cannot cut the noodles, and each strand should be eaten whole.

== Gallery ==
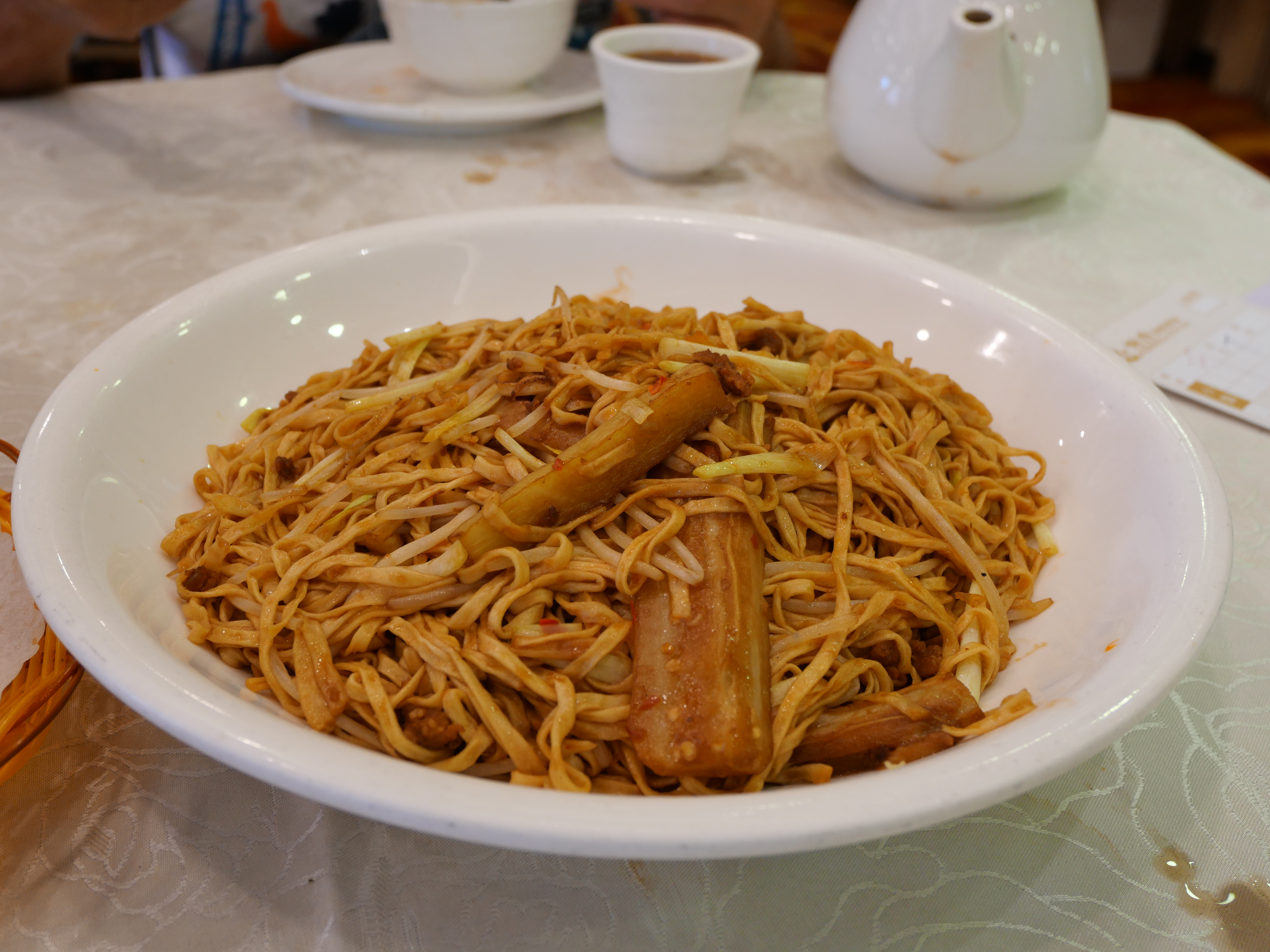
Fisherman-style fried yi mein

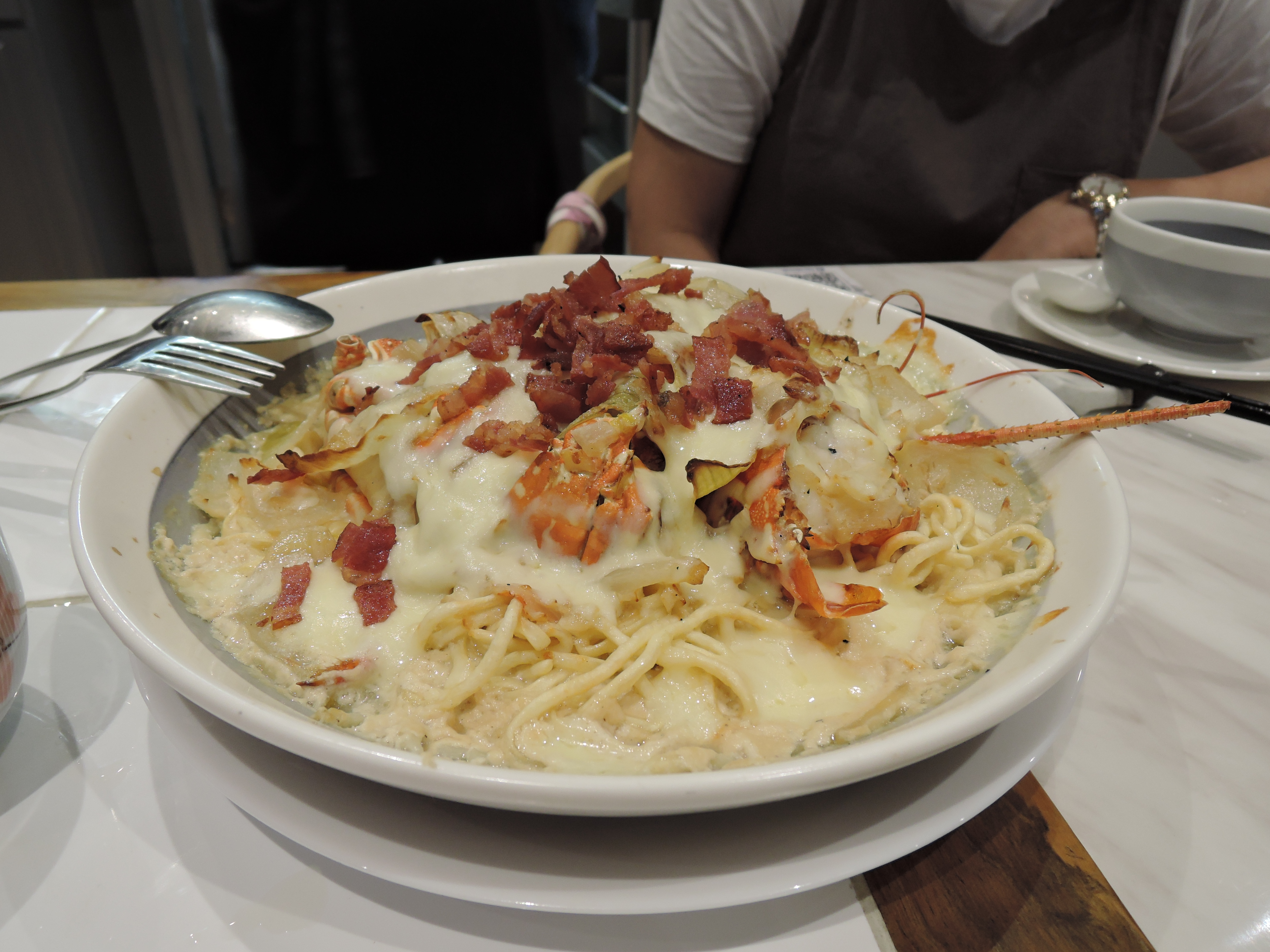
Western- and Chinese-style yi mein with lobster

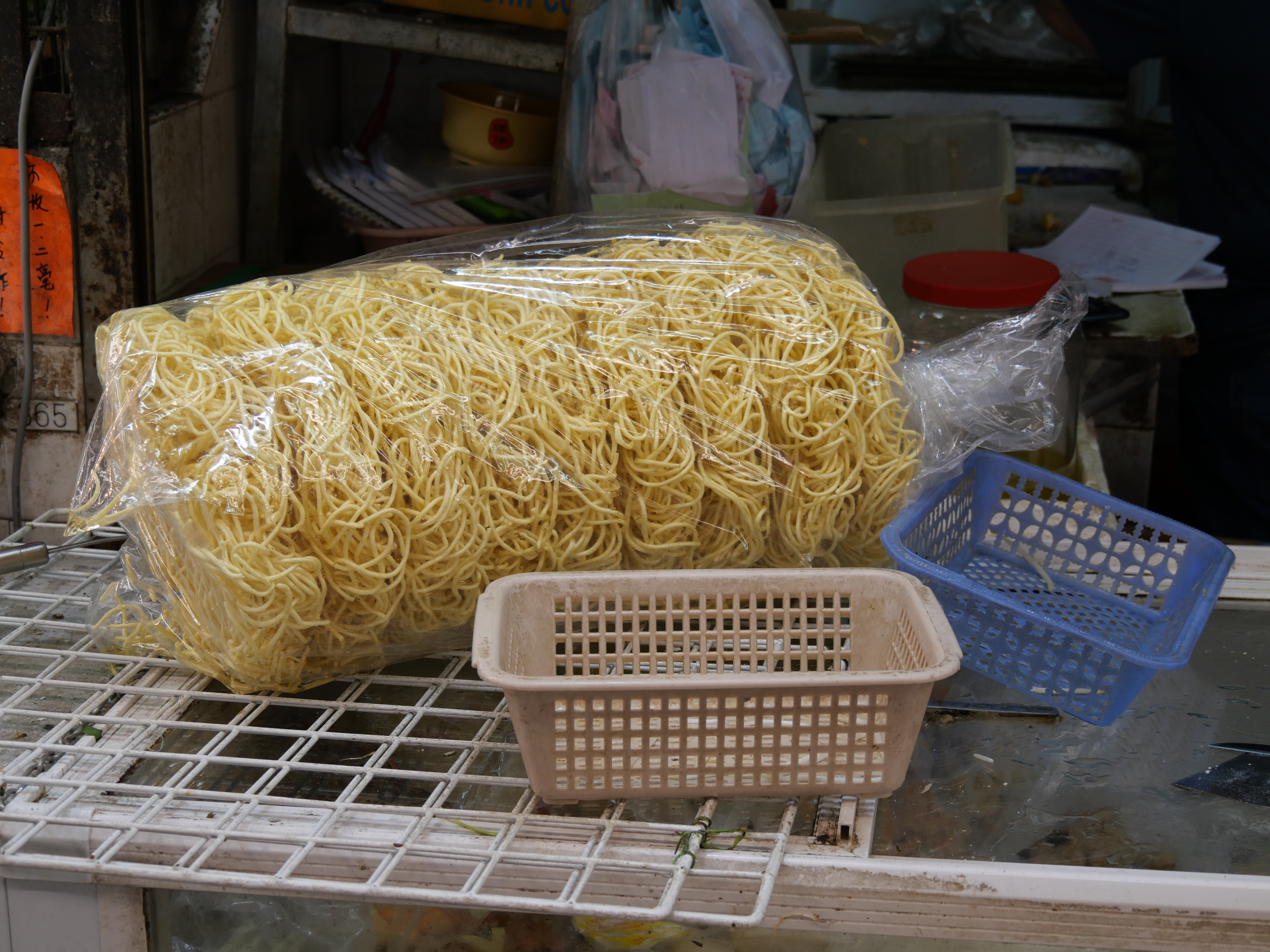
A bag of yi mein at a store in Yuen Long, Hong Kong

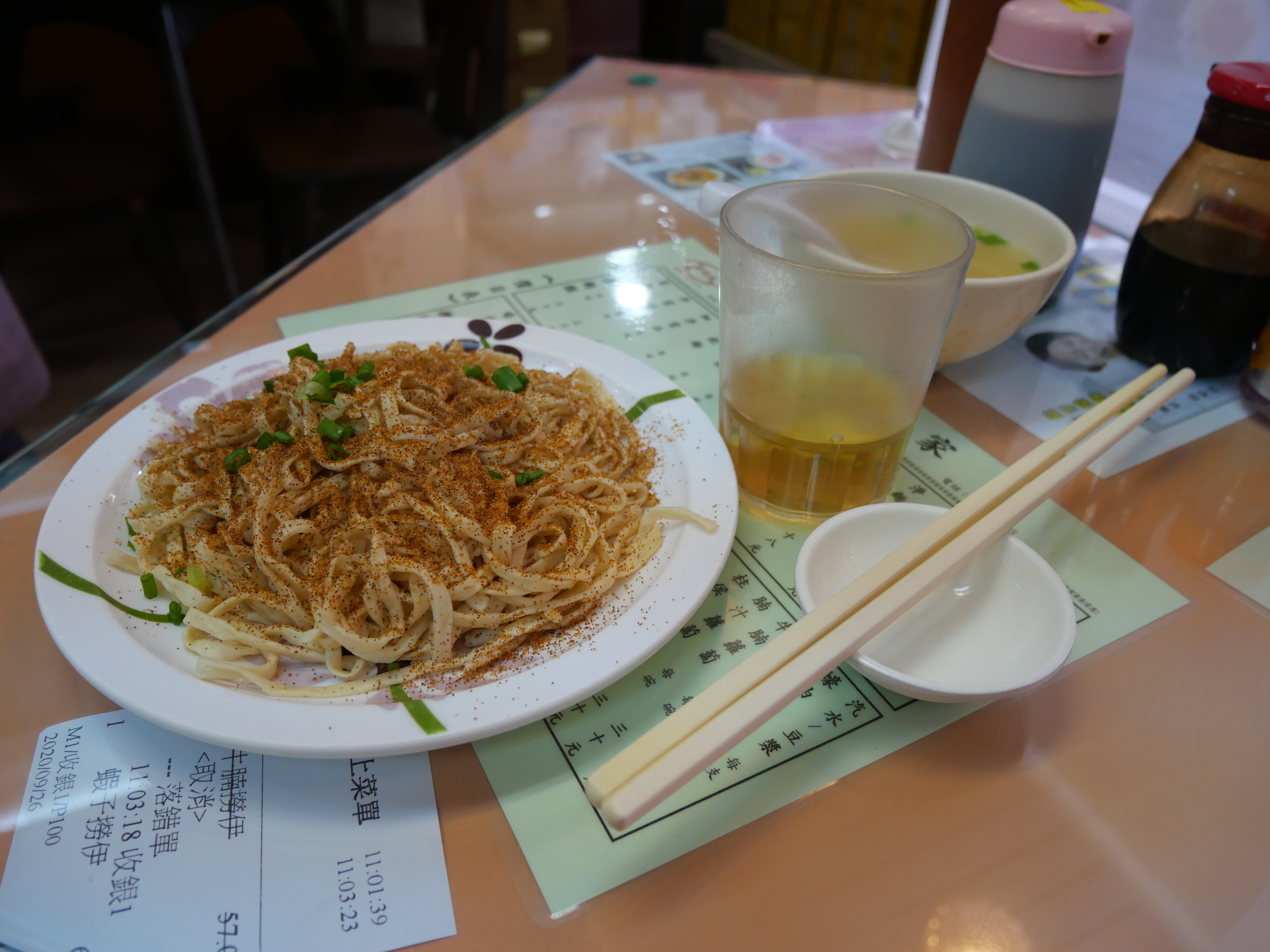
E-fu noodle with ground dried shrimp at a Chinese noodle restaurant in Yuen Long, Hong Kong

== See also ==
- Mì
- Wonton noodles
