= Pallubasa =

Indonesian thin meat stew from South Sulawesi

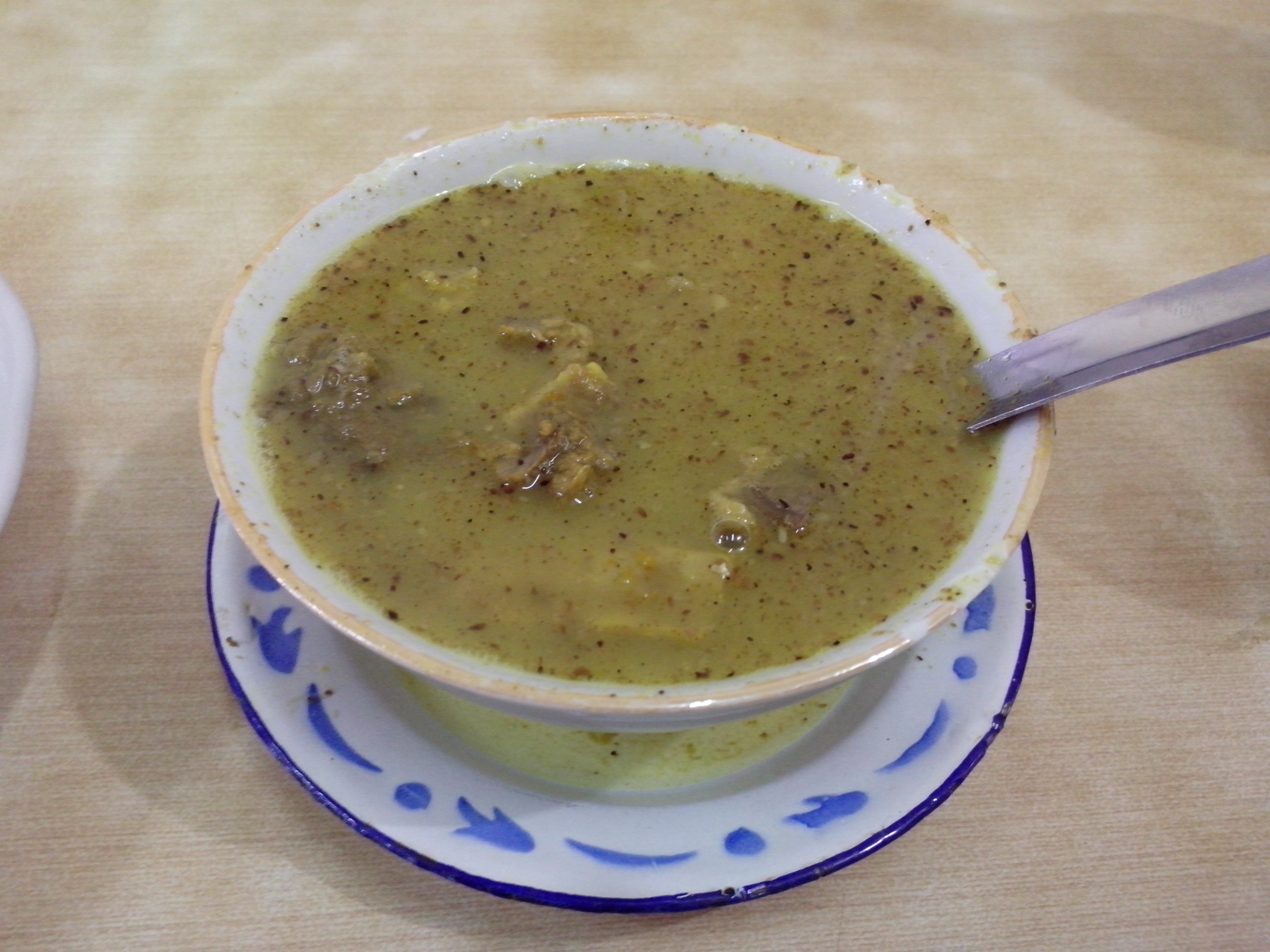
- Pallubasa with beef
- Type: Stew
- Place of origin: Indonesia
- Region or state: South Sulawesi
- Main ingredients: Beef or water buffalo meat, broth and spices

Pallubasa or Pallu basa is a traditional dish from Makassar, South Sulawesi, Indonesia. It is similar to coto Makassar; however, while both are primarily made from offal and/or meat of cattle or buffalo, the meat for pallubasa is cooked longer, and served with a creamy santan and sautéed grated coconut broth in a bowl. Pallubasa may be served with a raw egg (or alas) to make the broth even creamier, and lime juice to add zest to the broth. Unlike coto Makassar, which is eaten with ketupat, pallubasa is eaten with a plate of white rice. It was also eaten with burasa in the past.

Historically, pallubasa contained only offal and/or other unwanted parts of the animal (such as its testicles, intestines, udders, and even its dried blood), making it very cheap and popular among the working class. As its popularity grew, the upper class started enjoying pallubasa with more preferable parts of the meat, such as sirloin or tenderloin.

== See also ==
- Soto
- List of Indonesian soups
