= Kapurung =

Indonesian soup dish

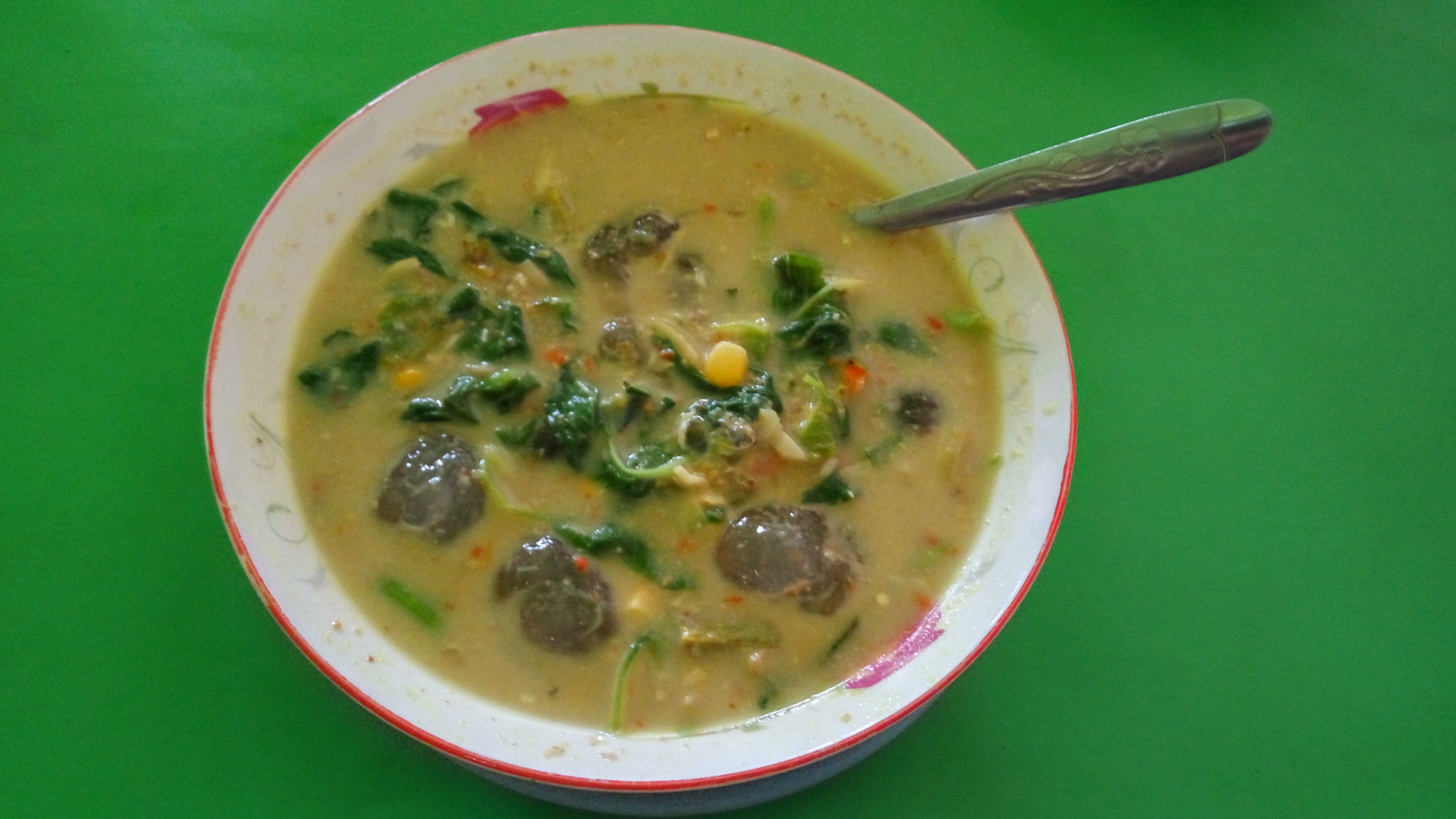
- Alternative names: Pugalu
- Type: Soup
- Place of origin: Indonesia
- Region or state: South Sulawesi
- Main ingredients: Sago, water spinach, shrimp paste, moringa, pindang fish (anchovies) or chicken, vegetables, spices (cayenne pepper), lime, coconut milk

Kapurung (Tae': pugalu) is a dish from South Sulawesi, especially the Luwu region.

This food is made from sago essence or flour. Kapurung is cooked with a mixture of fish or chicken meat and various vegetables.

== See also ==
- Papeda, a typical dish from Papua and Maluku
- Ambuyat, a typical dish from Brunei, Sabah, and Sarawak
