= Sop saudara =

Traditional Indonesian soup

Sop Saudara
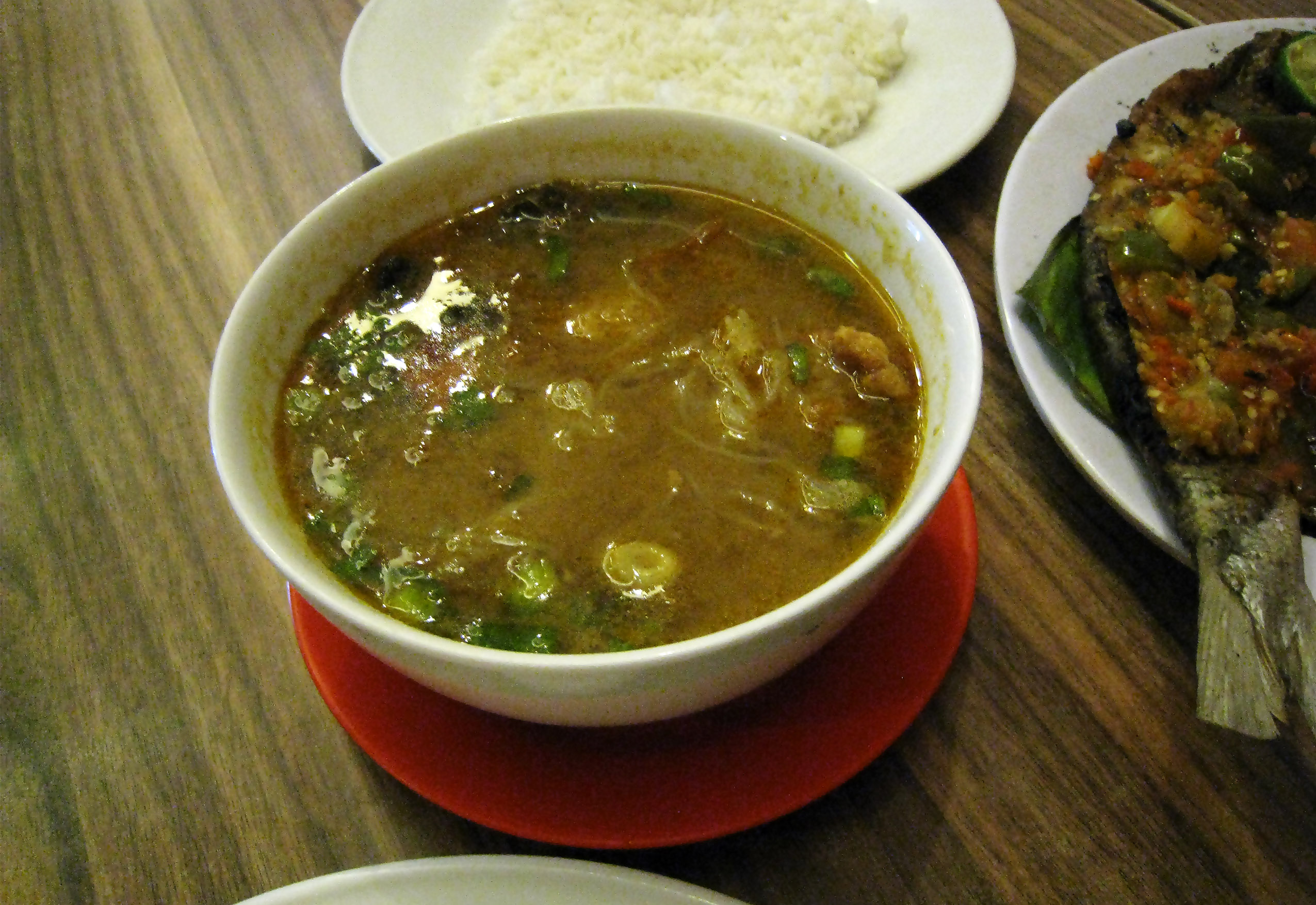
- A bowl of sop saudara
- Alternative names: Sop Sodara
- Course: Main
- Place of origin: Indonesia
- Region or state: Makassar, South Sulawesi
- Created by: Haji Dollahi
- Serving temperature: Hot
- Main ingredients: Beef or buffalo meat, cow's lung, rice vermicelli, perkedel, ginger, galangal, lime leaf, lemongrass, nutmeg, cinnamon

Sop saudara is an Indonesian beef or buffalo soup specialty from Makassar city, South Sulawesi. The soup is commonly served with steamed rice and ikan bolu bakar (grilled milkfish).

== Ingredients ==
Sop saudara is a richly spiced soup that contains bits of beef or buffalo meat and its offal (usually fried cow's lungs), rice vermicelli, perkedel (fried potato patty), and hard boiled egg. The soup is made from a rich beef stock, spiced with a mixture of ingredients. These ingredients include garlic, shallot, candlenut, coriander, caraway, ginger, galangal, lime leaf, lemongrass, nutmeg, and cinnamon. Garnishings include chopped scallion and bawang goreng (crispy fried shallot).

== Origin ==
Sop Saudara was created by Haji Dollahi, who previously worked for Haji Subair, a prominent Coto Makassar seller in Makassar during the 1950s. Both individuals originated from a town in Pangkajene Islands Regency (Pangkajene Kepulauan or Pangkep) and were engaged in selling traditional meat soup.

In 1957, after three years of working for Haji Subair, Haji Dollahi established his own business. His first stall was located in the Karebosi area of Makassar. The name "sop saudara" (meaning "brotherly soup") was inspired by the *warung* name coto paraikatte, which sold Coto Makassar. In the Makassar dialect, paraikatte means "relative," "fellow," or "kin," and the name was chosen to convey a sense of brotherhood among customers.

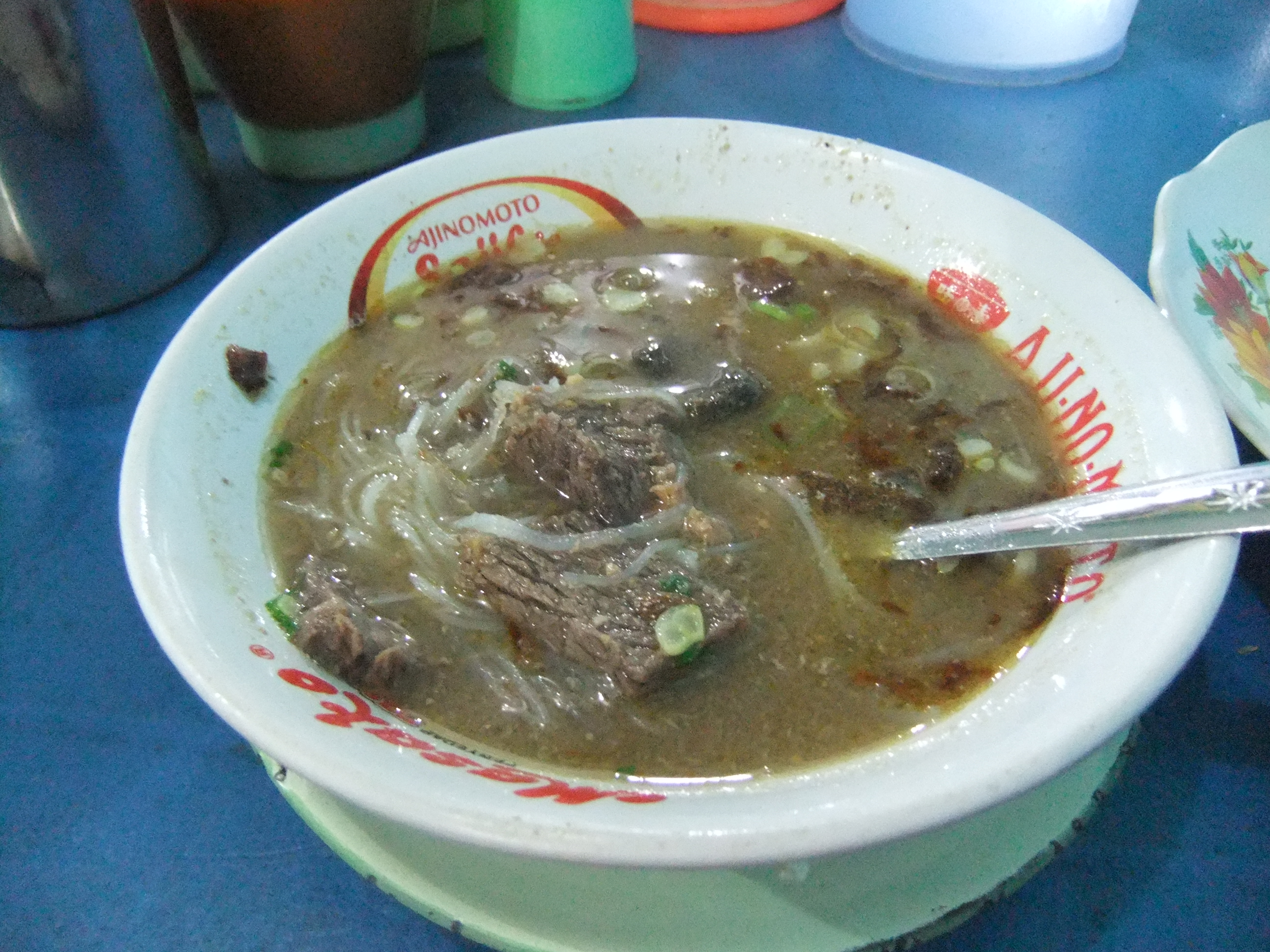
Sop saudara served with buffalo meat

== See also ==
- Coto Makassar
- Konro, Bugis-Makassar spicy cow's ribs soup, similar or related to ribs soto
- List of Indonesian soups
- List of soups
