= Burasa =

Indonesian rice dumpling

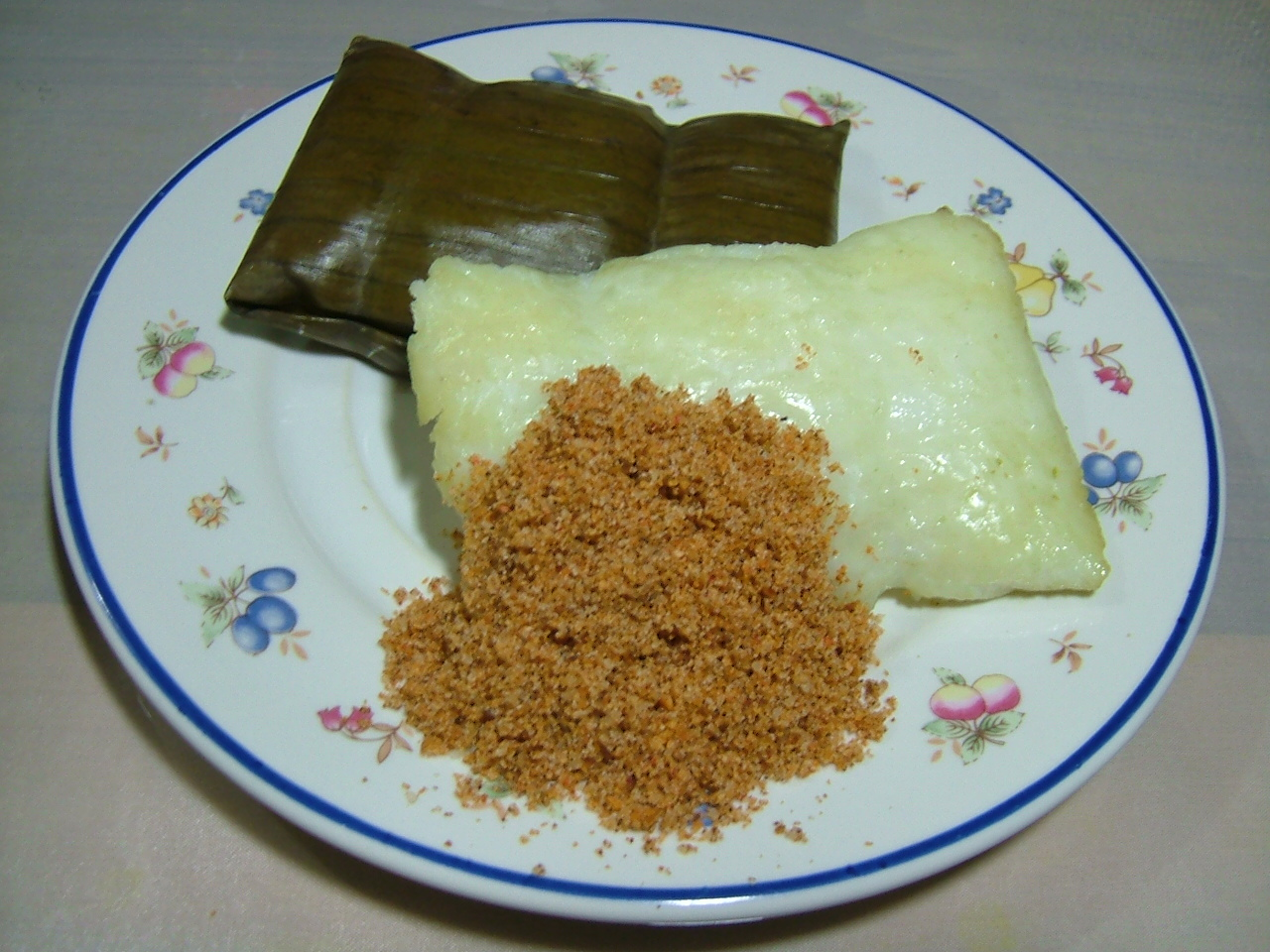
- Burasa, served with serundeng
- Alternative names: Buras, burasa', burasak
- Type: Dumpling
- Place of origin: Indonesia
- Region or state: South Sulawesi
- Associated cuisine: Indonesia, and Malaysia
- Main ingredients: Rice, coconut milk, serundeng

Burasa (['bu:rasaʔ]) (also burasa, burasak or buras) is an Bugis rice dumpling, cooked with coconut milk packed inside a banana leaf pouch. It is similar to lontong, but with a richer flavour acquired from the coconut milk. It is a delicacy of the Bugis and Makassar people of South Sulawesi. It is also a dish associated with the Bugis diaspora, notably in the Malaysian states of Johor, Selangor, Sabah, and Sarawak where there are large established communities. It is often consumed as a staple to replace steamed rice or ketupat, and a popular accompaniment to a rich dish of chicken braised with galangal (ayam masak lengkuas in Malay, likku or lekku in Buginese).

Burasa is made by steaming the rice until half-cooked, then cooking further in coconut milk mixed with daun salam (Indonesian bay leaf) and salt until all of the coconut milk is absorbed into the rice. Then the half-cooked coconut milk rice is wrapped inside banana leaves in cylindrical or pillow shapes, secured with strings, most commonly from banana leaf fibers. Two cylinders of burasa are usually tied together as one. The rice packages are then steamed further until completely cooked.

In Indonesia, burasa can be consumed as a snack with serundeng (spiced desiccated coconut), hard-boiled egg, or sambal kacang (spicy peanut sauce). Bugis and Makassar people often consumed burasa as a replacement to steamed rice or ketupat, usually accompanied with coto Makassar, konro, pallubasa, or lekku. They also often took burasa as food provisions or rations during sailing or travelling.

== See also ==
- Ketupat
- Lemper
- List of steamed foods
- Lontong
- Suman
