= Konro =

Indonesian rib soup dish

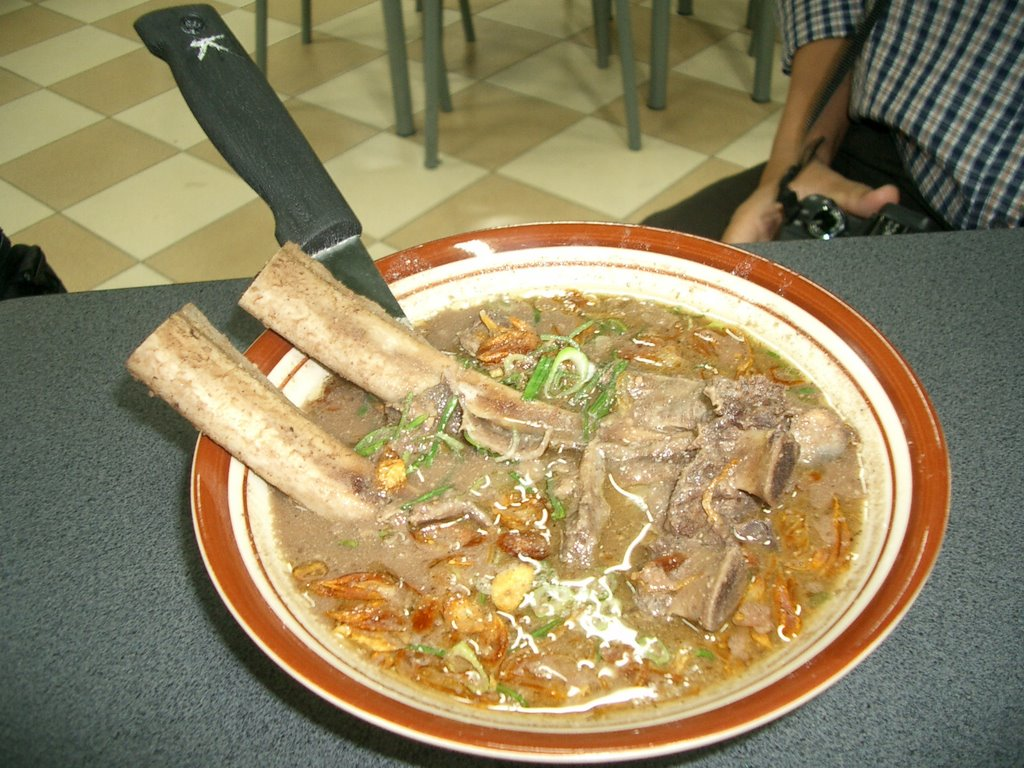
- Konro soup
- Course: main course
- Place of origin: Indonesia
- Region or state: Makassar, South Sulawesi
- Serving temperature: hot
- Main ingredients: Beef ribs, coriander, pangium edule
- Variations: Grilled konro

Konro is an Indonesian rib soup originating with the Makassarese people of South Sulawesi. Usually this soup was made with ribs, such as spareribs or beef as main ingredient. The soup is brown-black in color and eaten either with burasa or ketupat cut into bite-size pieces or rice. The spicy and strong-tasting soup is made from a mixture of rich spices, which includes coriander, keluwak (Pangium edule); a fruit that gives it its blackish color, also small amount of nutmeg, turmeric, galangal, cinnamon, tamarind, lemongrass, clove, and salam (Indonesian bayleaf).

== Variants ==
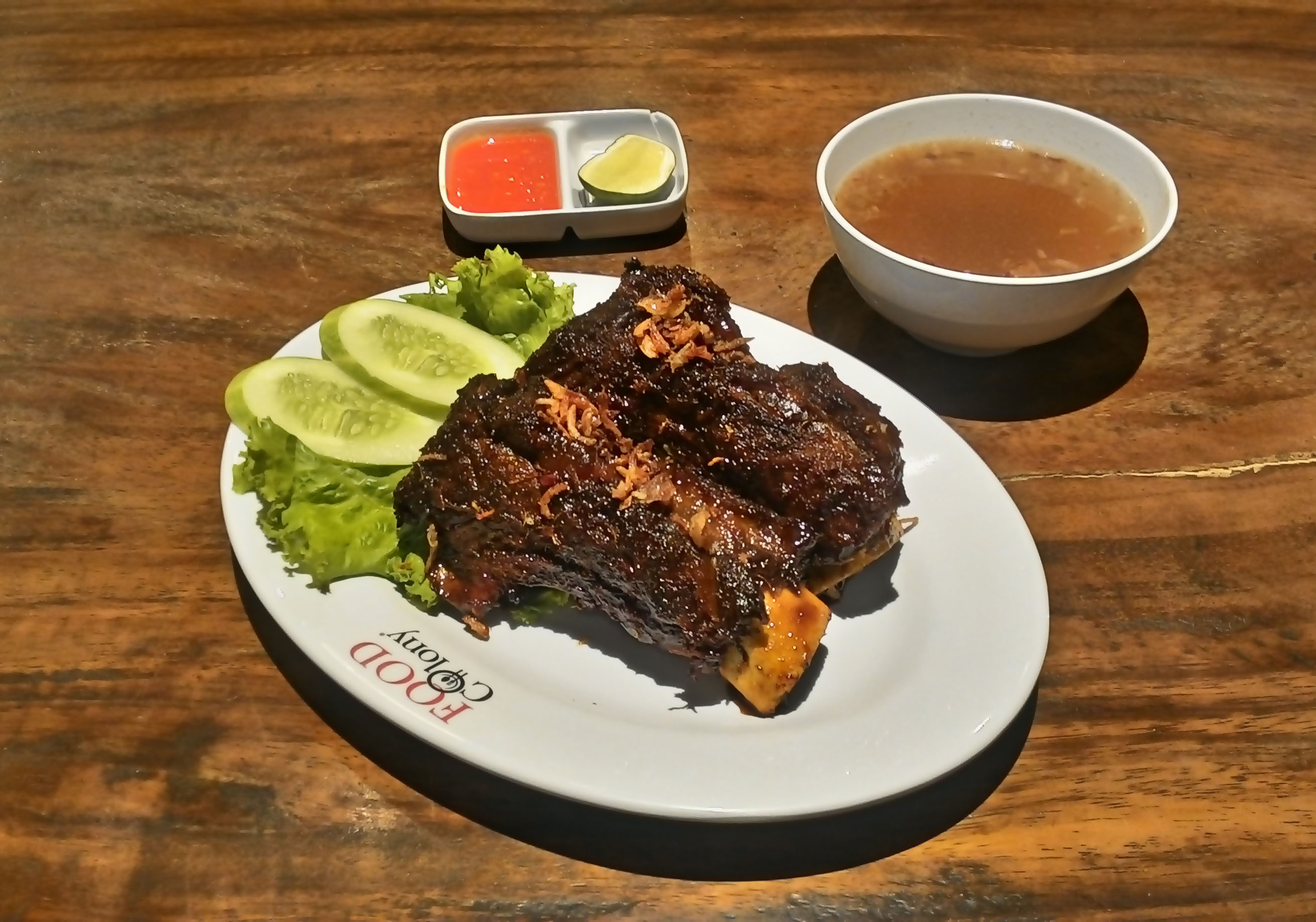
Konro bakar, a variant of konro which is spiced beef ribs

Originally konro was usually served as a spicy rich soup, however today the new variation of dry konro is available, the konro bakar (grilled konro), grilled ribs marinated and coated in spices typical to the konro soup.

== See also ==
- List of Indonesian soups
- Coto Makassar
- Sop saudara
