= Coto makassar =

Traditional Indonesian meat soup

Coto Makassar
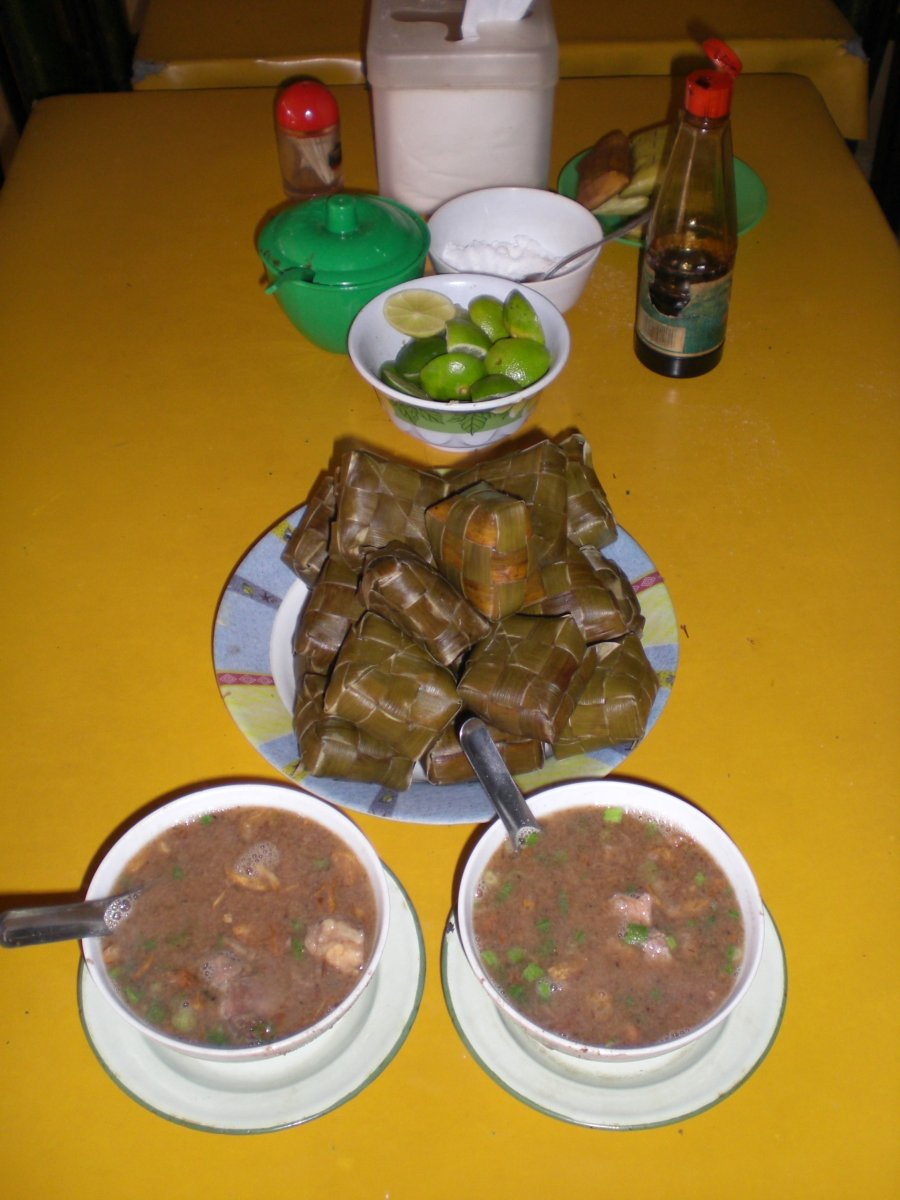
- Coto Makassar with Ketupat
- Type: Stew
- Place of origin: Indonesia
- Region or state: South Sulawesi
- Main ingredients: Beef, broth made from ground peanuts

Coto Makassar or Coto Mangkasara (Makassarese), is an Indonesian traditional soup originating from Makassar, South Sulawesi. It is a variant of soto, traditionally made with beef, offal stew with seasoned broth made from ground peanuts and spices. The main ingredient of this soup is beef, and it can be mixed with innards, such as intestine, liver, lungs, heart, tripe, or cow brain. The spices are used both for flavouring, and to balance the richness of the meat.

The soup originates in the 16th-century in the Sultanate of Gowa, and was originally cooked for royal servants and soldiers. While it is now eaten regularly as a breakfast food in the region, it retains an association with weddings and religious celebrations.

Coto Makassar is usually served with Burasa or Ketupat rice cakes and Tauco sauce, a savoury fermented soybean paste. The use of Tauco indicates that the dish is influenced by Chinese Indonesian cuisine, and the use of Indian curry spices, imported peanuts and halal meat point to the cultural diversity of Makassar during the Gowa period.

== See also ==
- Soto ayam
- Sop saudara, spicy Bugis-Makassar beef soup.
- Konro, Bugis-Makassar spicy cow's ribs soup, similar or related to ribs soto
- Tongseng, Javanese spicy mutton soup also related to soto
- Gulai, the Javanese gulai is soupy, similar to mutton or goat soto but slightly different in spices
- List of Indonesian soups
- List of soups
