= Tofu =

Soy-based food used as a protein source

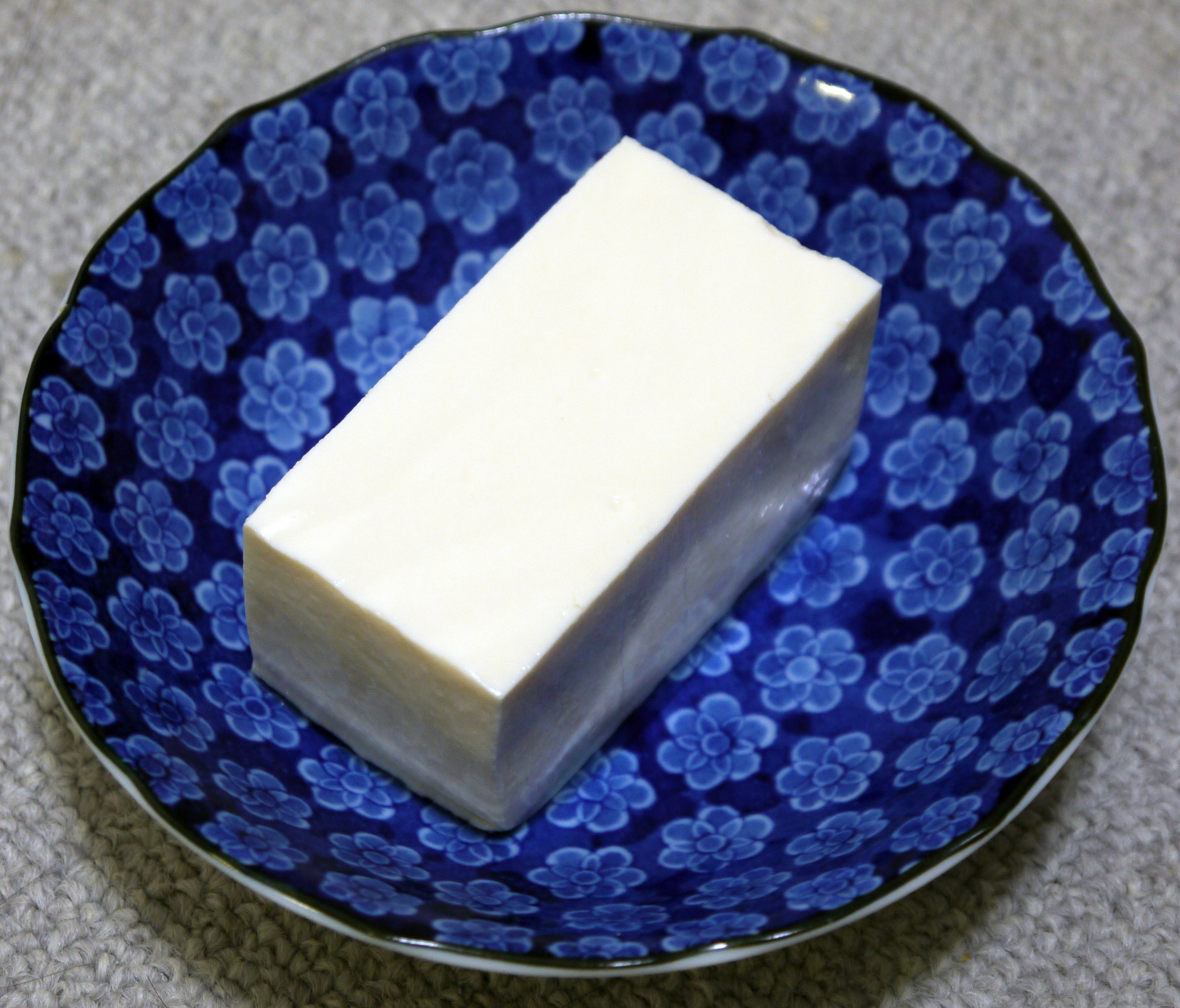
- A typical block of raw Japanese-style silken tofu.
- Alternative names: Bean curd
- Place of origin: China
- Associated cuisine: East Asian and Southeast Asian cuisine; Chinese; Japanese; Ryukyuan; Korean; Filipino; Indonesian; Malaysian; Singaporean; Thai; Vietnamese
- Main ingredients: Soy milk

Tofu (Japanese: 豆腐, Hepburn: tōfu; Chinese: 豆腐; pinyin: dòufu; Korean: 두부; RR: dubu) or bean curd is a food prepared by pressing the curds of coagulated soy milk into solid white blocks of varying softness: 'silken', 'soft', 'firm', and 'extra (or super) firm'.

It originated in China and has been consumed for over 2,000 years. Tofu is a traditional component of many East Asian and Southeast Asian cuisines; in modern Western cooking, it is commonly used as a meat substitute.

Nutritionally, tofu is low in calories, while providing a rich source of protein. Cultivation of soybeans has one of the lowest needs for land use (1.3 m^{2}/ 1000 kcal) and emits some of the lowest amounts of greenhouse gas emissions per gram of edible protein of any food (1.6 kg CO_{2}/ 100 g protein).

== Etymology ==
The English word "tofu" comes from Japanese tōfu (豆腐, see below), which in turn borrows Chinese 豆腐 (Mandarin: dòufǔ or tòufu) 'bean ferment'.

The earliest documentation of the word in English is in the 1704 translation of Domingo Fernández Navarrete's A Collection of Voyages and Travels, that describes how tofu was made. The word towfu also appears in a 1770 letter from the English merchant James Flint to Benjamin Franklin. The term "bean curd(s)" for tofu has been used in the United States since at least 1840.

== History ==
Tofu making was first recorded during the Chinese Han dynasty. Chinese legend ascribes its invention to Prince Liu An (179–122 BC) of Anhui province. Tofu and its production technique were introduced to Japan during the Nara period (710–794) but there are no clear records; tofu first appeared on record in AD 965. Some scholars believe tofu arrived in Vietnam during the 10th and 11th centuries. It spread to other parts of Southeast Asia as well. This probably coincided with the spread of Buddhism as it is an important source of protein in the vegetarian diet of East Asian Buddhism. Li Shizhen, during the Ming dynasty, described a method of making tofu in the Compendium of Materia Medica. Since then, tofu has become a staple in many countries, including Vietnam, Thailand, and Korea, with regional variations in production methods, texture, flavor, and usage.

=== Theories of origin ===
The most commonly held of the three theories of tofu's origin maintains that tofu was discovered by Liu An (179–122 BC), a Han dynasty prince. While plausible, the paucity of reliable sources for this period makes this difficult to conclusively determine. In Chinese history, important inventions were frequently attributed to important leaders and figures of the time. It was used as a cheaper option to meat. In 1960, a stone mural unearthed from an Eastern Han dynasty tomb provided support for the theory of the Han origin of tofu; however some scholars maintain that tofu during the Han dynasty was rudimentary and lacked the firmness and taste for it to be considered as tofu.

Another theory suggests that the production method for tofu was discovered accidentally when a slurry of boiled, ground soybeans was mixed with impure sea salt. Such sea salt would probably have contained calcium and magnesium salts, allowing the soy mixture to curdle and produce a tofu-like gel.

The last group of theories maintains that the ancient Chinese learned the method for curdling soy milk by emulating the milk curdling techniques of the Mongolians. The primary evidence for this theory is the etymological similarity between the Chinese term rǔfǔ (乳腐), which literally means "milk curd", used during Sui dynasty (AD 581–618), for dishes with a consistency like yogurt or soft cheese, later influenced by Mongolian milk products and methods of production, and the term dòufu (豆腐, "bean curd") or tofu. Although intriguing and possible, there is no evidence to substantiate this theory beyond academic speculation.

=== East Asia ===
==== China ====
A form of tofu may have been discovered during the Han dynasty (202 BC – AD 220), but it did not become a popular food in China until the Song dynasty (960–1279).

In China, tofu was traditionally eaten at the graves of deceased relatives. Ghosts were said to have long since lost their chins and jaws, so only tofu was soft enough for them to eat. Before the advent of refrigeration in China, tofu was usually sold only in the winter because it did not spoil easily in cold weather. In the warmer months, once made, tofu would spoil if left for more than a day.

==== Japan ====
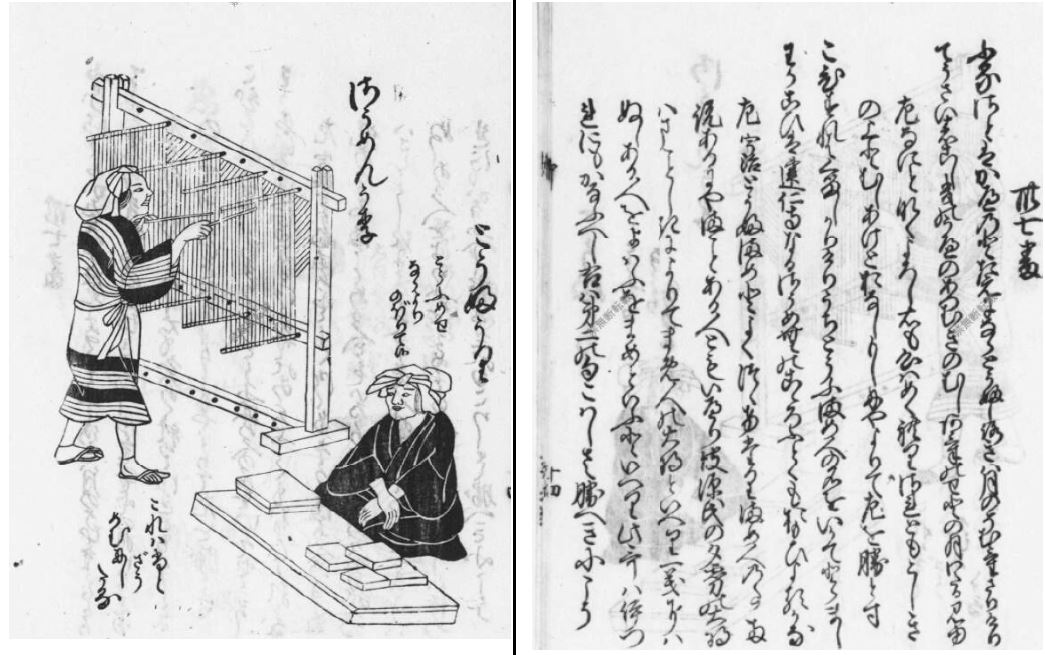
Illustration of a tofu seller (right) and a sōmen seller (left) by Tosa Mitsunobu, from the Songs of the Seventy-one Craftsmen (七十一番職人歌合, Shichijūichi-ban Shokunin Uta-awase), a poetry anthology written around 1500

Tofu was introduced to Japan by Zen Buddhist monks, who initially called it "Chinese curd" (唐符, tōfu). The earliest Japanese document concerning tofu refers to the dish being served as an offering at the Kasuga Shrine in Nara in 1183.

The tofu that was introduced from China is thought to have originally been hard tofu such as island tofu from Okinawa, hard tofu from Hakusan City in Ishikawa Prefecture, Gokayama City in Toyama Prefecture, and Iya region in Tokushima Prefecture. Gradually, production methods were devised to produce smooth tofu with a pleasant texture, and modern silken tofu was born. The book Tofu Hyakuchin (豆腐百珍), published in 1782 of the Edo period, lists 100 recipes for cooking tofu.

=== Southeast Asia ===
The Javanese society of Mataram had gained knowledge of making bean curd (in Old Javanese: tahu) by the time said item was listed among foods served in a ceremonial feast for Balitung off an inscription dated 902 CE, but long after soy beans (kaḍle) were introduced to Javan cultivation by South Indian traders based on morphological comparisons to Indian soy varieties and linguistic evidence.

=== Elsewhere ===
Benjamin Franklin was the first American to mention tofu, in a 1770 letter to John Bartram. Franklin, who encountered it during a trip to London, included a few soybeans and referred to it as "cheese" from China. In 1770, Franklin also corresponded with James Flint on the subject of how the Chinese converted callivances (soybeans) into tofu. Flint's writing "Towfu" in his letter is the earliest documented use of "tofu" in the English language. The first tofu company in the United States was established in 1878. In 1908, Li Yuying, a Chinese anarchist and a vegetarian with a French degree in agriculture and biology, opened a soy factory, the Usine de la Caséo-Sojaïne. This was the world's first soy dairy and the first factory in France to manufacture and sell beancurd.

However, tofu was not well known to most Westerners before the middle of the 20th century, when it was popularized in the United States by William Shurtleff and Akiko Aoyagi (The Book of Tofu, 1975).

== Production ==
Making tofu

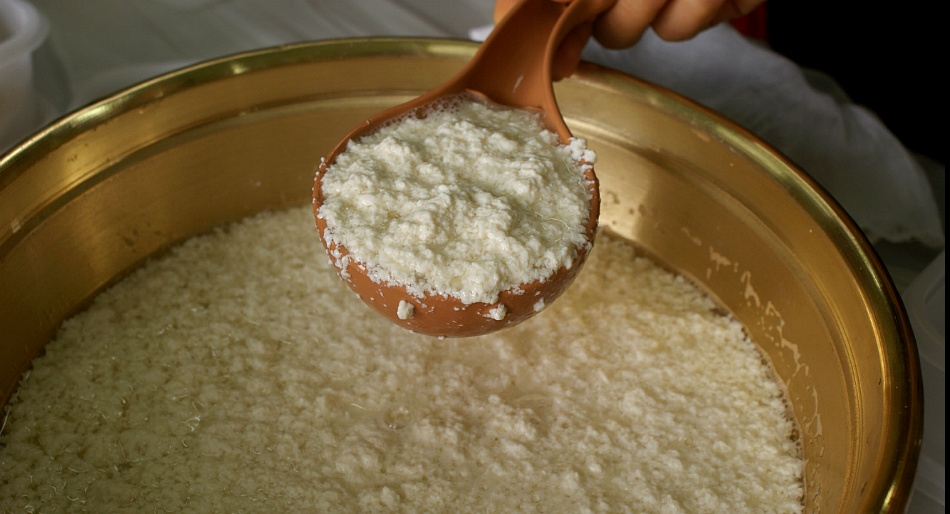
Coagulated soy curds

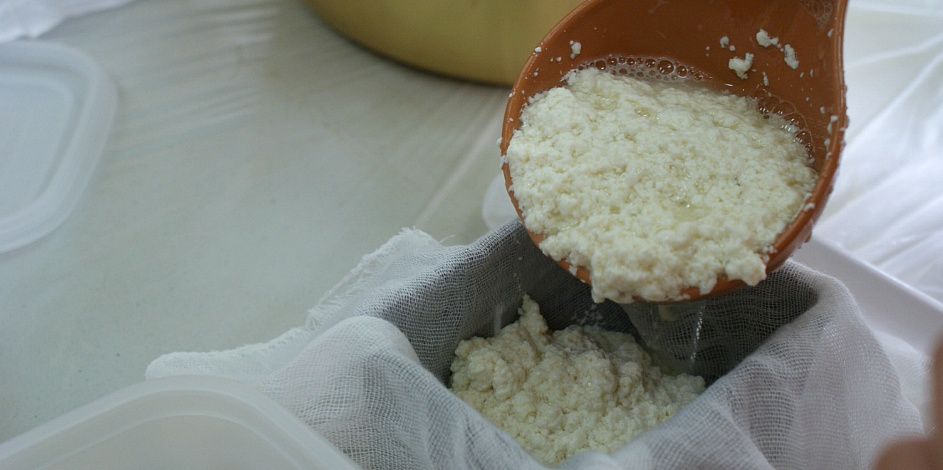
Curds in a tofu mold

Regardless of the product or scale of the production, the production of tofu essentially consists of:

1. The preparation of soy milk
2. The coagulation of the soy milk to form curds (douhua)
3. The pressing of the soybean curds to form tofu cakes

It is similar to the production of dairy cheese by coagulating the milk of dairy animals to form curds and pressing and aging the curds to form cheese. Typical tofu-making procedures are cleaning, soaking, grinding beans in water, filtering, boiling, coagulation, and pressing. There are also types, such as Japanese raw silken tofu, in which the curds are not pressed.

Coagulation of the protein and oil (emulsion) suspended in boiled soy milk is the most important step in the production of tofu. Salts or acids are commonly used as coagulants. Many variables affect the process, including the variety and percentage of protein in the soybeans used, slurry cooking temperature and coagulation temperature.

Soybean proteins are mainly composed of 7S and 11S proteins. The negative surface charges on these globulins usually cause them to repel each other. Heating soy milk denatures the proteins and exposes hydrophobic groups normally oriented toward the inside of the globulin structure. Cations from coagulants bind the negatively charged groups. As the net charges of the protein molecules are neutralized, attractive hydrophobic interactions dominate over repulsive electrostatic charges, and protein aggregates are formed.

=== Salt coagulants ===
Calcium sulfate (gypsum) (Chinese: 石膏; pinyin: shígāo) is the traditional and most widely used coagulant to produce Chinese-style tofu, it produces a tofu that is tender but slightly brittle in texture. The coagulant itself has very little noticeable taste. Also known as gypsum, calcium sulfate is quarried from geological deposits, and no chemical processing or refining is needed, making it the cheapest coagulant used in tofu production. When used in production, the coagulation reaction is slower due to its low solubility, forming a smooth, more gelatinous tofu with relatively high water content and soft texture.

Chloride-type nigari salts or lushui (simplified Chinese: 卤水; traditional Chinese: 鹵水; pinyin: lǔshuǐ) may also be used. Magnesium chloride and calcium chloride are highly soluble in water and affect soy protein in the same way, whereas gypsum is only very slightly soluble in water and acts differently in soy protein precipitation, the basis of tofu formation. These are the coagulants used to make tofu with a smooth and tender texture. In Japan, a white powder called nigari, which consists primarily of magnesium chloride, is produced from seawater after the sodium chloride is removed and the water evaporated. Depending on its production method, nigari/lushui may also contain small quantities of magnesium sulfate (Epsom salt), potassium chloride, calcium chloride, and trace amounts of other naturally occurring salts. Although the term nigari is derived from nigai, the Japanese word for "bitter", both nigari and pure magnesium chloride impart very little perceivable taste to the finished tofu. Calcium chloride is not found in seawater in significant quantities and therefore is not regarded as nigari. It is used extensively in the United States due to its flavor and low cost. Fresh clean seawater itself can also be used as a coagulant.

=== Acid coagulants ===
Glucono delta-lactone (GDL) is a naturally occurring organic acid also used in cheesemaking, this coagulant produces a very fine textured tofu that is almost jelly-like. It is used especially for "silken" and softer tofus and confers a faint sour taste to the finished product. GDL is derived from glucose and takes the form of a white powder at room temperature. Its molecular structure contains a six-membered heterocyclic ring that is hydrolyzed upon contact with water, slowly converting GDL to gluconic acid. When added to soy milk, it gradually lowers the pH and causes proteins to coagulate evenly throughout the mixture, forming a single, smooth gel that is free of air gaps and that resists breaking during transportation. Using GDL as a coagulant, silken tofu can be formed directly in its container, as it does not require pressing. This acid coagulant is also commonly used together with calcium sulfate to give soft tofu a smooth, tender texture.

Other edible acids can be used. Though they can affect the taste of the tofu more, and vary in density and texture, acids such as acetic acid (vinegar) and citric acid (such as lemon juice), can also be used to coagulate soy milk and produce tofu.

=== Enzyme coagulants ===
Among enzymes that have been shown to produce tofu are papain, and alkaline and neutral proteases from microorganisms. Papain, moreover, has been studied as a gelling agent to produce "instant tofu" from soy protein isolate and soy glycinin (11S) protein.

Contemporary tofu manufacturers may choose to use one or more of these coagulants since each plays a role in producing the desired texture in the finished tofu. Different textures result from different pore sizes and other microscopic features in the tofu produced using each coagulant. The coagulant mixture is dissolved in water, and the solution is then stirred into boiled soy milk until the mixture curdles into a soft gel.

Coagulants are typically added at concentrations between 1.5 and 5.0 g/kg. In all coagulants consisting of calcium or magnesium salts, the positive double-bonded ions of the calcium or magnesium are responsible for the coagulation of the soy proteins which become part of the tofu, thereby enhancing its nutritional value. Only 1 part per 1000 of the tofu eaten is coagulant; most of the coagulant reacts with soy protein and is broken down into ions. The non-reactive portion dissolves in the soy whey and is discarded.

Although tartness is sometimes desired in dessert tofu, the acid used in flavoring is usually not the primary coagulant, since concentrations sufficiently high to induce coagulation negatively affect the flavor or texture of the resulting tofu. A sour taste in tofu and a slight cloudiness in its storing liquid is also usually an indication of bacterial growth and, hence, spoilage.

=== Color ===
Whiteness of tofu is determined by soybean variety, soybean protein composition, and degree of aggregation of the tofu gel network. The yellowish-beige color of soybeans is due to the color compounds including anthocyanin, isoflavones, and polyphenol compounds; therefore the soybean variety used will predicate the color of the final tofu product. Ways to reduce the yellow color include reducing isoflavone content by changing the pH of the soy milk solution used in the production of the tofu so that the relevant compounds precipitate out and are removed during the extraction of okara. The opacity of tofu gel and the off-white color typical of standard uncooked firm tofu is due to the scattering of light by the colloidal particles of the tofu. The addition of higher levels of calcium salts or a high protein content will contribute to forming a denser and more aggregated gel network which disperses more light, resulting in tofu with a whiter appearance.

=== Flavor ===
Tofu flavor is generally described as bland, which is generated during the grinding and cooking process, and either a "hot grind" or a "cold grind" can be used to influence the taste. The hot grind method reduces the beany flavor by inactivating the lipoxygenase enzyme in the soy protein that is known to generate off flavors. Eliminating these flavors makes tofu that is "bland". If a cold grind is used lipoxygenase remains and produces the aldehyde, alcohol, and ester volatile compounds that create beany notes.

== Varieties ==
A wide variety of types and flavors of tofu is available in both Western and Eastern markets. Despite the range of options, tofu products can be split into two main categories: 'fresh tofu', which is produced directly from soy milk, and 'processed tofu', which is produced from fresh tofu. Tofu production also creates important by-products that are used in various cuisines.

=== Unpressed fresh ===
Unpressed fresh tofu is gelled soy milk with curd that has not been cut and pressed of its liquid. Depending on whether the soy milk is gelled with bittern (magnesium chloride) solution or a suspension of gypsum (calcium sulfate), different types of unpressed tofu are produced. Gypsum-gelled soft tofu has a smooth and gel-like texture and is commonly known as soft tofu, silken-tofu, or douhua (豆花). The bittern-gelled variety has a very soft spongy curdled texture and is known as extra-soft or sun-dubu (순두부).

Unpressed tofu is so soft that it is directly ladled out for serving or sold with its gelling container.

==== Extra soft ====
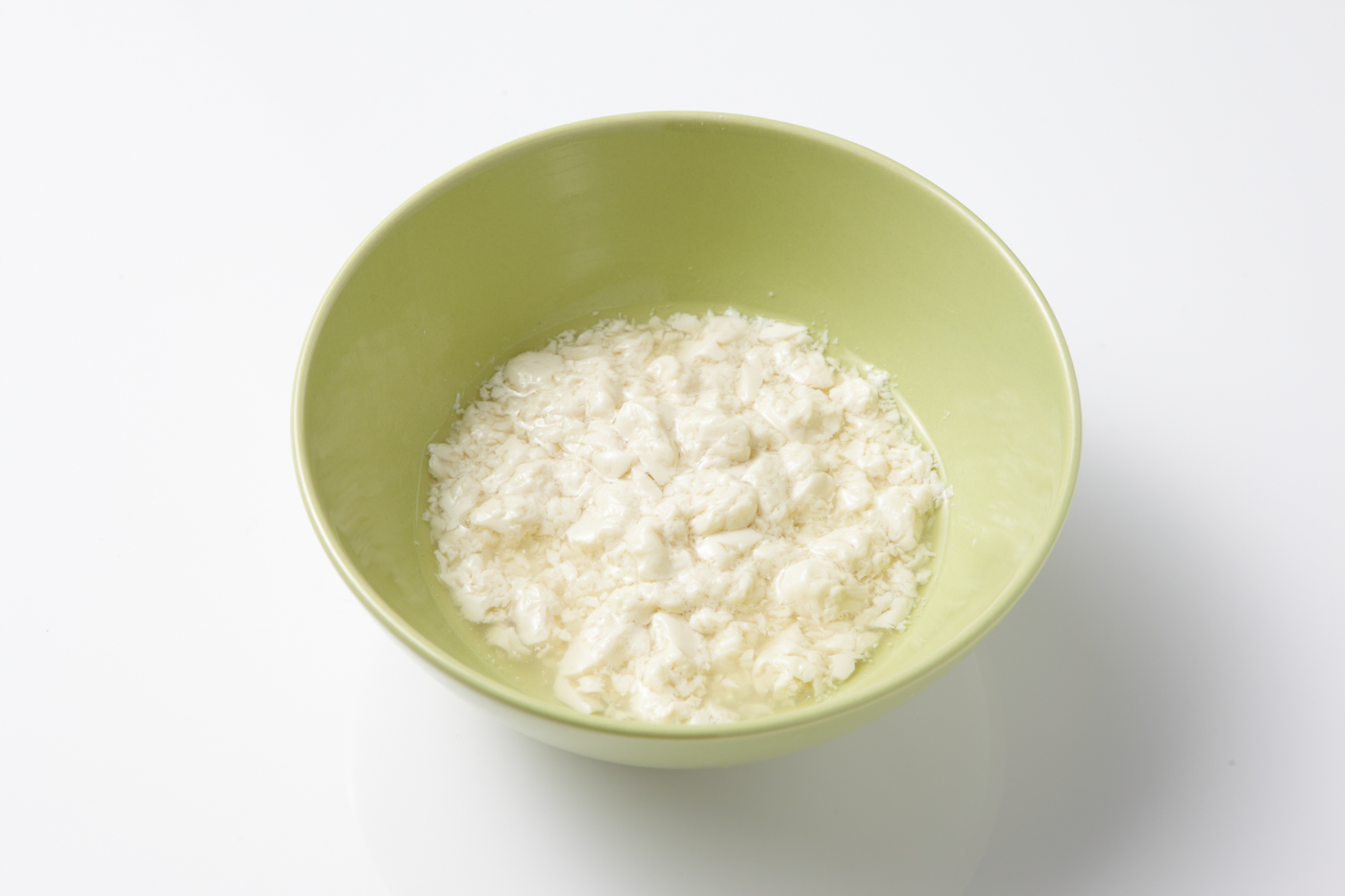
Sun-dubu (extra soft tofu)

Unpressed bittern-gelled soft tofu is called sun-dubu (순두부; "mild tofu") in Korean. Soy milk is mixed with seawater, or saline water made with sea salt, so that it curdles. The curds remain loose and soft. Freshly made sun-dubu is eaten boiled with little or no seasoning. Manufactured sundubu is usually sold in tubes. It is also the main ingredient in sundubu-jjigae (순두부찌개; "soft tofu stew").

Although the word sun in sun-dubu does not have a Sino-Korean origin, sun-dubu is often translated into Chinese and Japanese using the Chinese character 純, whose Korean pronunciation is sun and the meaning is "pure". Thus in China, sun-dubu is called chún dòufu (純豆腐; "pure tofu"), and in Japan, it is called jun-tōfu (純豆腐) or sundubu (スンドゥブ).

==== Soft ====
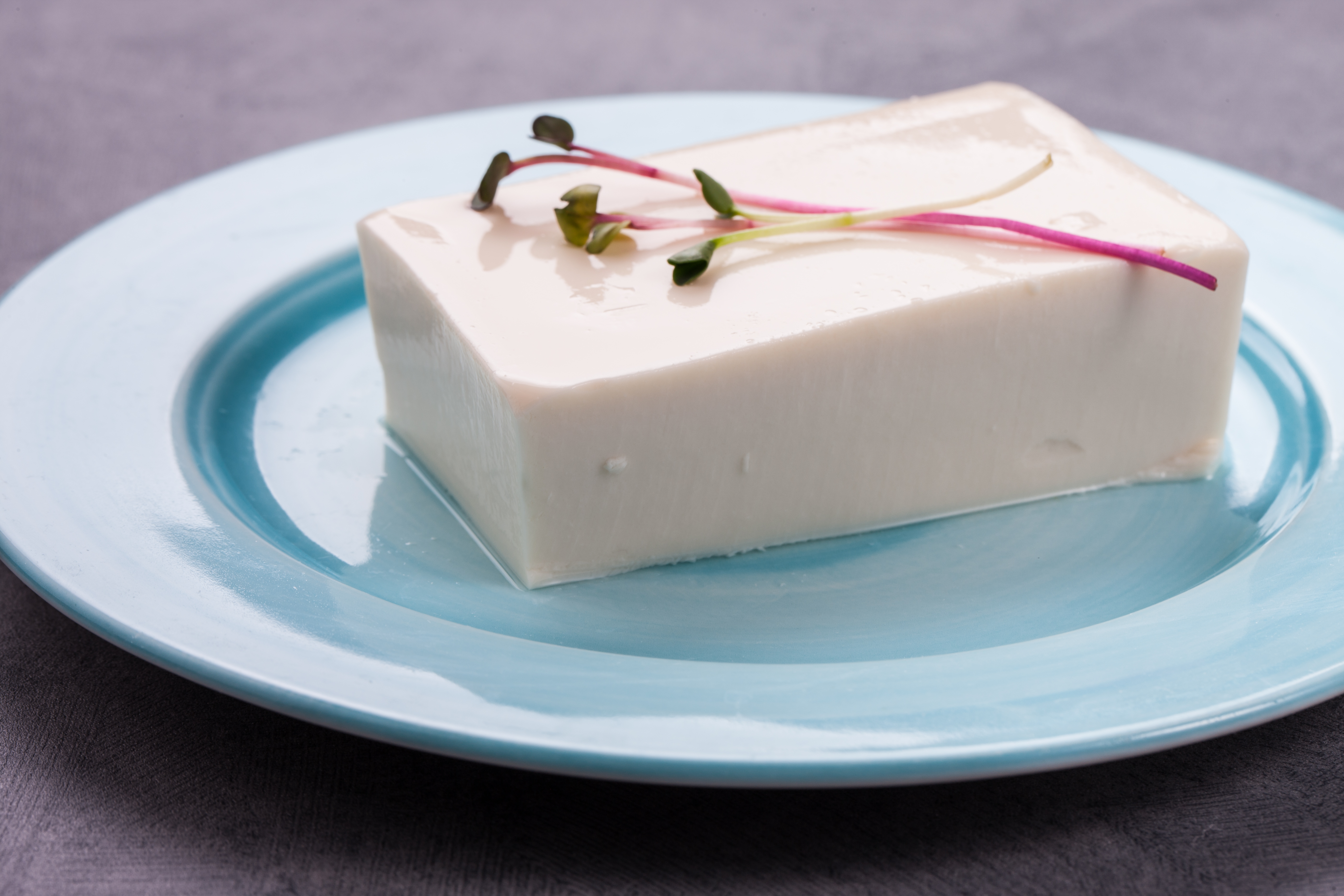
Soft tofu

Soft tofu, also known as "silken tofu", is called nèndòufu (嫩豆腐; "soft tofu") or huádòufu (滑豆腐, "smooth tofu") in Chinese; kinugoshi-dōfu (絹漉し豆腐; "silk-filtered tofu") in Japanese; and yeon-dubu (Korean: 연두부; Hanja: 軟豆腐; "soft tofu") in Korean. Gelled with gypsum, this tofu is undrained, and unpressed, and contains a high moisture content. Silken tofu is produced by coagulating soy milk without cutting the curd. Silken tofu is available in several consistencies, including soft and firm, but all silken tofu is more delicate than regular firm tofu (pressed tofu) and it has different culinary uses. Silken tofu can be used as a substitute for dairy products and eggs, especially for smoothies and baked desserts.

Douhua (豆花, also known as 豆腐花, dòufuhuā in Chinese), or tofu brain (豆腐腦 or 豆腐脑, dòufunǎo in Chinese) or dau fa (Cantonese) and tau hua (Fujianese) (豆花; "bean flower") is similar to silken tofu, but is typically served a few hours after it is prepared. It is most often eaten as a hot dessert, but sometimes salty pickles or hot sauce are added. This is a type of soft tofu with very high moisture content. Douhua is generally eaten with a spoon, as it is too soft to pick up with chopsticks. With the addition of flavorings such as finely chopped green onions, dried shrimp, soy sauce, or chilli sauce, douhua is a popular breakfast dish across China. In Malaysia, douhua is usually served warm with white or dark palm sugar syrup, or served cold with longans. It is frequently served at breakfast or for dessert. It is usually served either with a sweet ginger syrup, or a mushroom gravy called da lu (打卤). It is normally coagulated at the restaurant into a serving container. Douhua is not always considered a type of tofu, but rather a type of food in its own right.

Some variation exists among soft tofus. Black douhua (黑豆花, hēidòuhuā) is a type of silken tofu made from black soybeans, which is usually made into dòuhuā (豆花) rather than firm or dry tofu. The texture of black bean tofu is slightly more gelatinous than regular douhua and the color is greyish in tone. This type of tofu is eaten for its earthy "black bean taste". Edamame tofu is a Japanese variety of kinugoshi tōfu made from edamame (fresh green soybeans); it is pale green in color and often studded with whole edamame.

=== Pressed fresh ===
Depending on the amount of water that is extracted from the cut and pressed curds two types of tofu are produced: firm, and extra firm. Fresh tofu is usually sold completely immersed in water to maintain its moisture content and freshness, and to suppress bacterial growth.

==== Firm ====
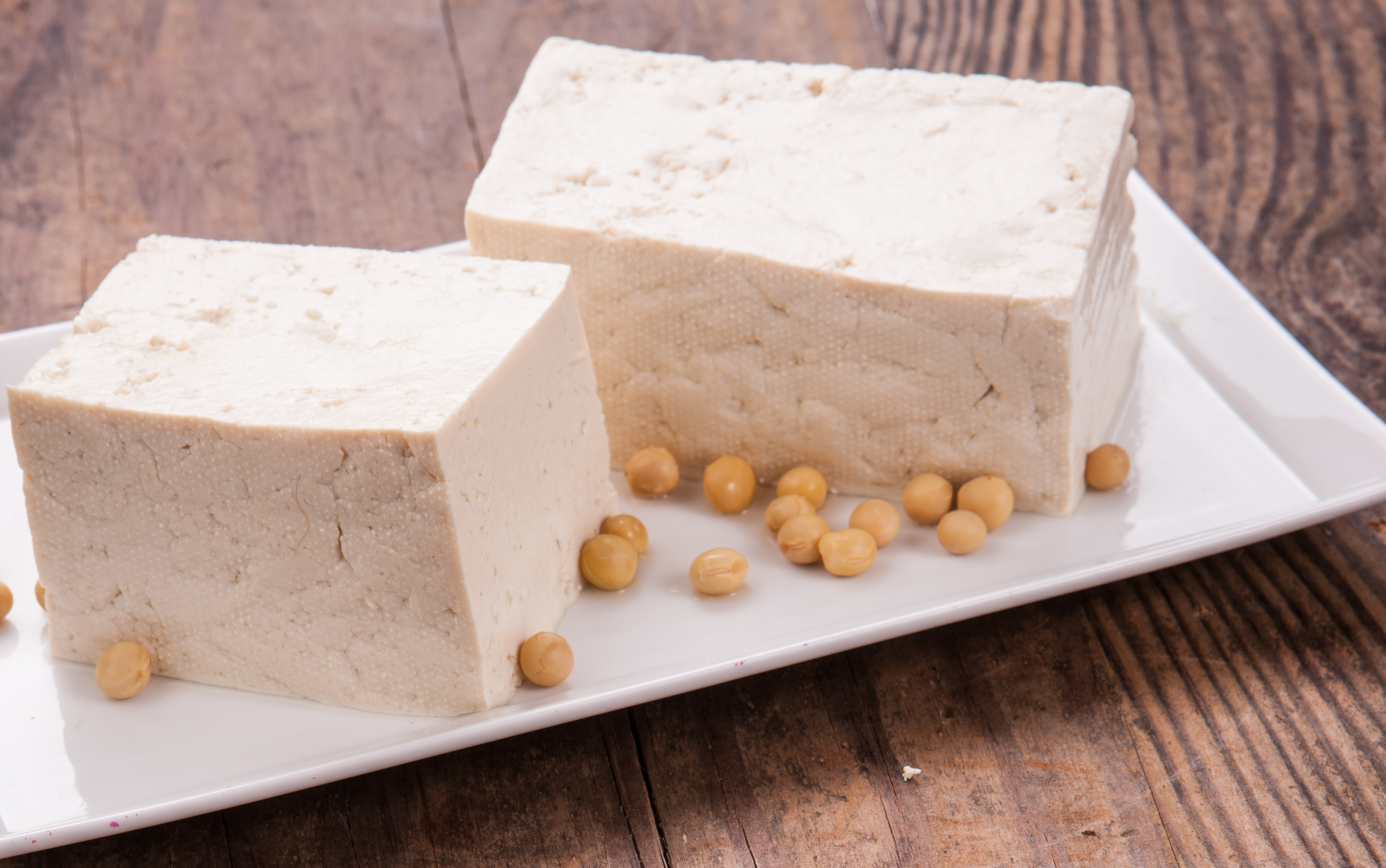
Firm tofu

Firm tofu (called 老豆腐 lǎodòufu in Chinese; 木綿豆腐, momen-dōfu in Japanese, "cotton tofu"; 모두부, mo-dubu in Korean): Although drained and pressed, this form of fresh tofu retains a high moisture content. It has the firmness of raw meat and bounces back readily when pressed. The texture of the inside of the tofu is similar to that of a firm custard. The skin of this form of tofu retains the pattern of the muslin used to drain it, and the outside is slightly more resistant to damage than the inside. It can be picked up easily with chopsticks.

A very firm type of momen-dōfu is eaten in parts of Japan, called ishi-dōfu (石豆腐, "stone tofu") in parts of Ishikawa, or iwa-dōfu (岩豆腐, "rock tofu") in Gokayama in the Toyama Prefecture and in Iya in the prefecture of Tokushima. These types of firm tofu are produced with seawater instead of nigari (magnesium chloride), or using concentrated soy milk. Some of them are squeezed using heavy weights to eliminate excess moisture. These products are produced in areas where traveling is inconvenient, such as remote islands, mountain villages, and heavy snowfall areas.

==== Extra-firm ====
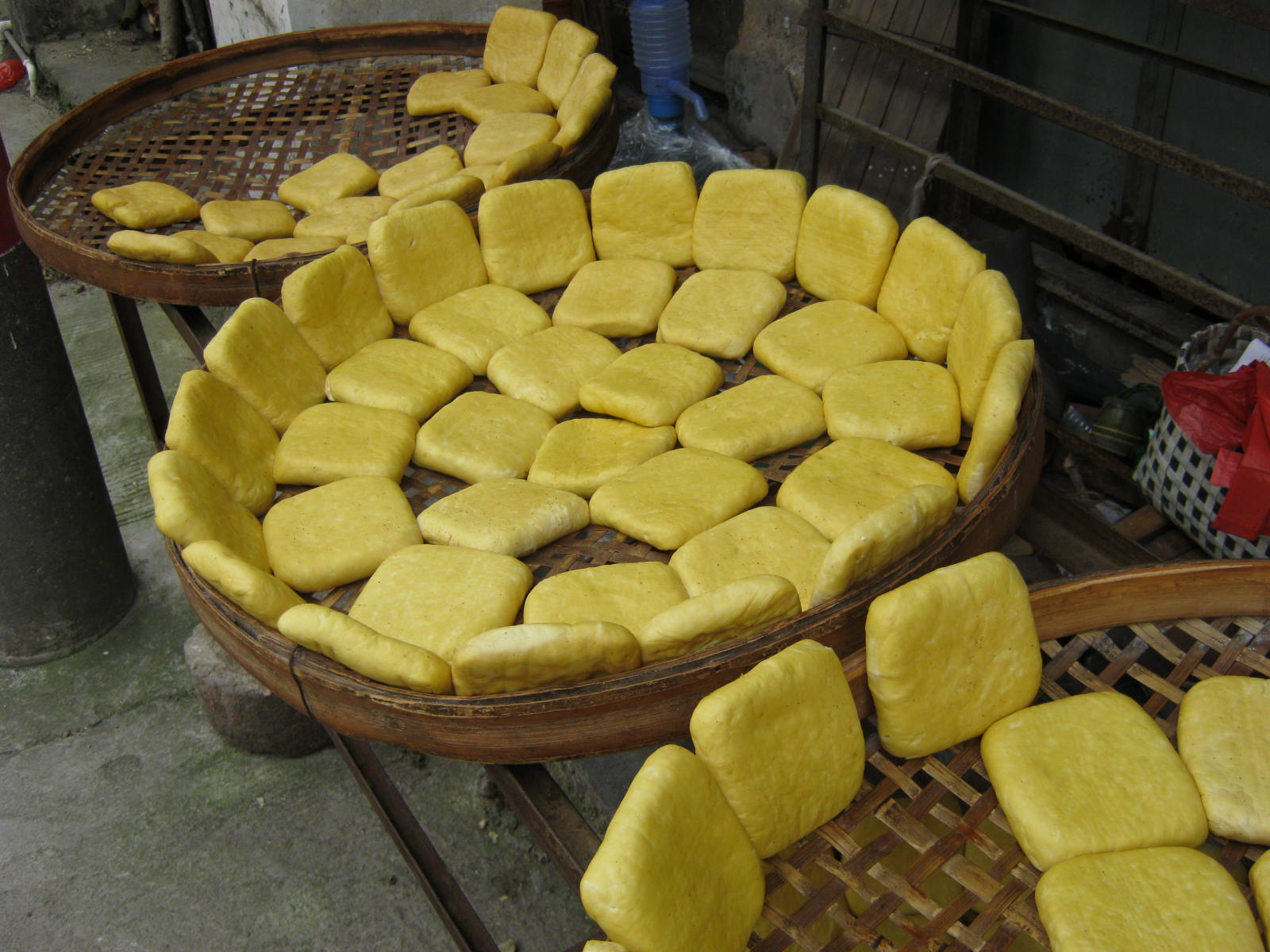
Dòugān (extra firm tofu)

Dòugān (豆乾, literally "dry tofu" in Chinese) is an extra firm variety of tofu where a large proportion of the liquid has been pressed out. Dòugān contains the least moisture of all fresh tofu, the firmness of fully cooked meat, and a somewhat rubbery feel similar to that of paneer. It is not easily crumbled except when sliced thinly. Some varieties of dougan has the pattern of the muslin used to drain and press it. Western firm tofu is milled and reformed after pressing.

One way to cook dougan is to cut it into thin slices called shredded dried tofu (乾絲, gānsī). The strings look like loose cooked noodles and can be served cold, stir-fried, or added to soup, as with Japanese aburaage.

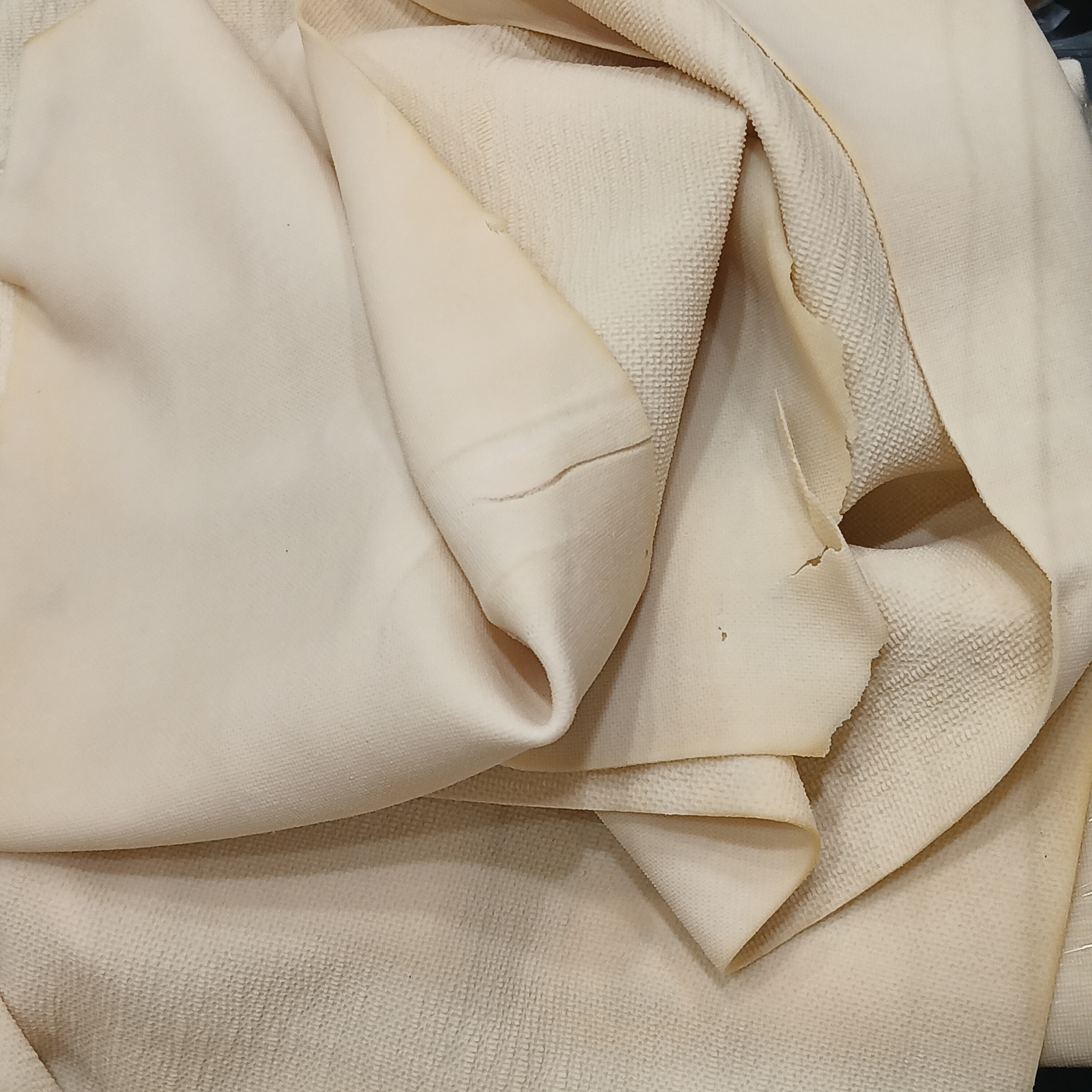
Baiye

Baiye, qianzhang, or gandoufu (百葉; 千張; 乾豆腐) is a very flat (about 2 mm thick) type of extra-firm tofu. It cannot be crumbled. The surface is filled with bulges arranged in a square grid from the muslin used to press it. It can be cut into long strings with a cross-section smaller than 2 mm × 2 mm and eaten in a way similar to gansi. It is also used to make：

- Su ji (素鸡, "vegetarian chicken"), either by being rolled up or by being pressed together and fried.
- Baiye jie (百叶结 "baiye knots"), by slicing into 2 cm × 10 cm slices and tying the slice up.
- Various dishes that roll other food items inside a piece of baiye.

=== Processed tofu ===
Many forms of processed tofu exist. Some processing techniques probably originate before the days of refrigeration from the need to preserve tofu or to increase its shelf life. Other production techniques are employed to create tofus with different textures and flavors.

==== Fermented ====
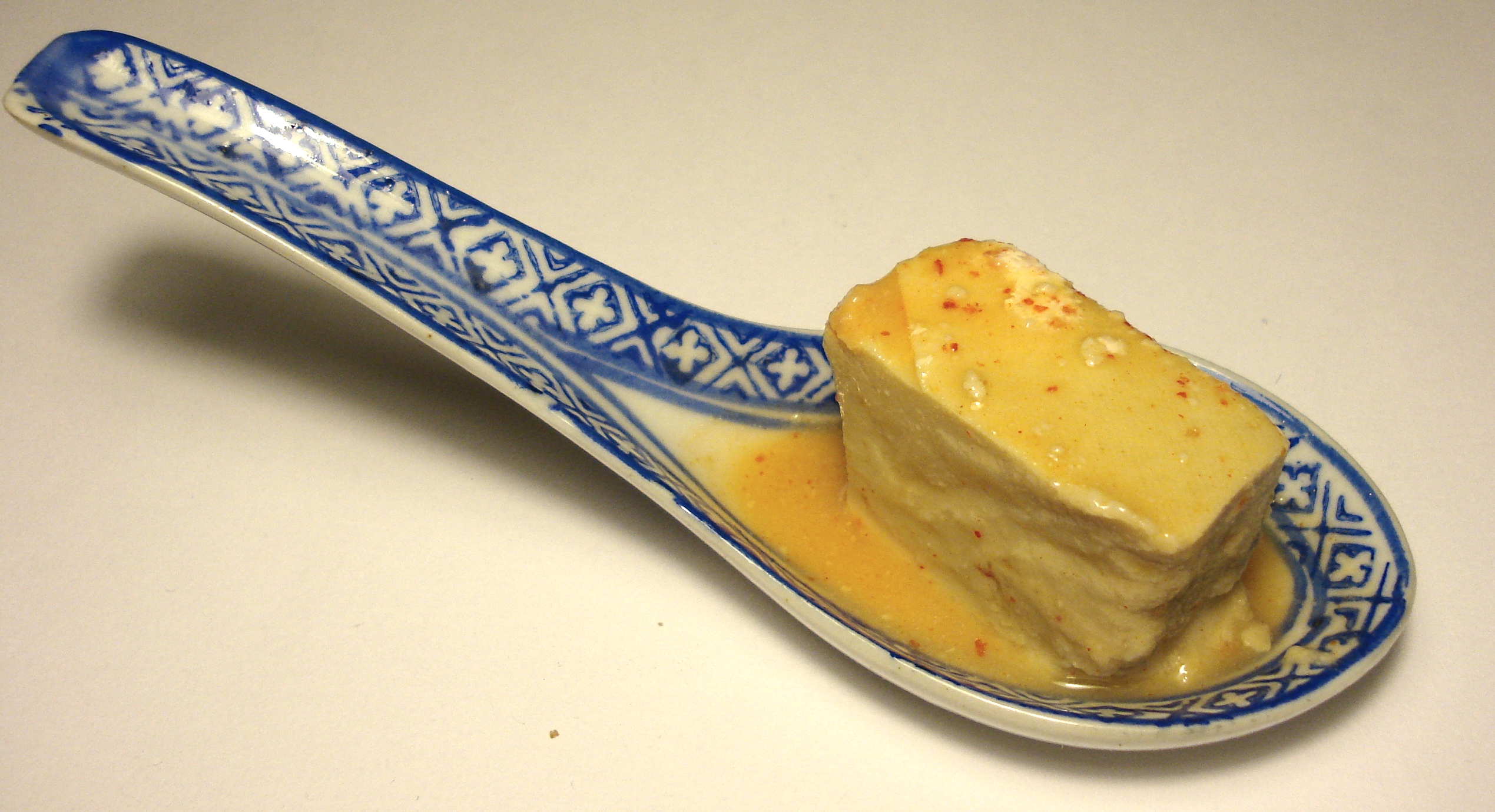
Pickled tofu

- Pickled tofu (豆腐乳 in Chinese, pinyin: dòufurǔ, or 腐乳 fŭrŭ; chao in Vietnamese), also called "preserved tofu" or "fermented tofu", consists of cubes of dried tofu that have been allowed to fully air dry under hay and slowly ferment with the help of aerial bacteria. The dry fermented tofu is then soaked in salt water, Chinese rice wine, vinegar or minced chili peppers, or in a mixture of whole rice, bean paste, and soybeans. In the case of red pickled tofu (紅豆腐乳 in Chinese, Pinyin: hóng dòufurǔ), red yeast rice (cultivated with Monascus purpureus) is added for color. (Note: The Hwang Ryh Shang Company of Taiwan, a major producer of pickled tofu, mislabels this ingredient as "red date" (jujube) on the English-language list of ingredients on its product labels, although the Chinese list of ingredients on the same product lists 紅糟 (literally "red lees", i.e. red yeast rice).) In Japan, pickled tofu with miso paste is called tofu no misodzuke, and is a traditional preserved food in Kumamoto. In the Ryukyu Islands, pickled and fermented tofu is called tōfuyō (豆腐餻). It is made from Shima-dōfu (an Okinawan variety of large and firm tofu). It is fermented and matured with koji mold, red koji mold, and awamori.
- Stinky tofu (臭豆腐 in Chinese, Pinyin: chòudòufu) is soft tofu that has been fermented in a vegetable and fish brine. The blocks of tofu have a pungent cheese smell, sometimes resembling rotting food. Despite its strong odor, the flavor and texture of stinky tofu is appreciated by aficionados, who describe it as delightful. The texture of this tofu is similar to the soft East Asian tofu from which it is made. The rind that stinky tofu develops when fried is said to be best when especially crisp, and fried stinky tofu is usually served with soy sauce, sweet sauce, or hot sauce.

==== Frozen ====
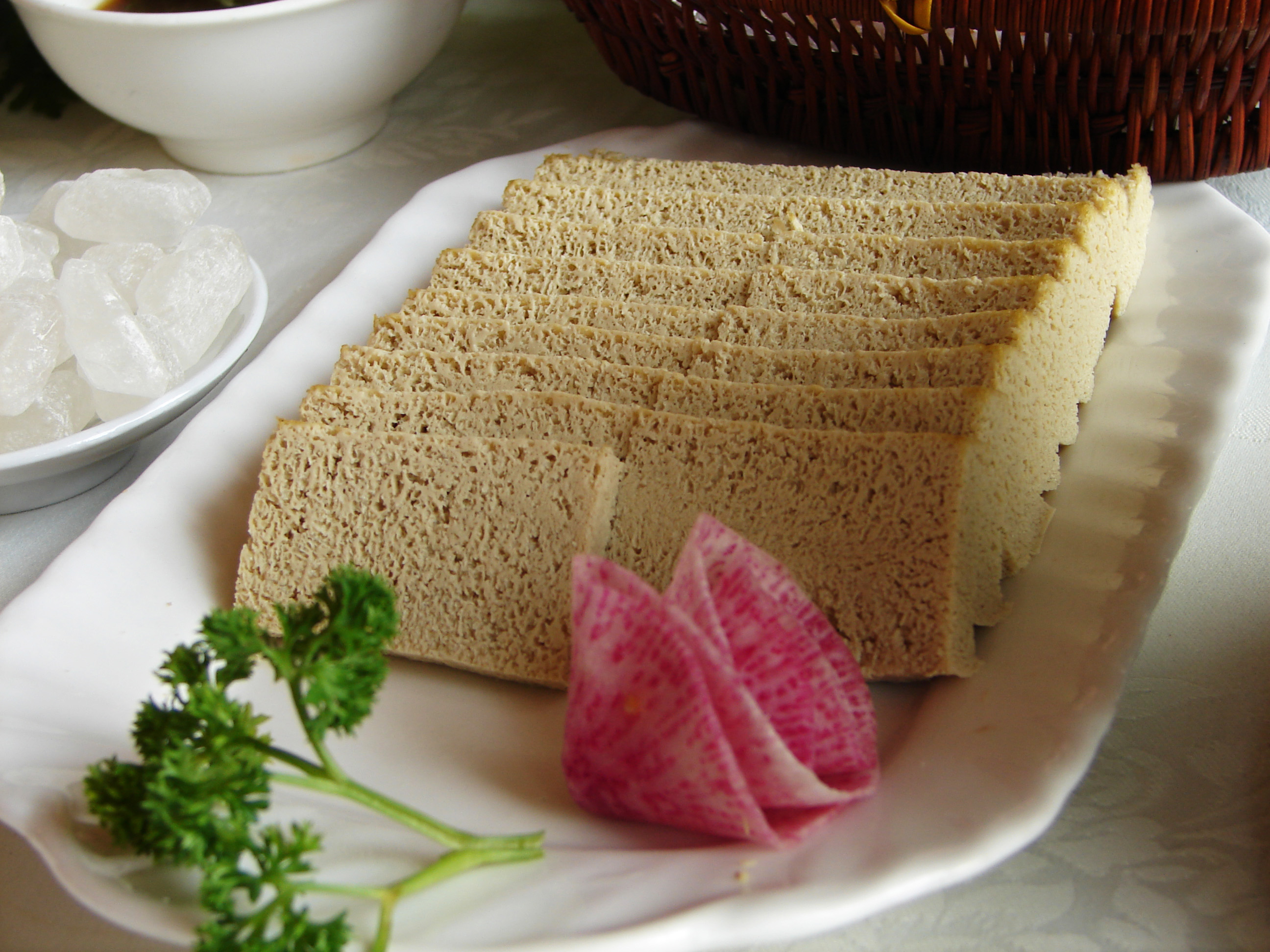
Thawed and sliced frozen tofu

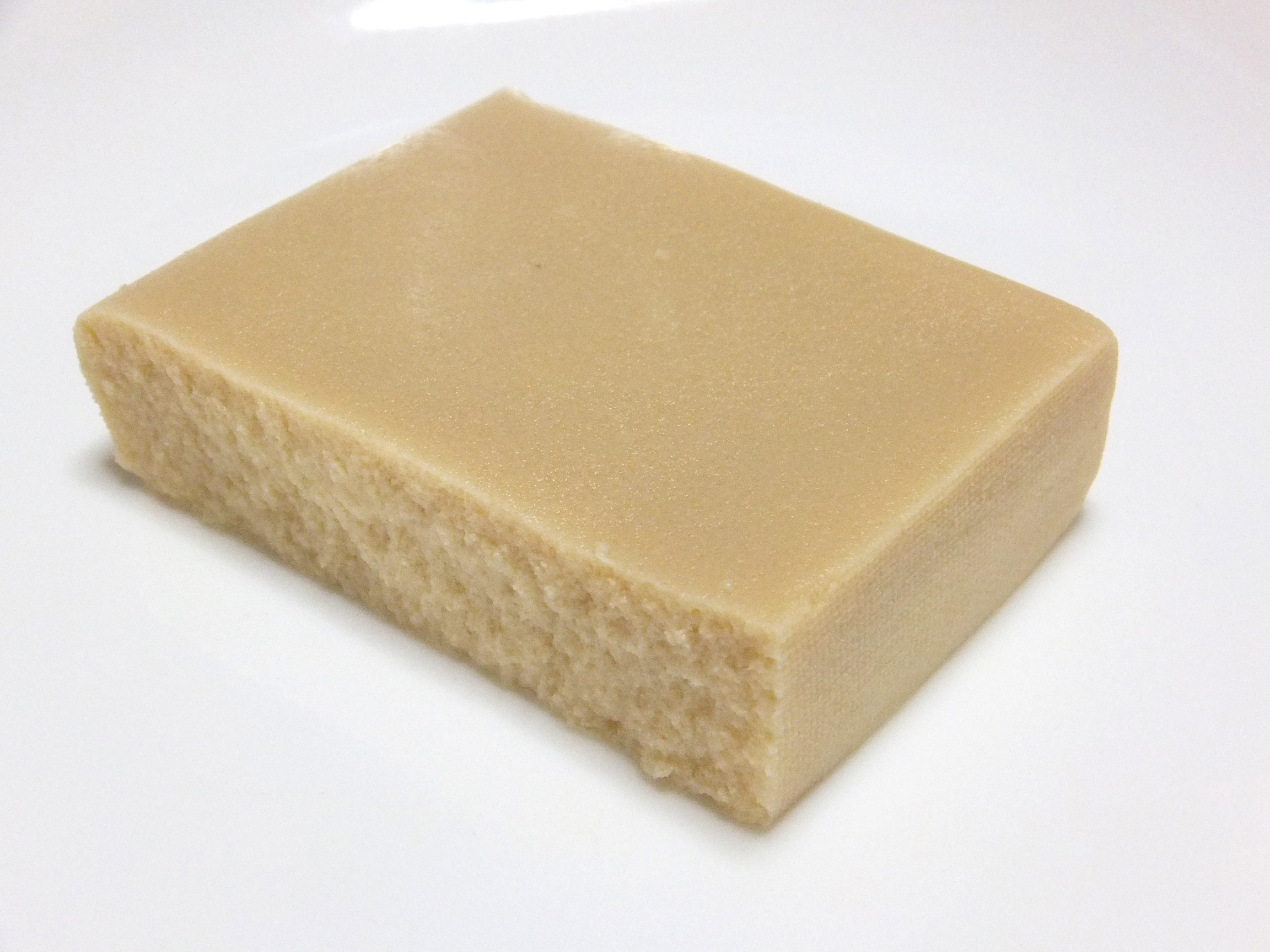
Koya-dofu after soaking in water

The ice crystals that develop within frozen tofu (凍豆腐 dòngdòufu, 冰豆腐 bīngdòufu in Chinese, both meaning "frozen tofu") result in the formation of large cavities that appear to be layered. Frozen tofu takes on a yellowish hue in the freezing process. Frozen tofu originates in the Jiangnan region of China and is commonly made at home from soft tofu. It is also commercially sold as a specialty in Hong Kong, Taiwan, and other areas with Jiangnan emigrants. It is regularly paired with tatsoi as a winter dish. Frozen tofu is defrosted before serving and sometimes pressed to remove moisture prior to use.

During freezing, the ice crystals puncture cell walls and facilitate the release of free and bound water and cause a decrease in total water content in tofu after freezing then thawing. The initial protein-water bonds are irreversibly replaced by protein-protein bonds, which are more elastic and cause a structural change to the gel network and lead to an increase in textural properties such as hardness, springiness, cohesiveness, and gumminess.

In Japan, two kinds of freeze-dried tofu are produced. Those are usually rehydrated by being soaked in water prior to consumption. In their dehydrated state, they do not require refrigeration.

- Koya-dofu (kōya-dōfu, 高野豆腐 in Japanese) is a freeze-dried type also known as kōri tofu (凍り豆腐, "frozen tofu"). Originally from Mount Kōya, a center of Japanese Buddhism famed for its shōjin ryōri, or traditional Buddhist vegetarian cuisine. It is said that the method of koya-dofu was discovered by accident by leaving tofu outdoors in the winter season. It is sold in freeze-dried blocks or cubes in Japanese markets. It is typically simmered in dashi, sake or mirin and soy sauce. In shōjin ryōri, vegetarian kombu dashi, made from seaweed, is used. When prepared in the usual manner, it has a spongy texture and a mildly sweet or savory flavor. The taste and flavor depend on what soup or cooking stock it was simmered in. A similar form of freeze-dried tofu, in smaller pieces, is found in instant soups (such as miso soup), in which the toppings are freeze-dried and stored in sealed pouches.
- Shimidōfu (凍み豆腐) is mainly consumed in the Tohoku region. While koya-dofu is made by shade-drying, shimidofu is made by sun-drying.

=== By-products ===
==== Tofu skin ====
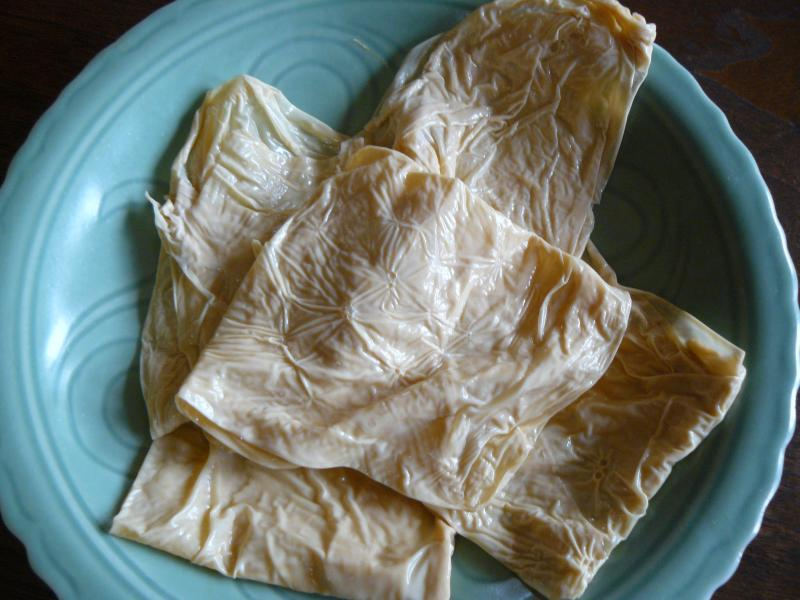
Tofu skin

Tofu skin is produced when soy milk is boiled in an open, shallow pan, thus producing a film or skin composed primarily of a soy protein-lipid complex on the liquid surface. Tofu skin is cooked with noodles.

==== Soy pulp ====
Okara, from the Japanese 雪花菜(おから), is known as 雪花菜 xuěhuācài, in Chinese, lit. "snowflake vegetable"; 豆腐渣, dòufuzhā, also Chinese, lit. "tofu sediment/residue"; and 콩비지, kongbiji, in Korean).

Sometimes known in the west as "soy pulp" or "tofu lees", okara is a tofu by-product consisting of the fiber, protein, and starch left over when soy milk has been extracted from ground soaked soybeans. It is often used as animal feed in most tofu-producing cultures, but also has other uses in Japanese and Korean cuisines, such as in the Korean stew kongbiji jjigae (콩비지찌개). It is also an ingredient for vegetarian burgers in many Western nations. In Japan, it is used to make ice cream.

=== Tofu-like foods ===
The term tofu is used by extension for similarly textured curdled dishes that do not use soy products, such as "almond tofu" (almond jelly), tamago-dōfu (egg), goma-dōfu (sesame), or peanut tofu (Chinese 落花生豆腐 luòhuāshēng dòufu and Okinawan jīmāmi-dōfu).

Due to their East Asian origins and their textures, many food items are called "tofu", even though their production processes are not technically similar. For instance, many sweet almond tofus are actually gelatinous desserts hardened using agar or gelatin. Some foods, such as Burmese tofu, are not coagulated from the "milk" of the legume but rather set in a manner similar to soft polenta, Korean muk, or the jidou liangfen of Yunnan province of southwest China.

==== Almond tofu ====
"Almond tofu" (Chinese: 杏仁豆腐 xìngrén dòufu; Japanese: annindōfu) is a milky white and gelatinous substance resembling tofu, but it does not use soy products or soy milk and is hardened with agar. A similar dessert made with coconut milk or mango juices may occasionally be referred to as "coconut tofu" or "mango tofu", although such names are also given to hot dishes that use soy tofu and coconut or mango in the recipe.

==== Chickpea tofu ====
Burmese tofu (to hpu in Burmese) is a legume product made from besan (chana dal) flour; the Shan variety uses yellow split pea flour instead. Both types are yellow in color and generally found only in Myanmar, and Yunnan province of China, though the Burman variety is also available in some overseas restaurants serving Burmese cuisine. The term is believed to be derived from Dou Fen (bean Jelly) from Chinese and it was adopted to Burmese cuisine through Shan people (Dai people of Yunnan) . Burmese tofu may be fried as fritters cut into rectangular or triangular shapes.

A variety called hsan to hpu (or hsan ta hpo in Shan regions) is made from rice flour (called hsan hmont or mont hmont) and is white in color with the same consistency as yellow Burmese tofu when set. It is eaten as a salad in the same manner as yellow tofu.

==== Egg tofu ====
Egg tofu (Japanese: 玉子豆腐, 卵豆腐, tamagodōfu) (Chinese: 蛋豆腐, dàndòufu; often called 日本豆腐, Rìbĕn dòufu, lit. "Japan bean curd") is the main type of savory flavored tofu. Whole beaten eggs are combined with dashi, poured into molds, and cooked in a steamer (cf. chawanmushi). This tofu has a pale golden color that can be attributed to the addition of eggs and, occasionally, food coloring. This tofu has a fuller texture and flavor than silken tofu, due to the presence of egg fat and proteins. Plain "dried tofu" can be flavored by stewing in soy sauce (滷) to make soy-sauce tofu. It is common to see tofu sold from hot food stalls in this soy-sauce stewed form. Today egg "Japanese" tofu is made of eggs, water, vegetable protein, and seasoning.

Egg tofu was invented in Japan during the Edo period. The book 万宝料理秘密箱 written in 1785 recorded how to make Japanese tofu. Later the Japanese form of tofu entered Southeast Asia, being introduced to China in 1995 from Malaysia.

100 grams of egg tofu has 17 mg calcium, 24 mg magnesium, and 5 grams protein while 100 grams tofu has 138 mg calcium, 63 mg magnesium and 12.2 grams protein. Compared with tofu, Japanese tofu's nutritional value is lower.

==== Peanut tofu ====
In the Ryukyu Islands, jīmāmi-dōfu (ジーマーミ豆腐) a peanut milk, made by crushing raw peanuts, adding water and straining, is combined with starch (usually sweet potato, known locally as nmukuji, nmukashi (芋澱粉) and heated until curdling occurs.

The Chinese equivalent is 落花生豆腐 luòhuāshēng dòufu.

==== Sesame tofu ====
The tofu known as goma-dōfu is made by grinding sesame into a smooth paste, combining it with liquid and kudzu starch, and heating it until curdling occurs. It is often served chilled as hiyayakko.

==== Thousand-layer tofu ====
Thousand-layer tofu (simplified Chinese: 千叶豆腐; traditional Chinese: 千葉豆腐; pinyin: qiānyè dòufu; lit. 'thousand-layer tofu') is not a true tofu made by coagulation of soymilk, but a modern invention made from soy protein isolate and a source of starch. It has a smooth, bouncy texture somewhat comparable to kamaboko. Originally a Taiwanese invention called hundred-layer tofu (百葉豆腐), it was renamed in China to avoid confusion with the existing type of extra-firm tofu called baiye.

== Preparation ==
Tofu has little flavor or smell of its own. Consequently, tofu can be used in both savory and sweet dishes, acting as a bland background for presenting the flavors of the other ingredients used. In order to flavor the tofu, it is often marinated in soy sauce, chillis, or sesame oil.

A common cooking technique in many parts of East and Southeast Asia involves deep frying tofu in vegetable oil like sunflower or canola.

=== East Asia ===
==== China ====
Many Chinese tofu dishes such as jiācháng dòufu (家常豆腐) and mapo tofu (麻婆豆腐) may include meat.

In Chinese cuisine, Dòuhuā (豆花) is served with toppings such as boiled peanuts, azuki beans, cooked oatmeal, tapioca, mung beans, or a syrup flavored with ginger or almond. During the summer, "dòuhuā" is served with crushed ice; in the winter, it is served warm. In many parts of China, fresh tofu is eaten with soy sauce or further flavored with katsuobushi shavings, century eggs (皮蛋 pídàn), and sesame seed oil.

With the exception of the softest tofus, all forms of tofu can be fried. Thin and soft varieties of tofu are deep fried in oil until they are light and airy in their core 豆泡 dòupào, 豆腐泡 dòufupào, 油豆腐 yóudòufu, or 豆卜 dòubǔ in Chinese, literally "bean bubble", describing the shape of the fried tofu as a bubble.

Depending on the type of tofu used, the texture of deep-fried tofu may range from crispy on the outside and custardy on the inside, to puff up like a plain donut. The former is usually eaten plain in Chinese cuisine with garlic soy sauce, while the latter is either stuffed with fish paste to make Yong Tau Foo or cooked in soups. In Taiwan, fried tofu is made into a dish called "A-gei", which consists of a fried aburage tofu package stuffed with noodles and capped with surimi.

Tofus such as firm East Asian and dòugān (Chinese dry tofu), with their lower moisture content, are cut into bite-sized cubes or triangles and deep fried until they develop a golden-brown, crispy surface (炸豆腐 in Chinese, zhádòufu, lit. "fried tofu"). These may be eaten on their own or with a light sauce, or further cooked in liquids; they are also added to hot pot dishes or included as part of the vegetarian dish called luohan zhai.

Some types of dried tofu are pre-seasoned with special blends of spices, so that the tofu may either be called "five-spice tofu" (五香豆腐 wǔxiāng dòufu) or "soy sauce stewed tofu" (滷水豆腐 lǔshuǐ dòufu). Dried tofu is typically served thinly sliced with chopped green onions or with slices of meat for added flavor.

Pickled tofu is commonly used in small amounts together with its soaking liquid to flavor stir-fried or braised vegetable dishes (particularly leafy green vegetables such as water spinach). It is often eaten directly as a condiment with rice or congee.

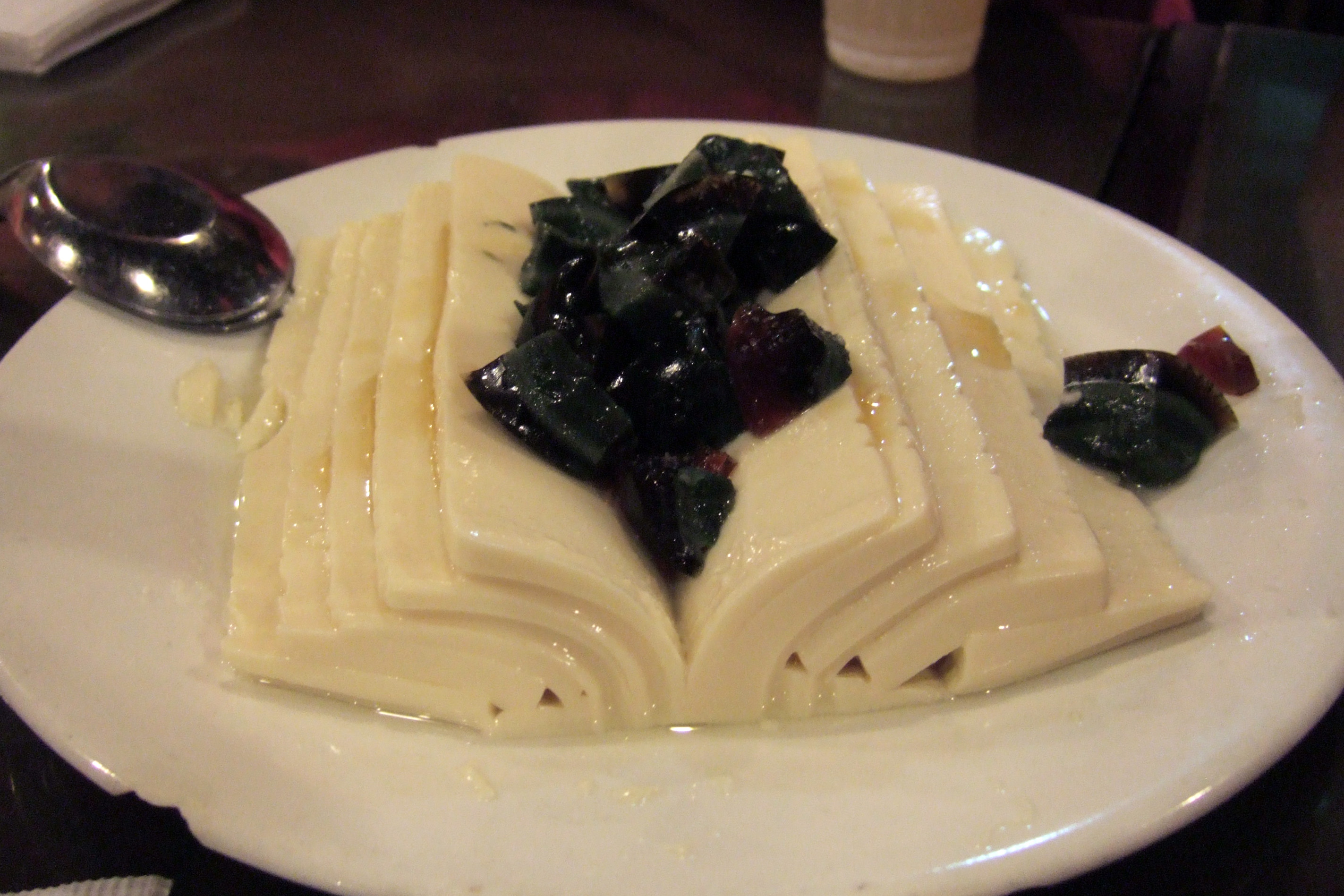
Chinese soft tofu dish, pidan doufu

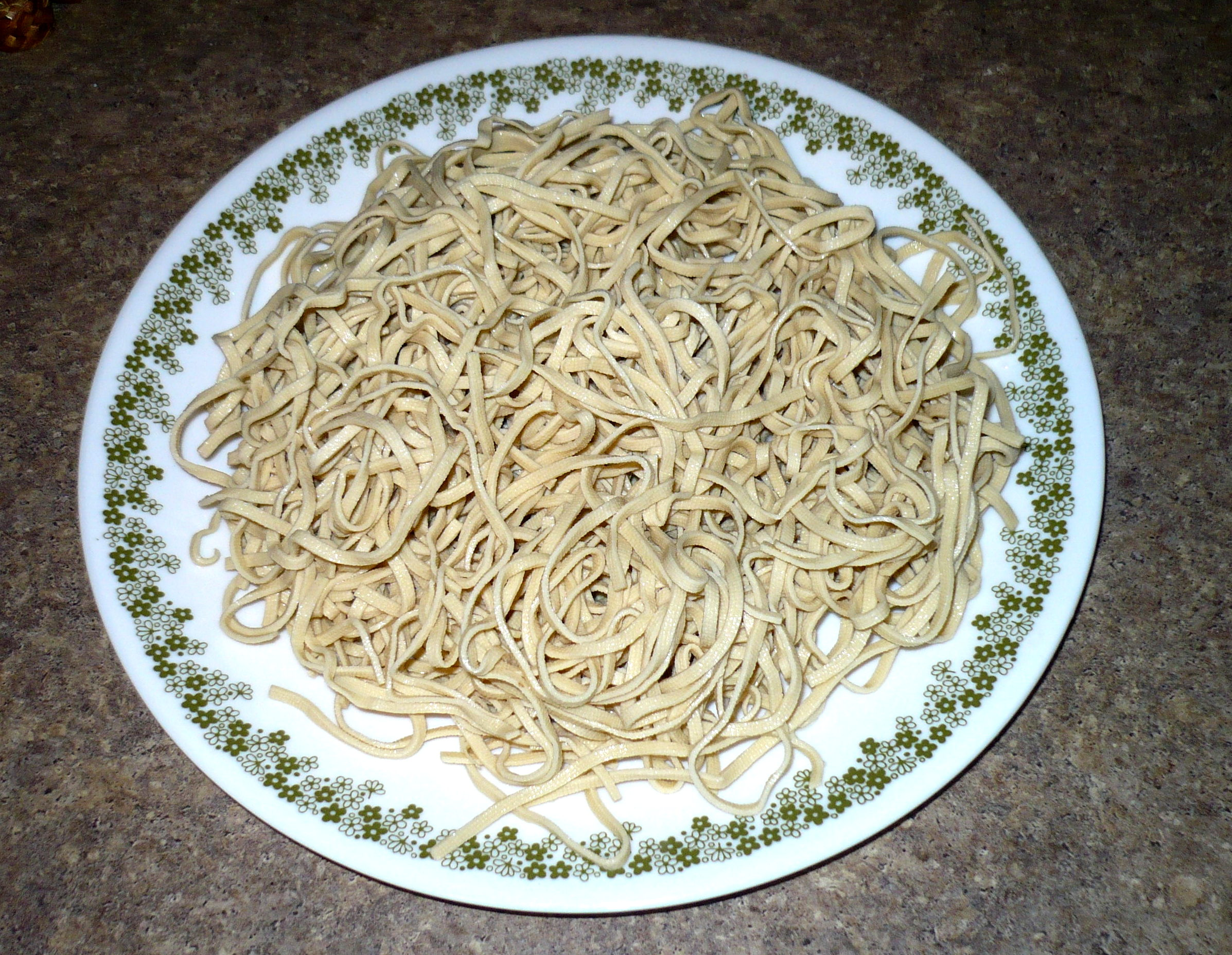
Prepared dried tofu threads (乾絲, gānsī)

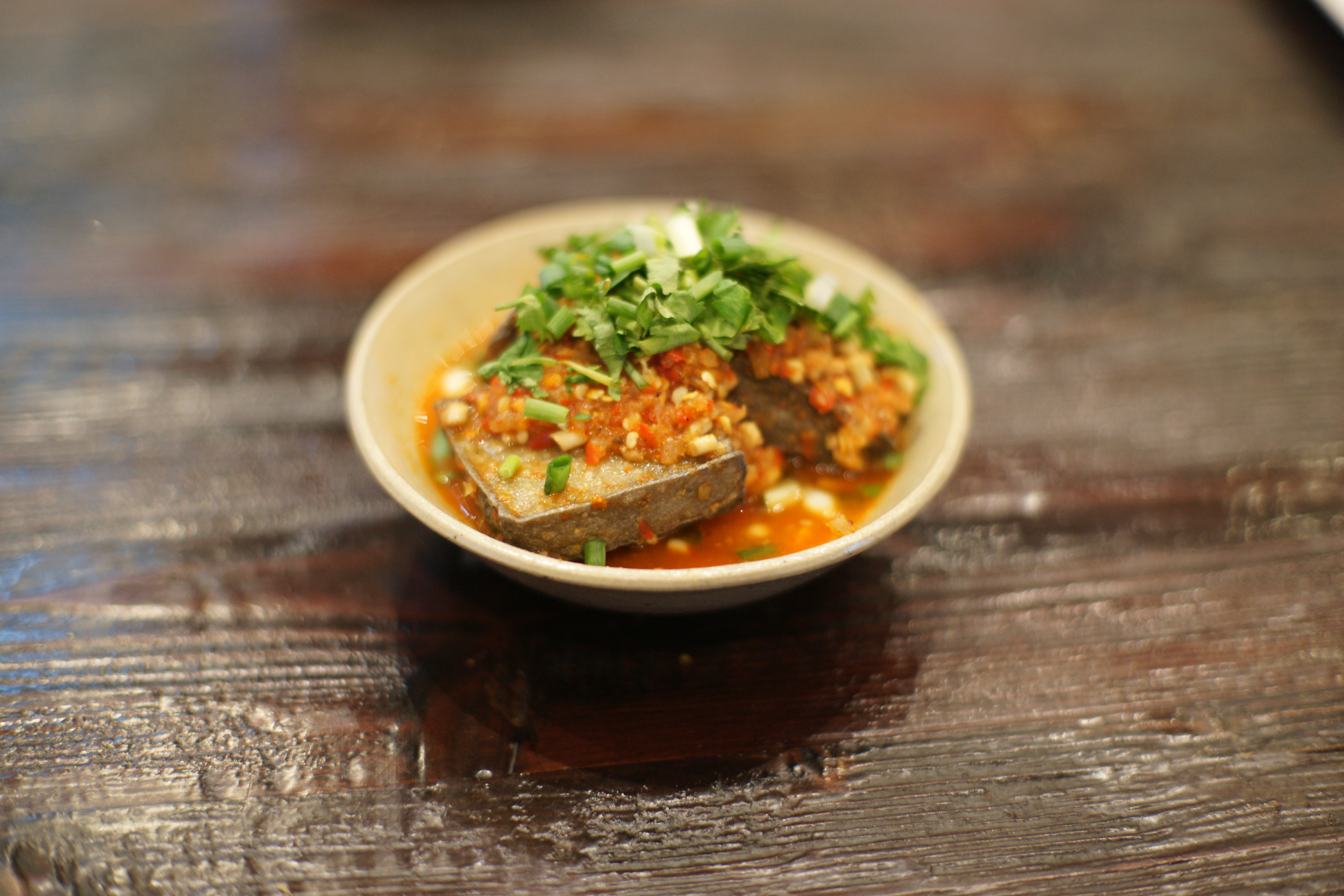
Chòudòufu (臭豆腐） is a very pungent type of tofu.

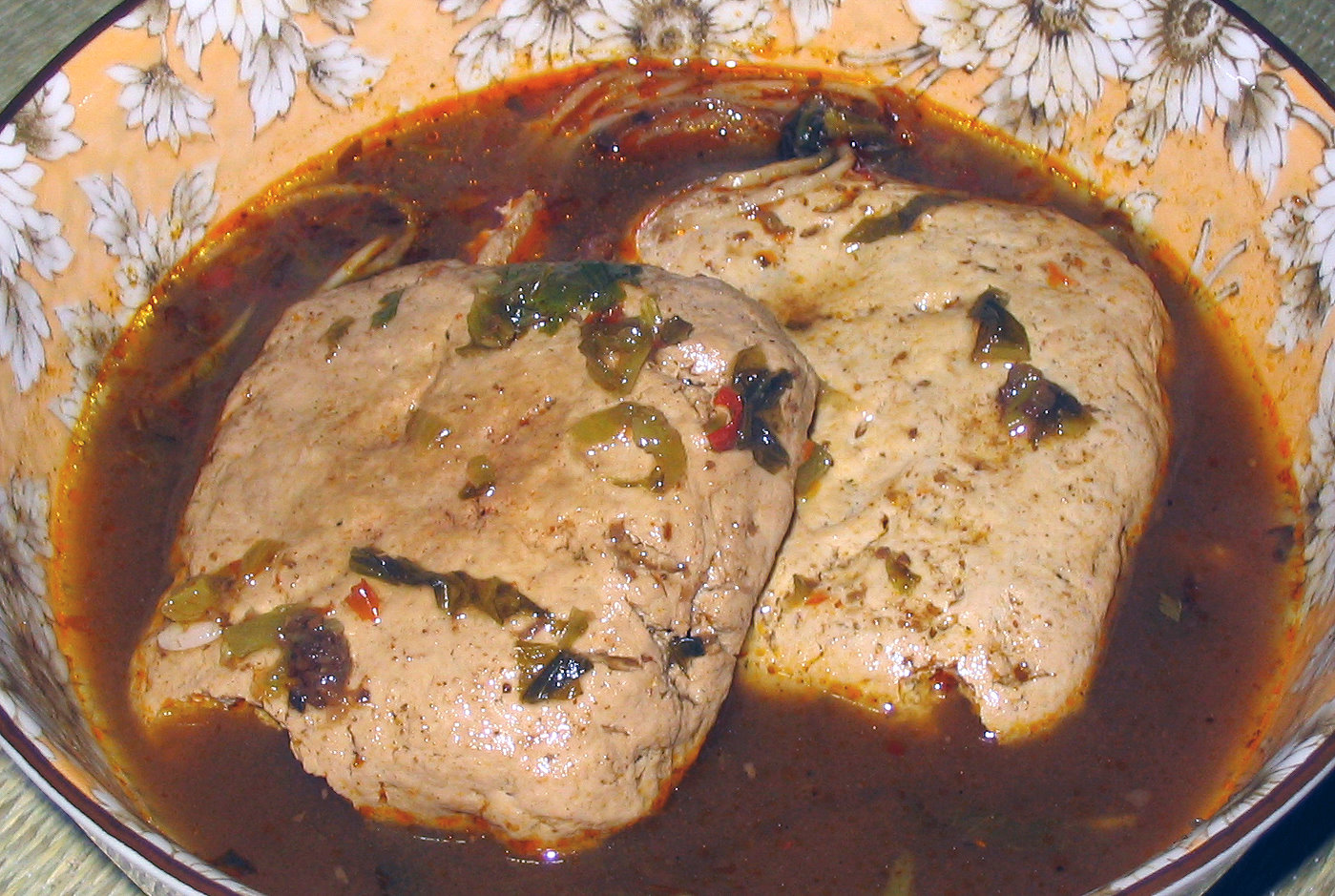
Sichuan-style (málà chòudòufu 麻辣臭豆腐) numbing spicy stinky tofu

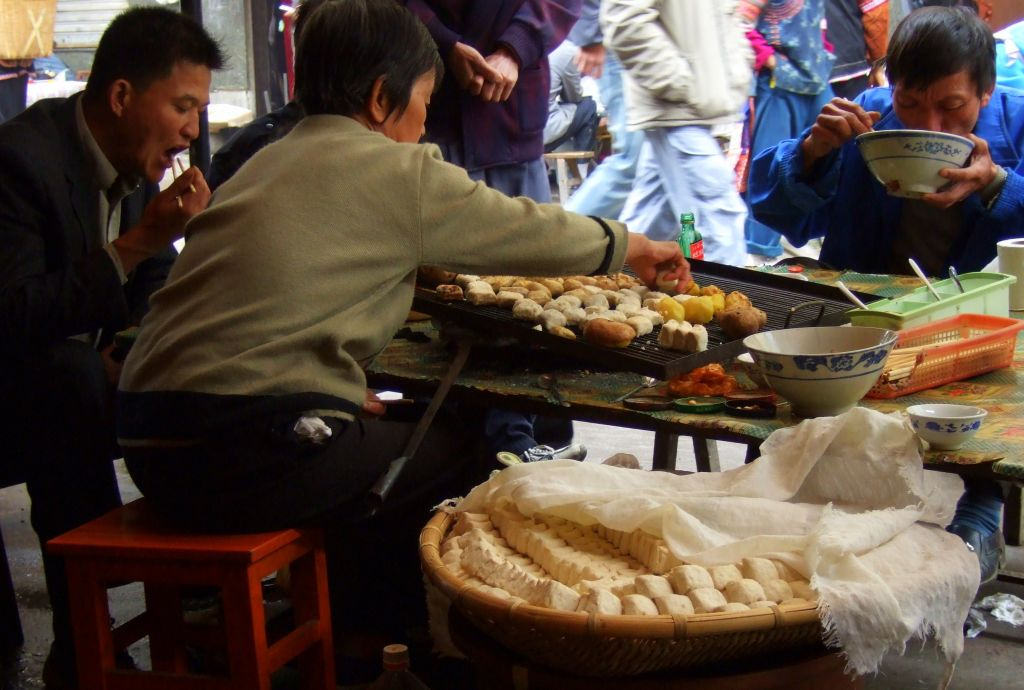
Tofu and potatoes grilled at a street stall in Yuanyang, Yunnan province, China

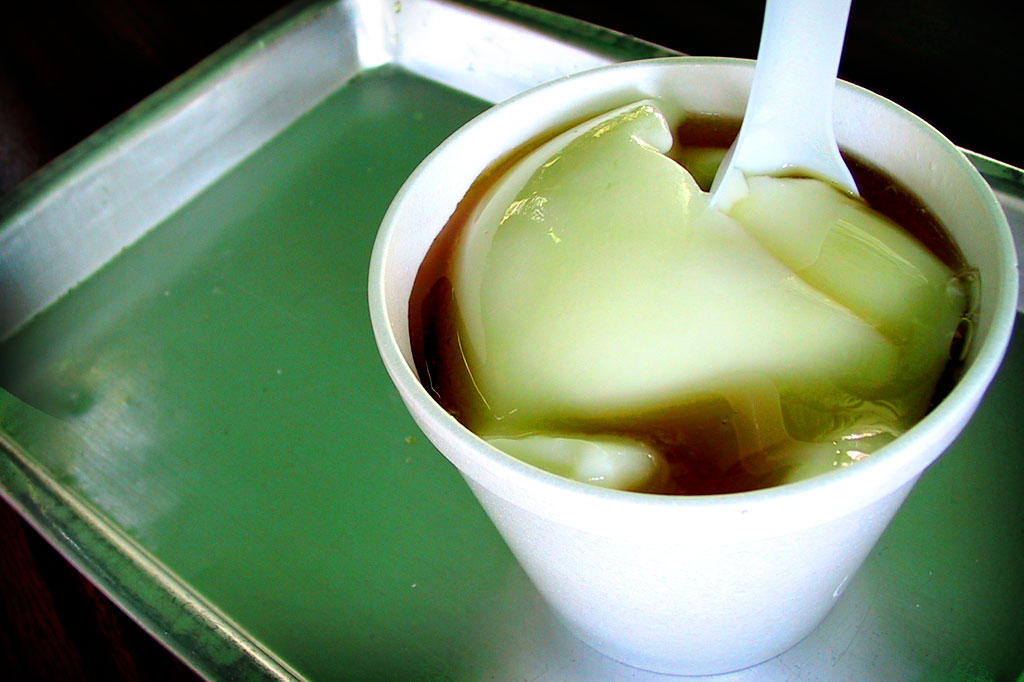
Douhua (豆花), is a soft tofu dish. The fresh tofu is served warm and dressed with sweet syrup.

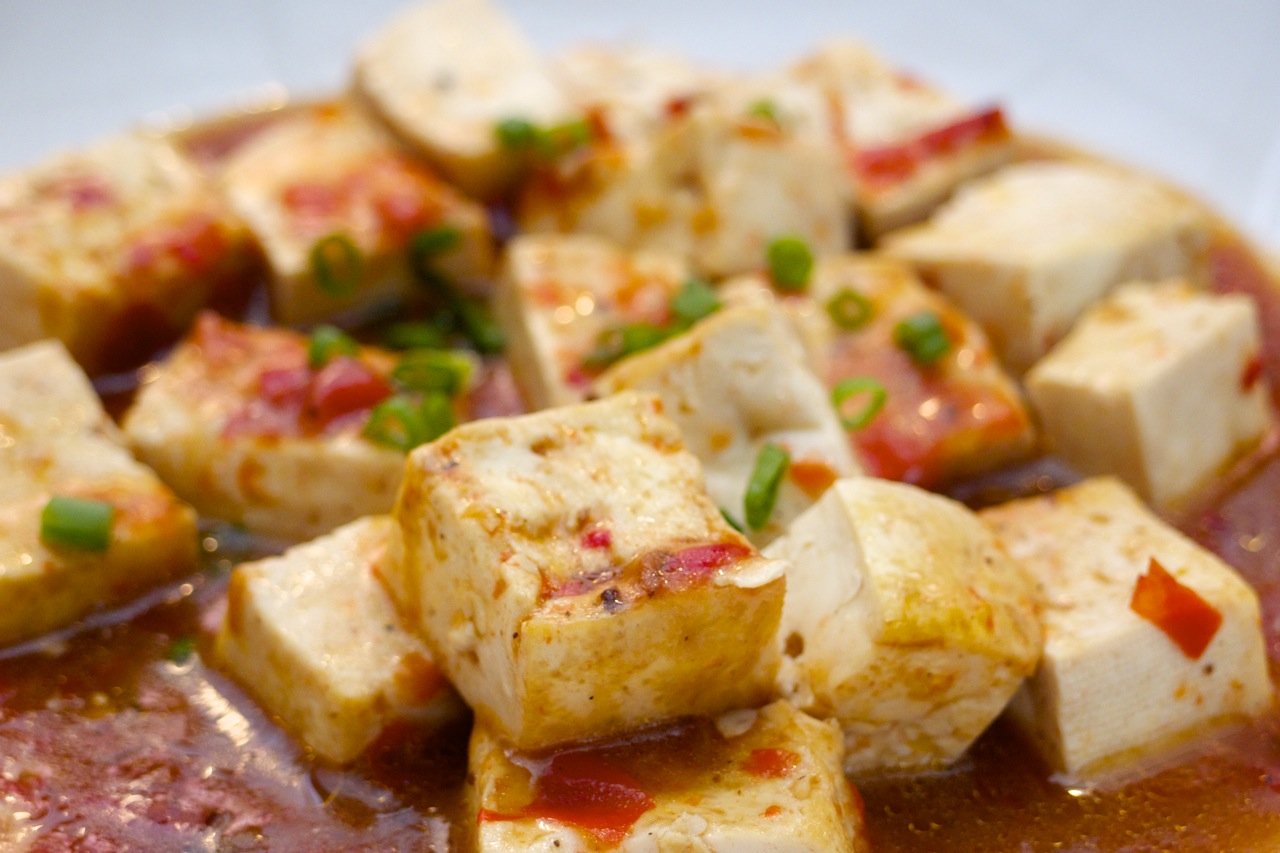
A dish prepared from Sichuan-style tofu

Tofu in Mongolian barbecue

==== Japan ====
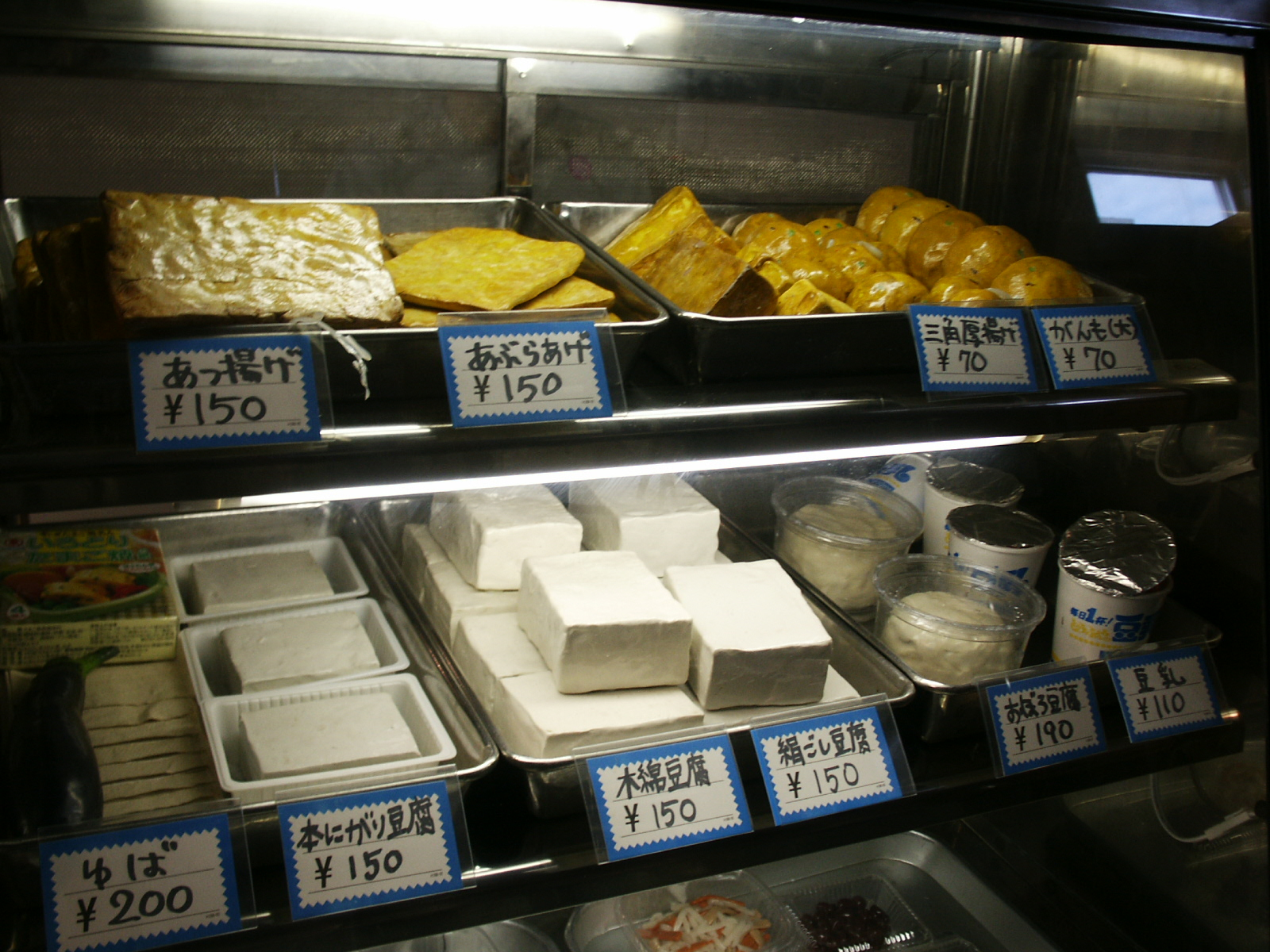
Tofu varieties sold at a shop

In Japan, a common lunch in the summer months is hiyayakko (冷奴), silken or firm East Asian tofu served with freshly grated ginger, green onions, or katsuobushi shavings with soy sauce. In the winter, tofu is frequently eaten as yudofu, which is simmered in a clay pot in kombu dashi, with vegetables such as Chinese cabbage or green onion.

Deep fried tofu is called atsuage (厚揚げ) or namaage (生揚げ) in Japan. The thinner variety called aburaage (油揚げ), develops a tofu pouch often used for inarizushi.

In Japan, cubes of lightly coated and fried tofu topped with a kombu dashi-based sauce are called agedashi dōfu (揚げ出し豆腐). Soft tofu that has been thinly sliced and deep fried, known as aburage in Japan, is commonly blanched, seasoned with soy sauce and mirin and served in dishes such as kitsune udon.

In Gifu Prefecture, there is a local specialty called komo-dofu, which consists of tofu that has been wrapped in a komo, or mat of woven straw, which leaves its imprint on the exterior. The wrapped tofu is then boiled in soup stock. Voids within the tofu develop during the boiling process, allowing the soup stock flavor to penetrate and giving it a distinctive porous appearance.

Japanese miso soup is frequently made with tofu.

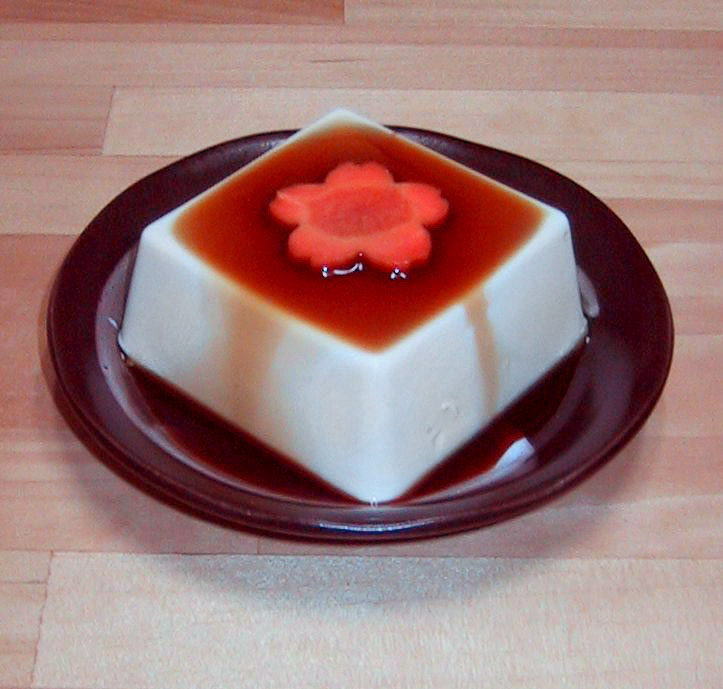
Japanese-style silken tofu with soy sauce and a decorative carrot slice

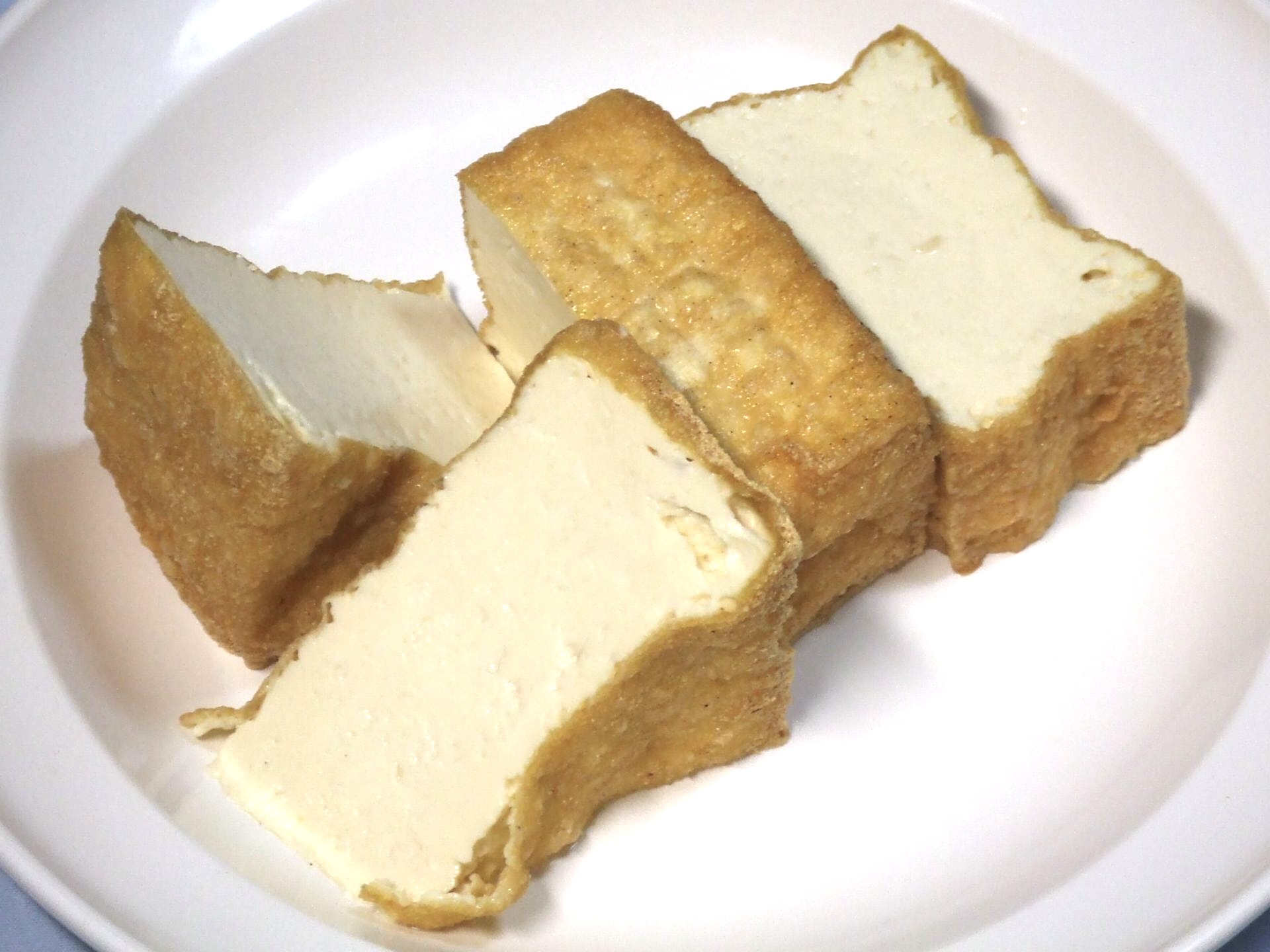
Atsuage, thick fried tofu

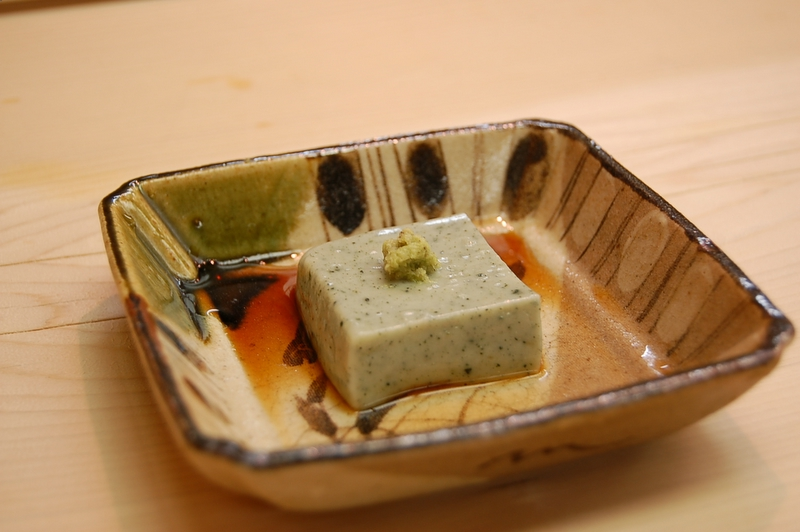
Goma tofu, made from sesame seeds and kudzu starch

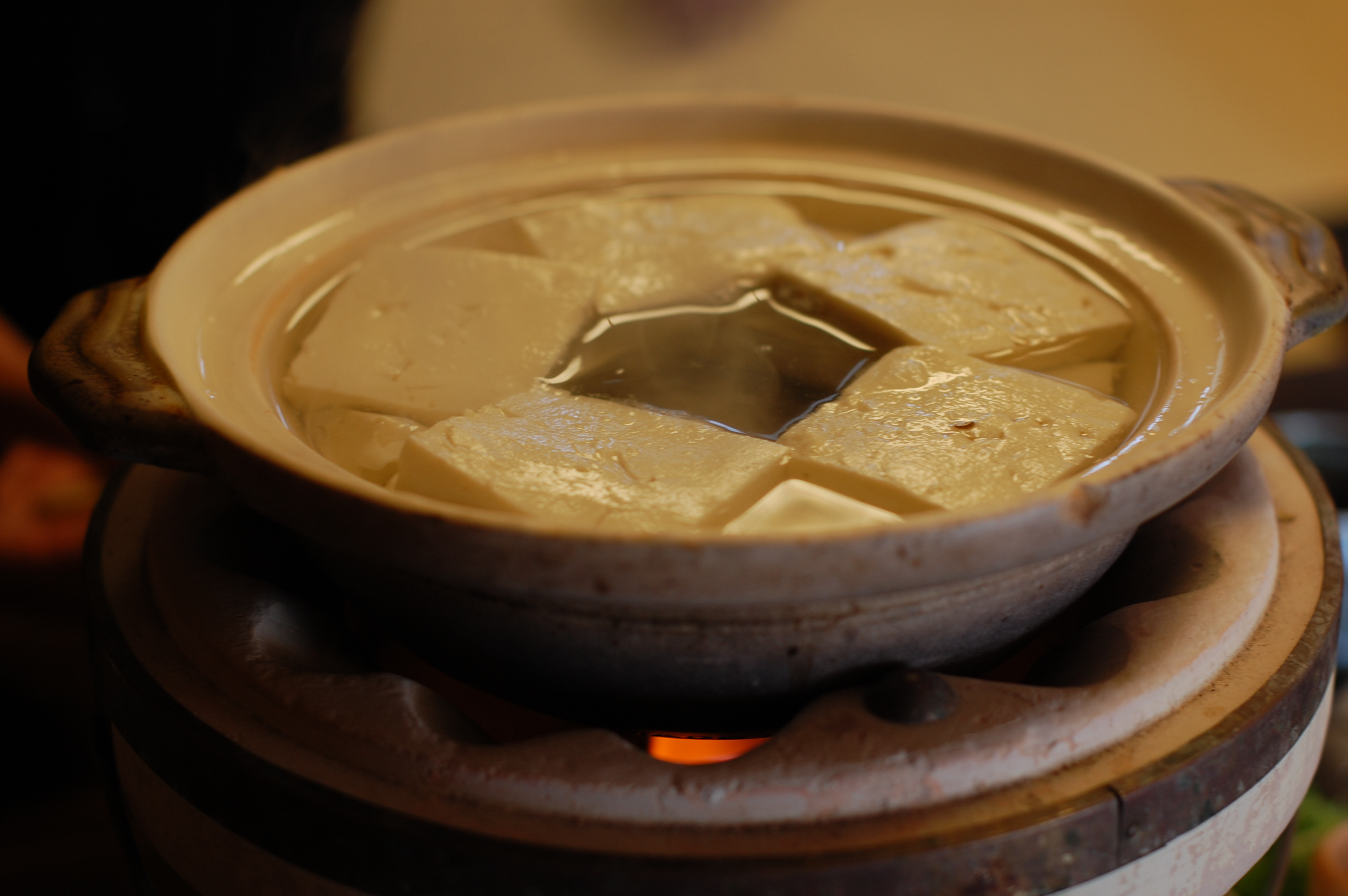
Yudofu, or tofu in hot water

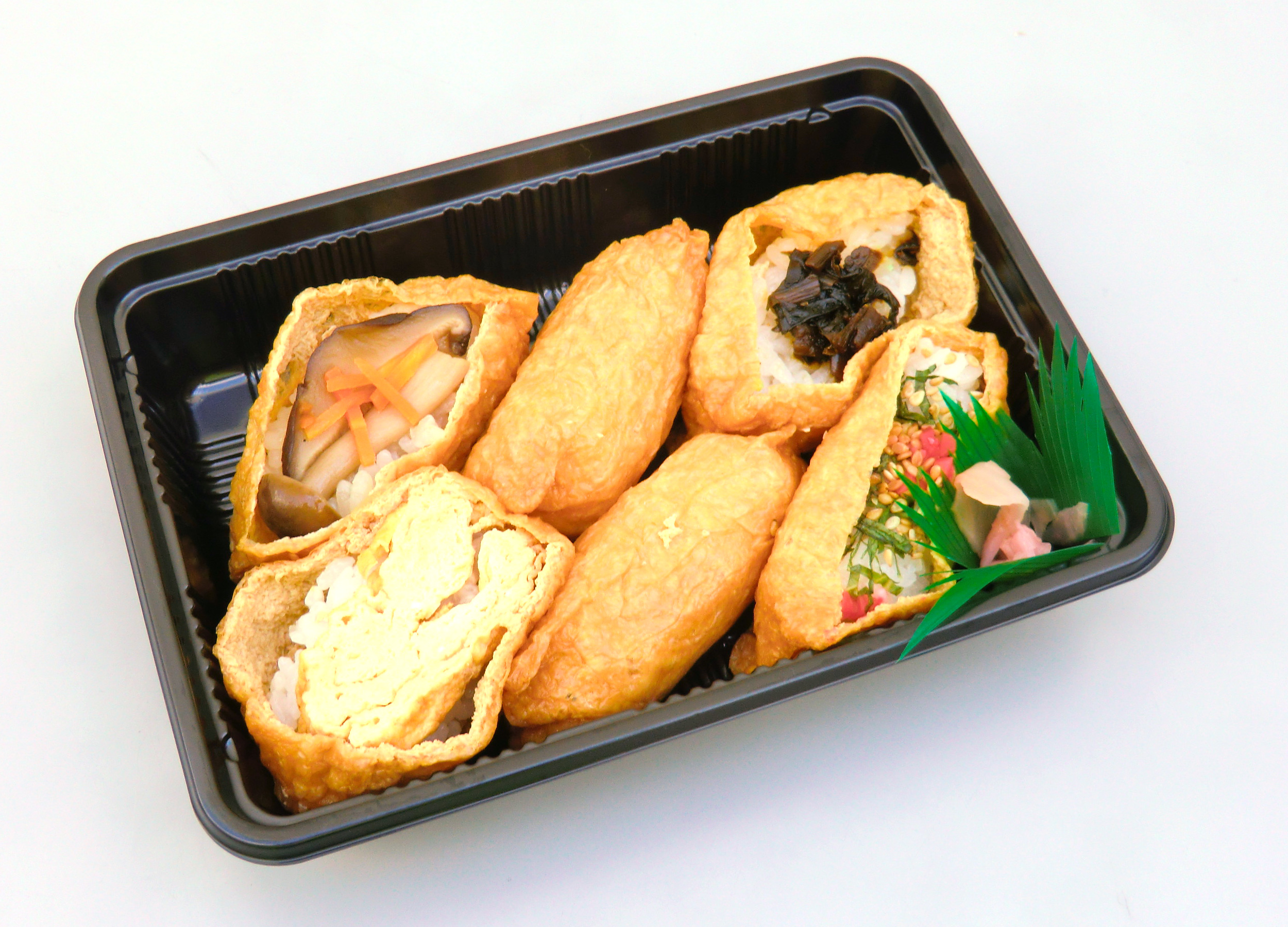
Inarizushi, tofu skin with various fillings

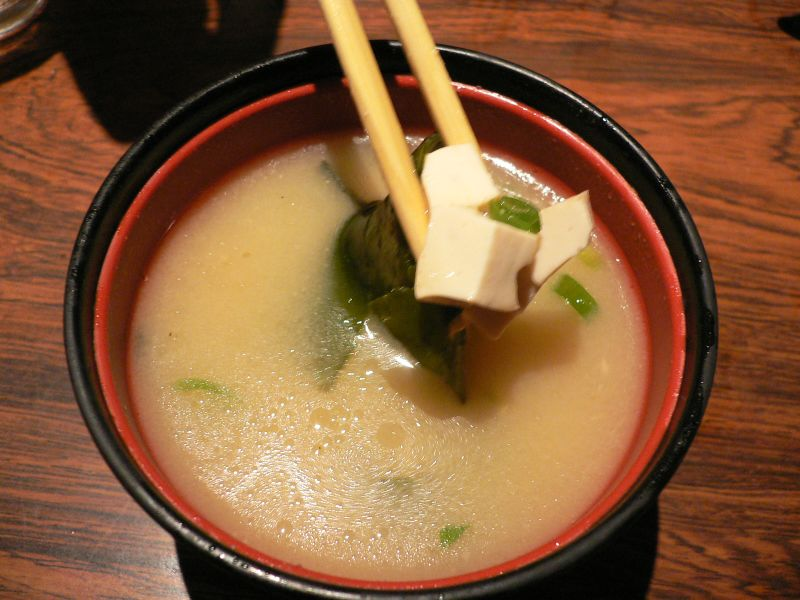
Tofu in miso soup

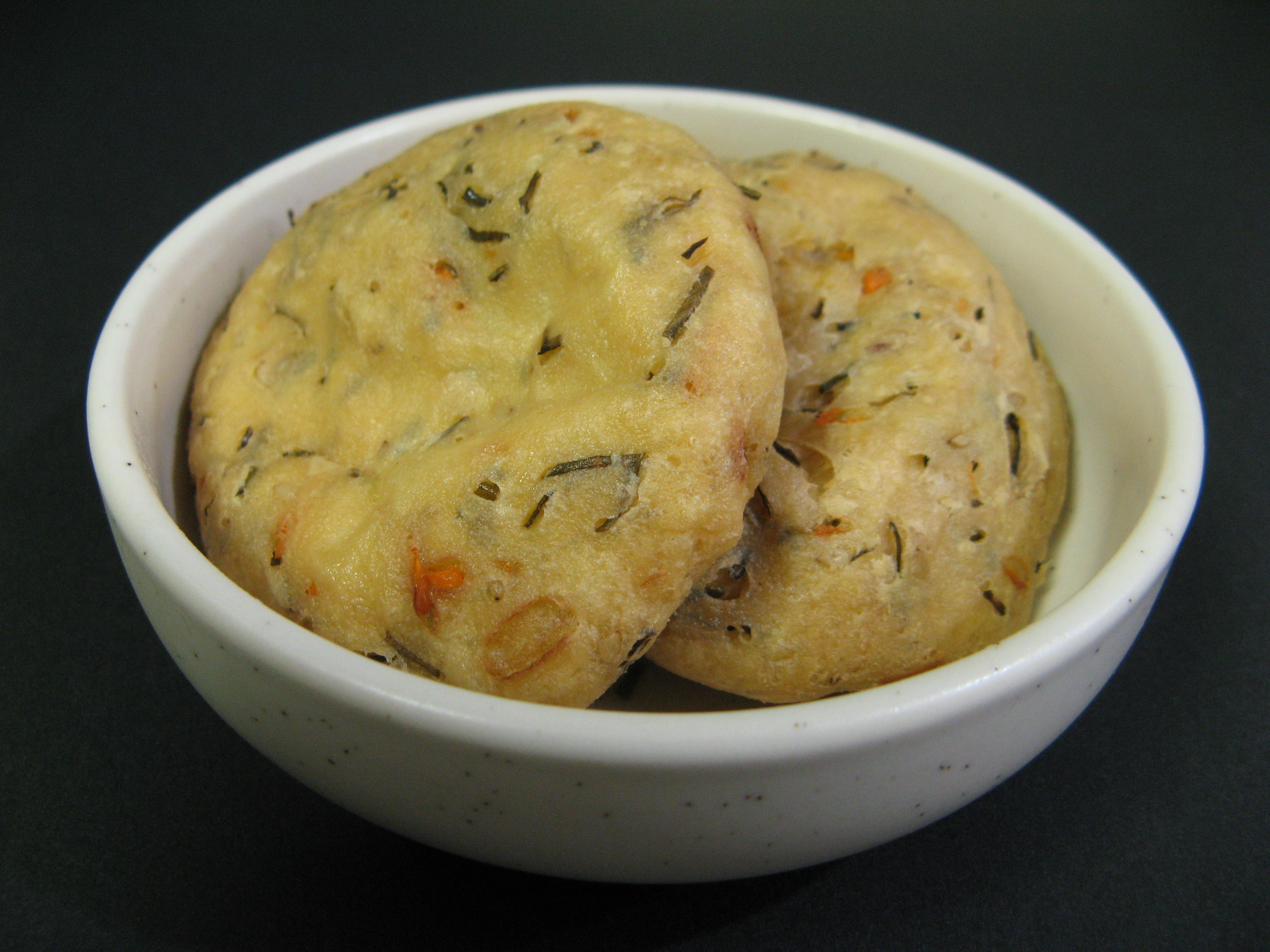
Ganmodoki (がんもどき)

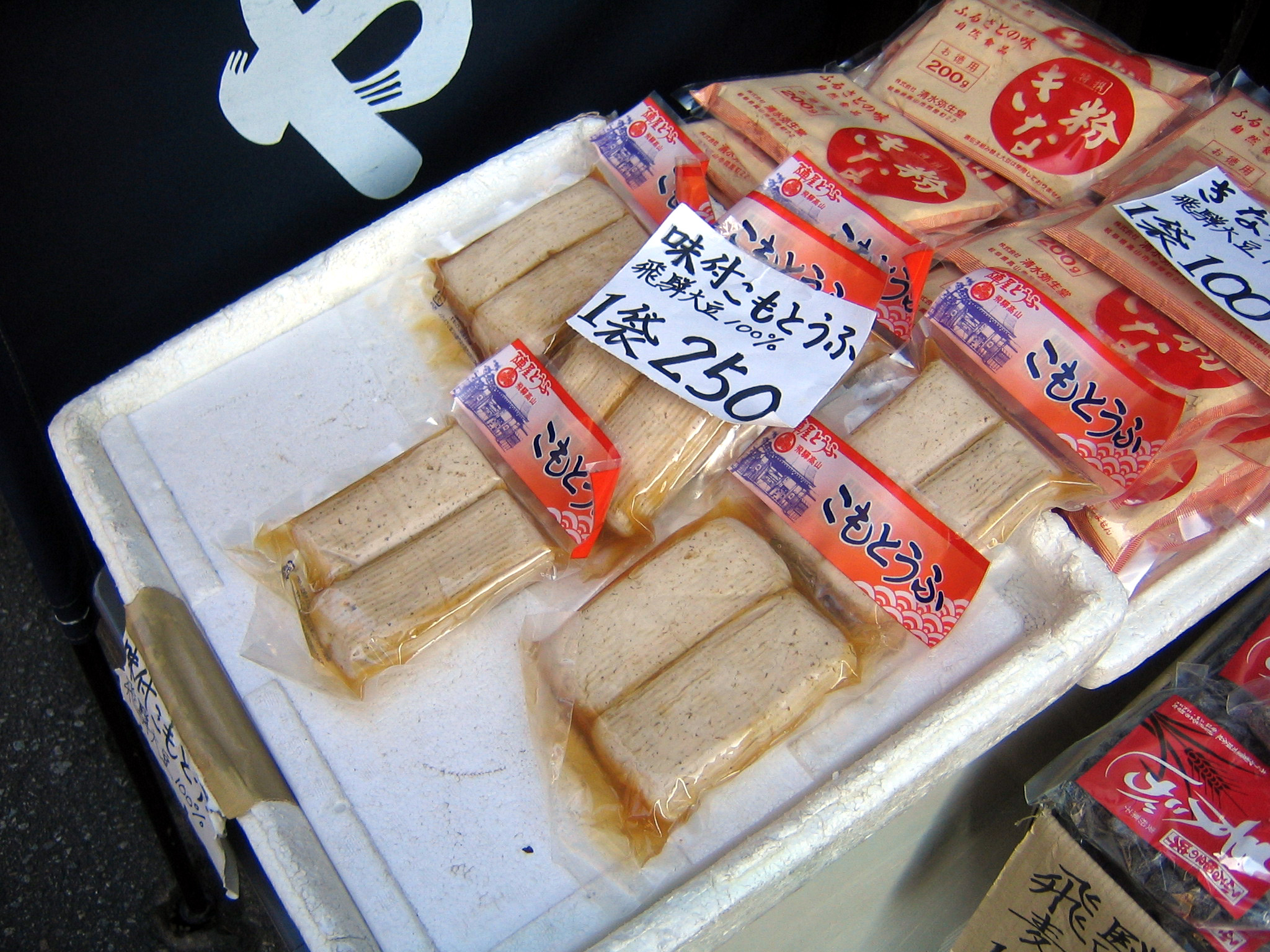
Local specialty komo-dofu on sale in a market in Takayama

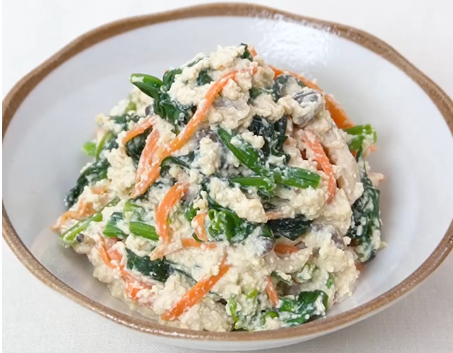
Shira-ae, a slightly sweet and smooth Japanese side dish made from mashed tofu with vegetables and konjac.

==== South Korea ====
Dubu plays an important part in Korean cuisine. Tofu is often pan-fried and served as banchan with a dipping sauce. It is also used in many soups. Cubes of firm tofu can be seasoned with soy sauce, garlic, and other ingredients before pan-frying. A dish of tofu cubes simmered with similar spicy seasoning is called dubu-jorim. Dubu-kimchi features blanched tofu served in rectangular slices around the edges of a plate with pan-fried kimchi. This is a popular food to accompany alcoholic drinks (anju). Soft, unpressed sun-dubu is used as the main ingredient of sundubu-jjigae (soft tofu stew), while other soups and stews such as doenjang-guk (soybean paste soup), doenjang-jjigae (soybean paste stew), and kimchi-jjigae (kimchi stew) tend to have diced firm tofu in them. As in many other East Asian countries, tofu is also enjoyed in a hot pot dish called dubu-jeongol (tofu hot pot).

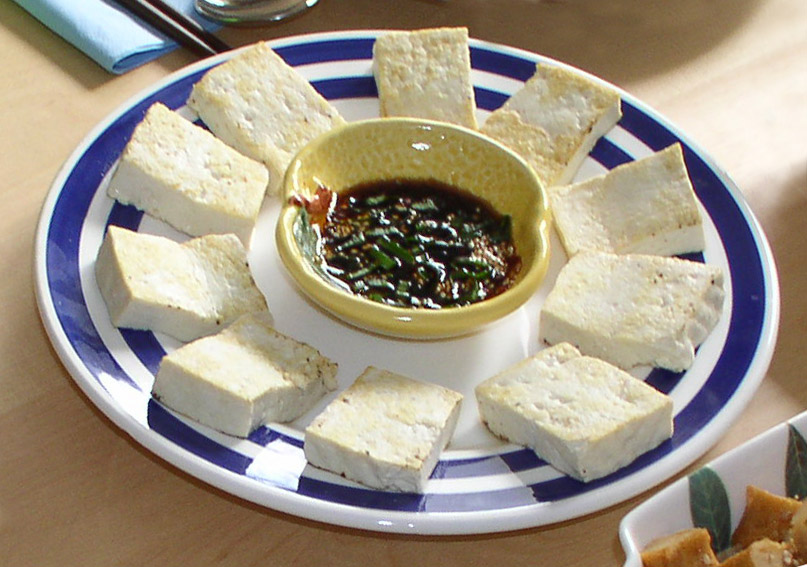
Pan-fried tofu served with seasoned soy sauce for dipping

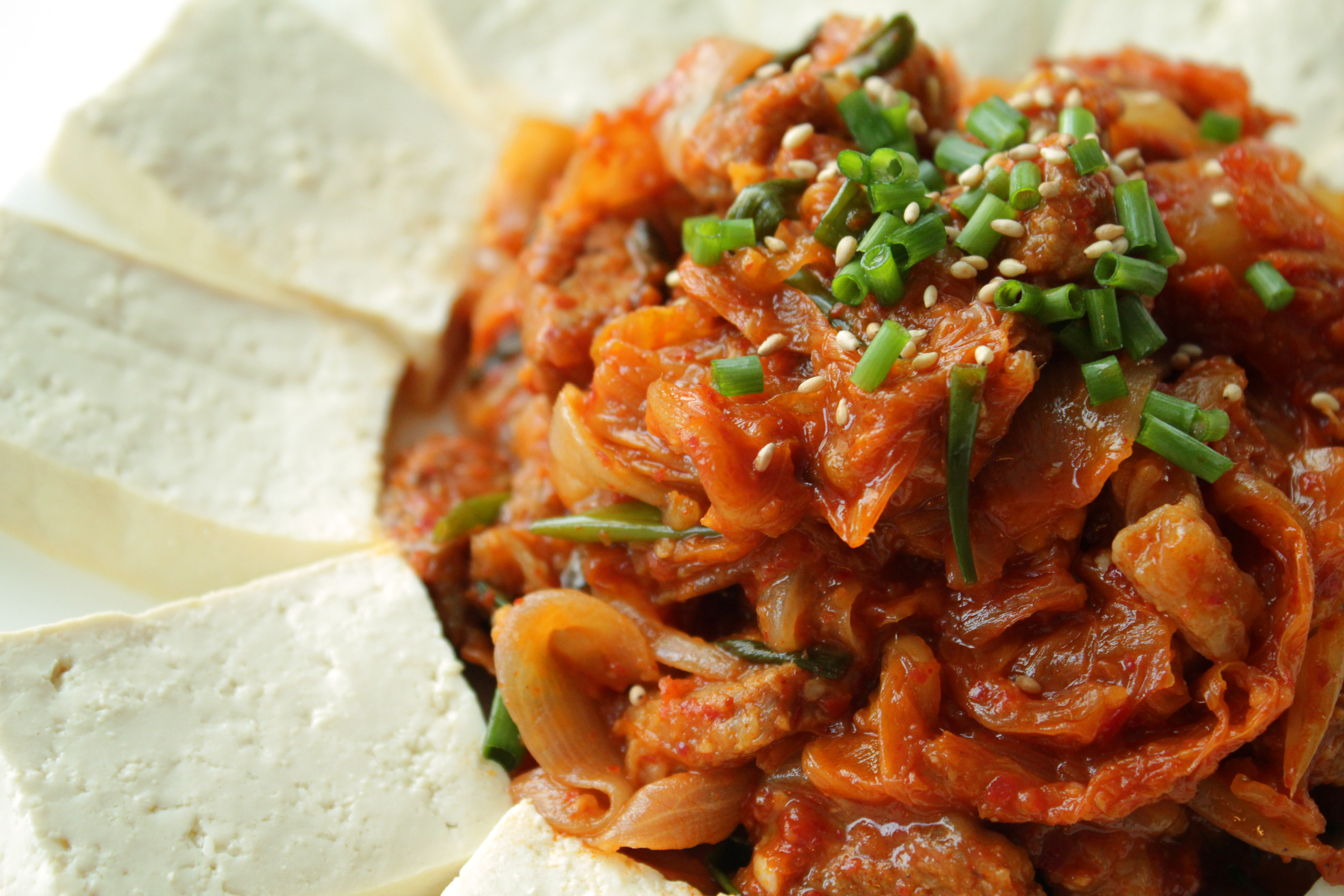
Dubu-kimchi (blanched tofu served with stir-fried kimchi)

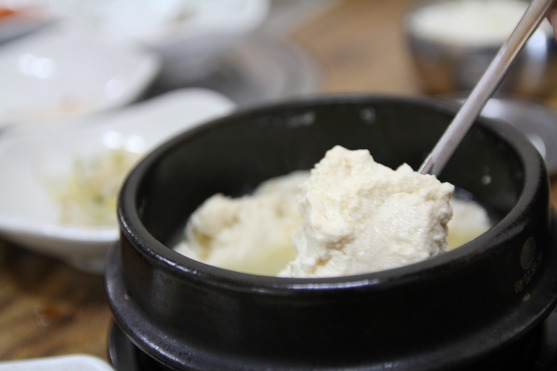
Boiled sun-dubu (extra soft tofu) served in ttukbaegi

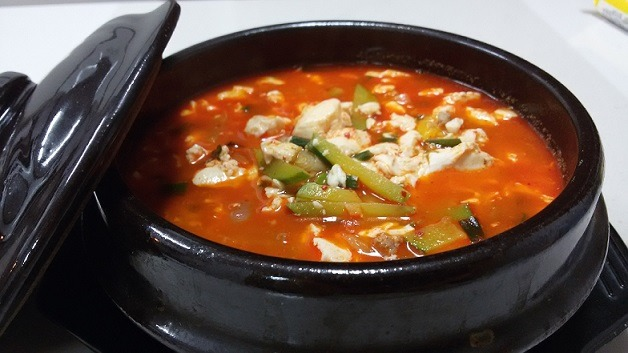
Sundubu-jjigae (spicy soft tofu stew)

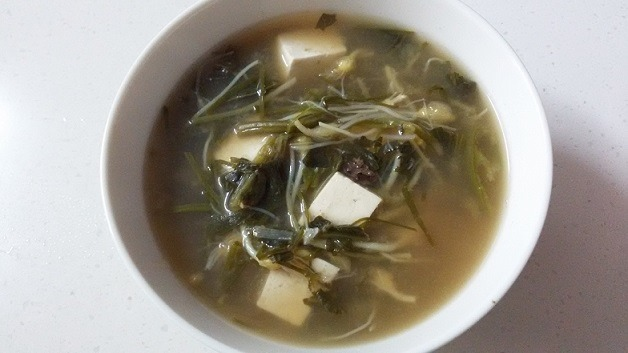
Dallae-doenjang-guk (soybean paste soup with wild chives and tofu)

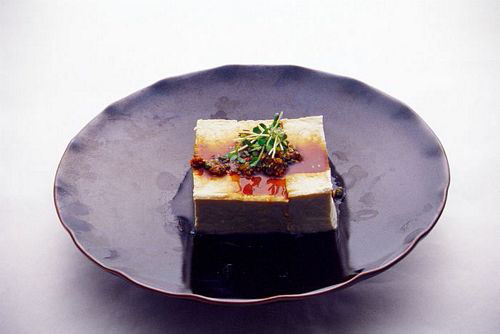
Chilled tofu served with soy sauce seasonings

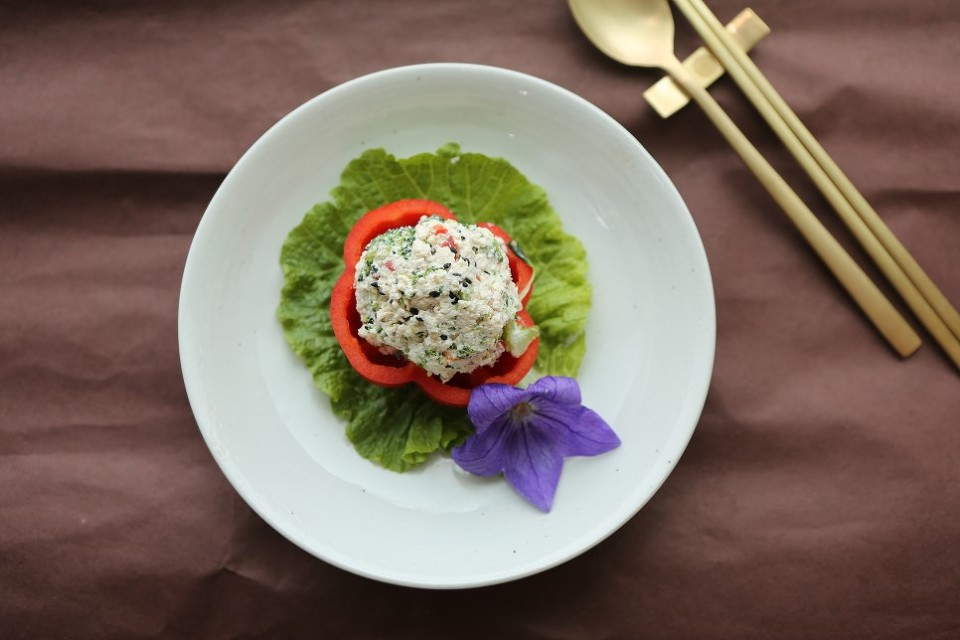
Crumbled tofu and mashed broccoli salad

=== Southeast Asia ===
Tofu is called tauhu in Malaysia and Singapore as well as tahu in Indonesia both from Hokkien tāu-hū; it is also known as taufu in Malaysia from Cantonese.

Indonesia, Thailand, Malaysia, and the Philippines are major producers of tofu and have plants in many municipalities.

==== Malaysia and Singapore ====
Malaysian and Singaporean Indians use tofu in various dishes such as mee goreng, rojak, and pasembor. Peranakan cuisine often uses tofu, as in Penang curry noodles and laksa.

Tofu puffs are common in a type of begedil known as tauhu begedil.

==== Indonesia ====
In Indonesian markets, tofu is usually available in two forms: tahu putih or common white firm tofu; and tahu goreng or fried tofu that has developed a brown skin. Tofu is usually fried in palm oil. Although pre-fried tofu is often sold cold, it is seldom eaten directly and requires additional cooking.

Tahu yun yi or tahu Bandung is yellow tofu colored with turmeric.

Popular Indonesian tofu dishes include tahu gejrot and kupat tahu of West Java. Tahu gejrot is tahu pong type of hollow fried tofu cut into small pieces, served with a thin, watery dressing made by blending palm sugar, vinegar, and sweet soy sauce, garnished with chili pepper, garlic, and shallot. Kupat tahu is slices of tofu served with ketupat rice cake, usually in peanut sauce dressing. Slices of tofu are usually mixed in gado-gado, ketoprak and siomay.

Bacem is a method of cooking tofu originating in Central Java. The tofu is boiled in coconut water, mixed with galangal, Indonesian bay leaves, coriander, shallot, garlic, tamarind and palm sugar. After the spicy coconut water has completely evaporated, the tofu is fried until it is golden brown. The result is moist but rather firm, sweet, and spicy tofu. This cooked tofu variant is commonly known as tahu bacem in Indonesian. Tahu bacem is commonly prepared along with tempeh and chicken.

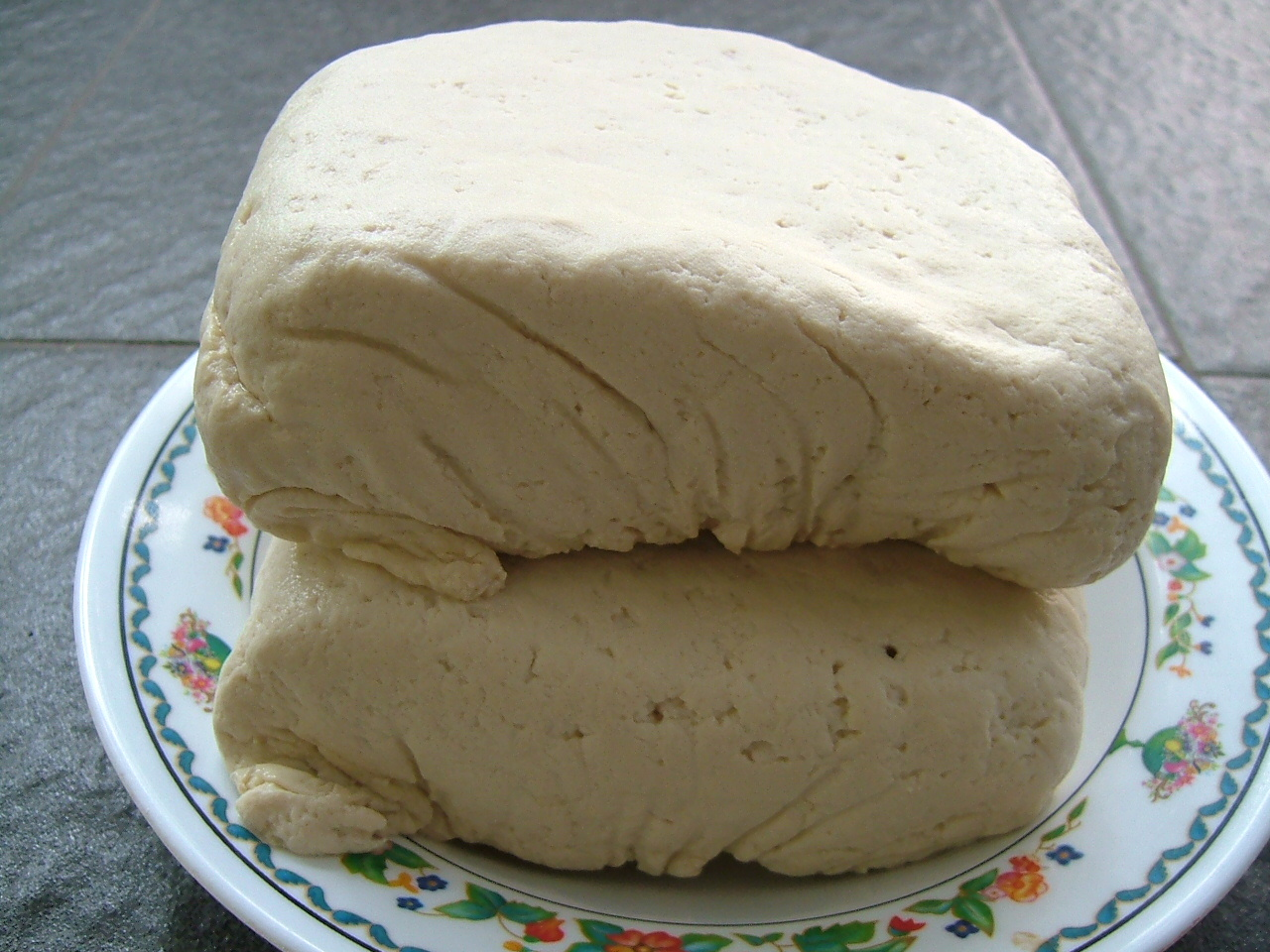
Tahu putih (firm white tofu)

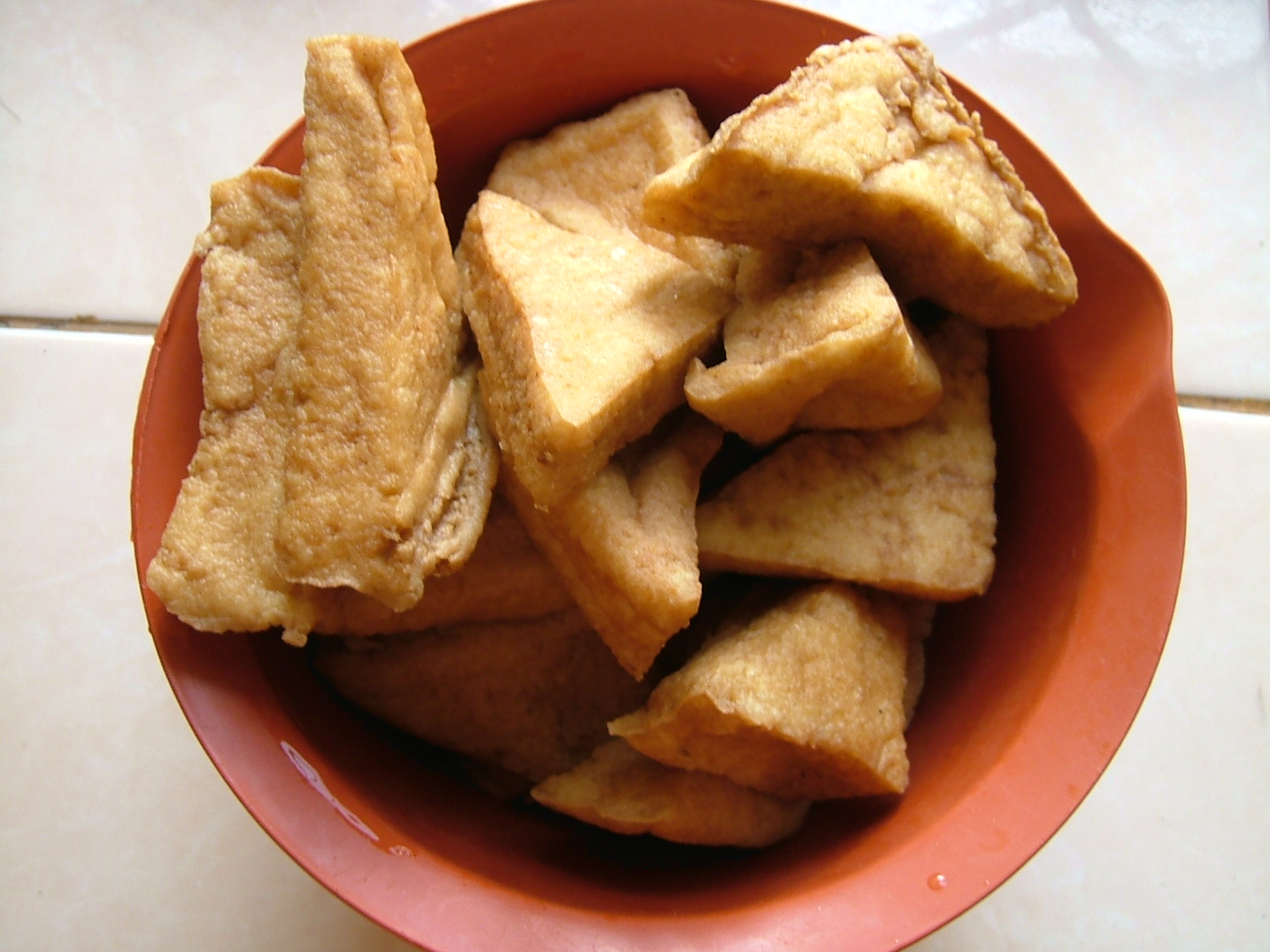
Tahu goreng (fried tofu) has brown skin.

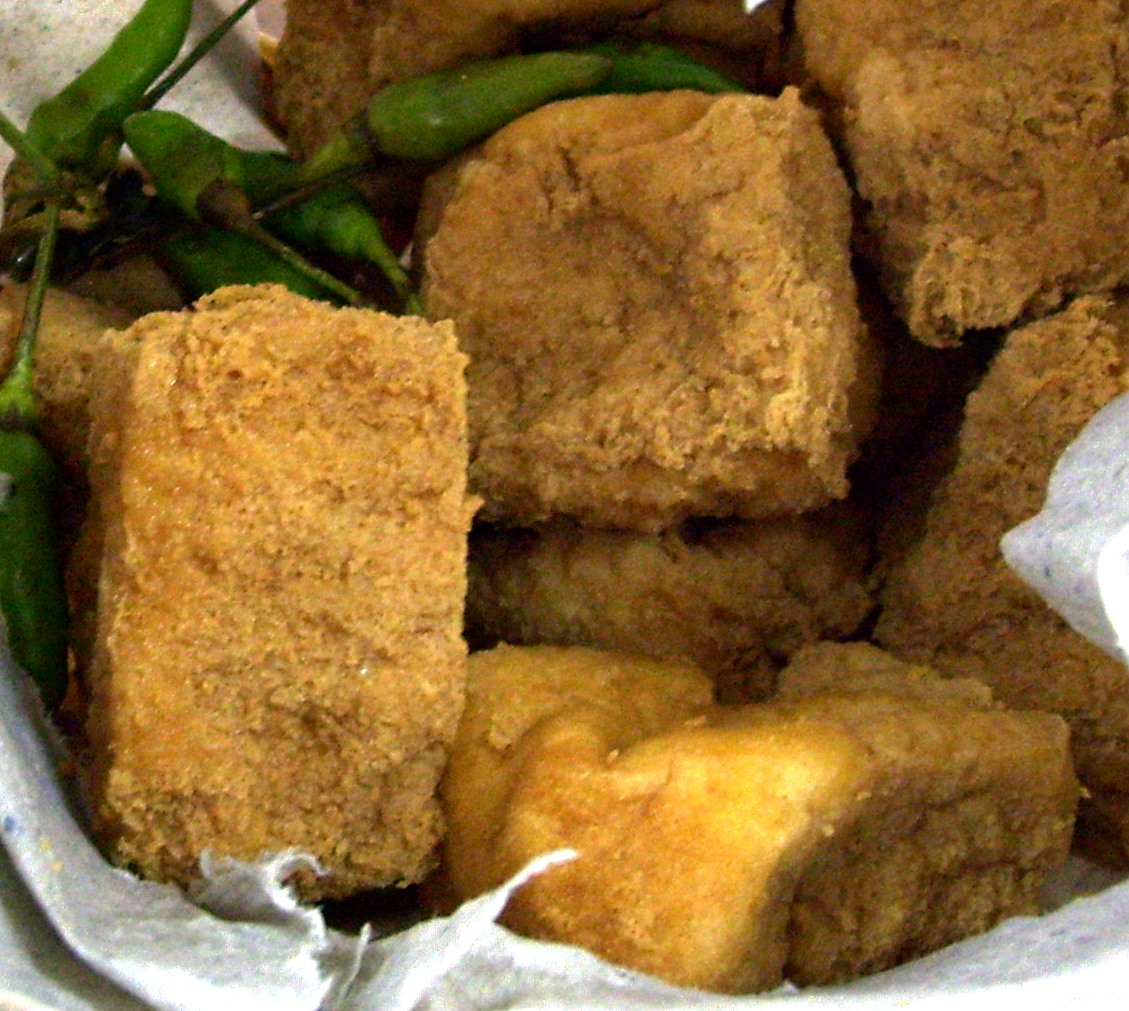
Tahu sumedang with bird's eye chili

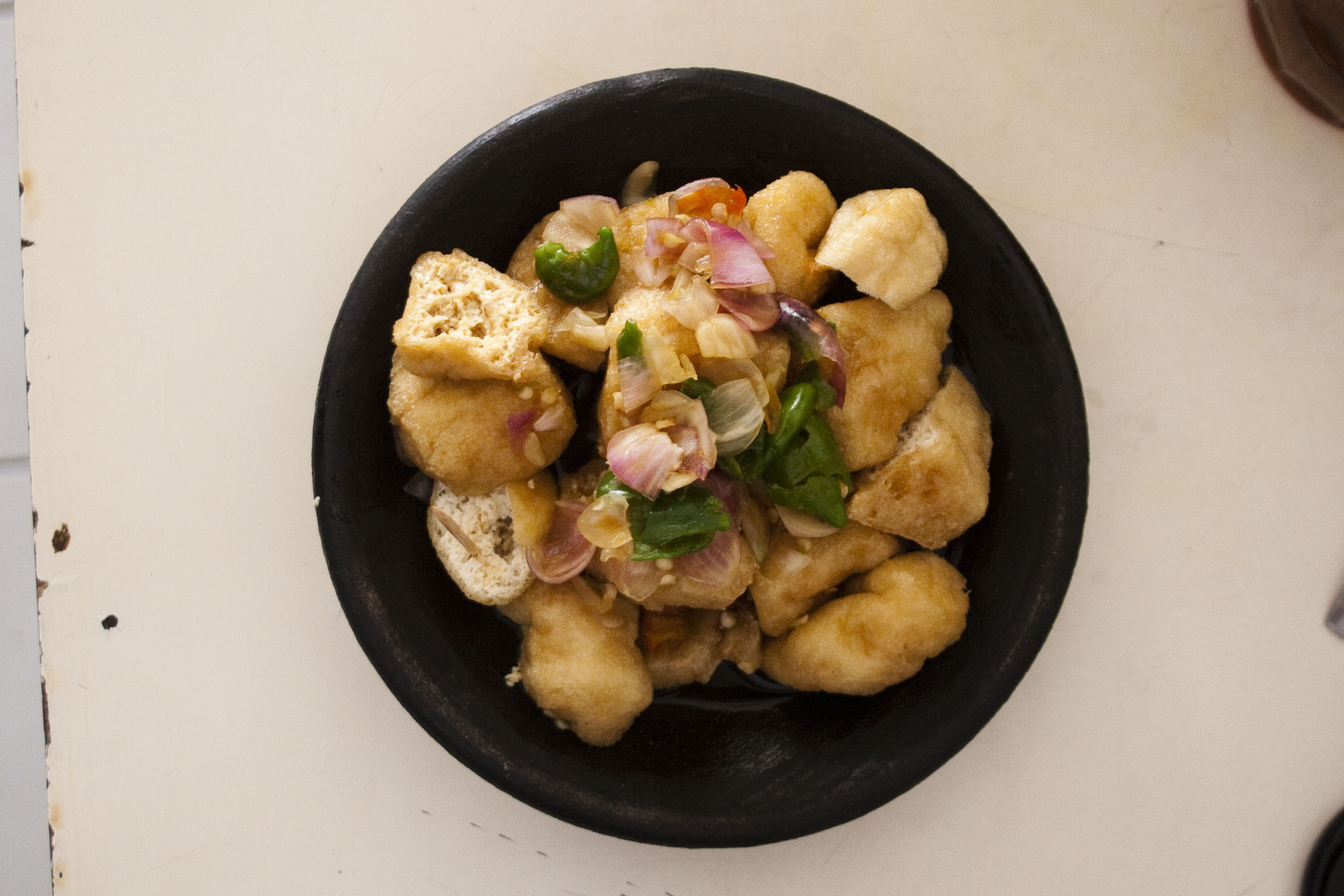
Tahu gejrot with thin light spicy sauce

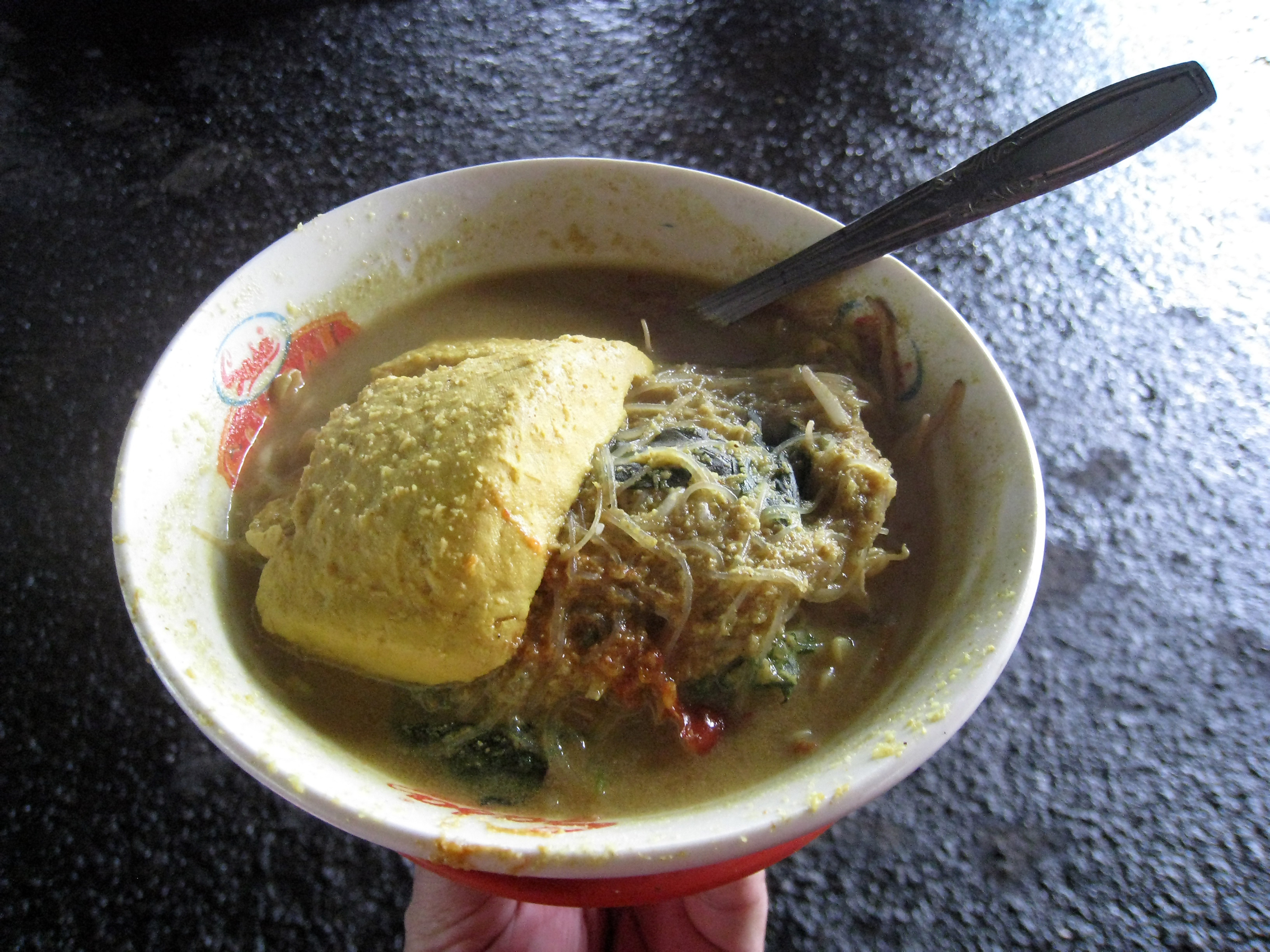
Yellow tofu (tofu colored with turmeric) on top of laksa

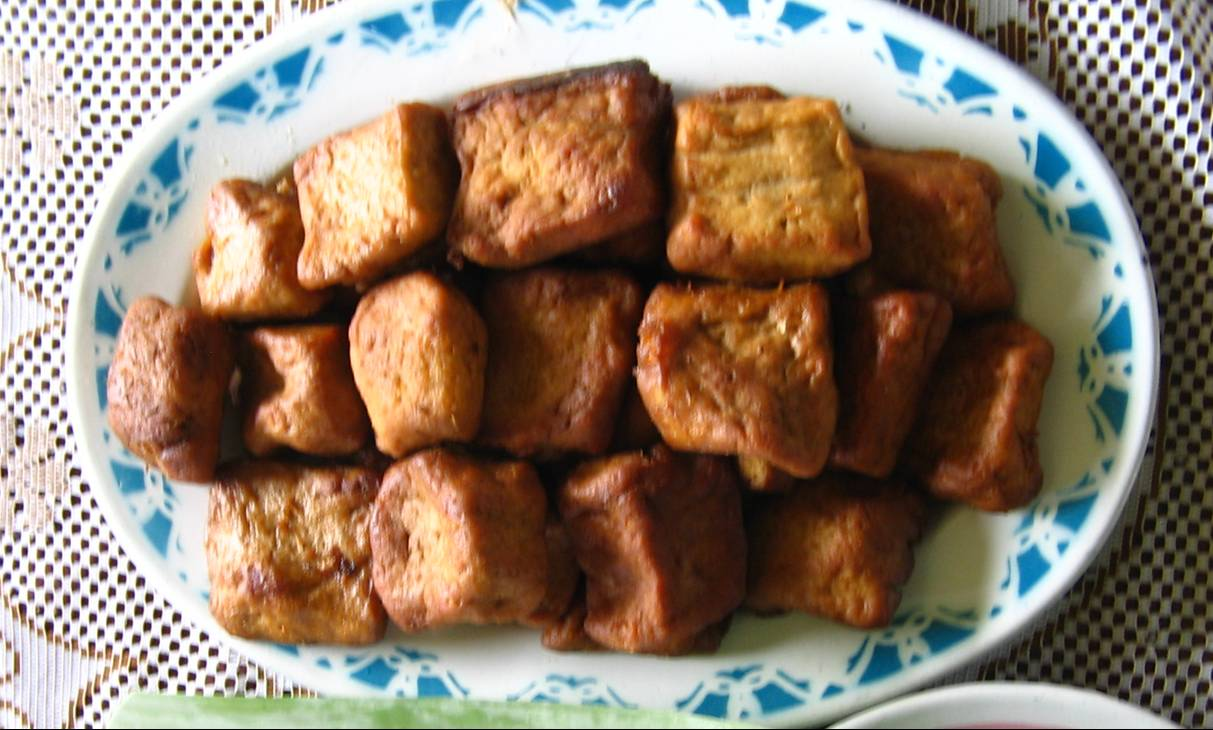
Tahu bacem, tofu simmered in palm sugar and spices

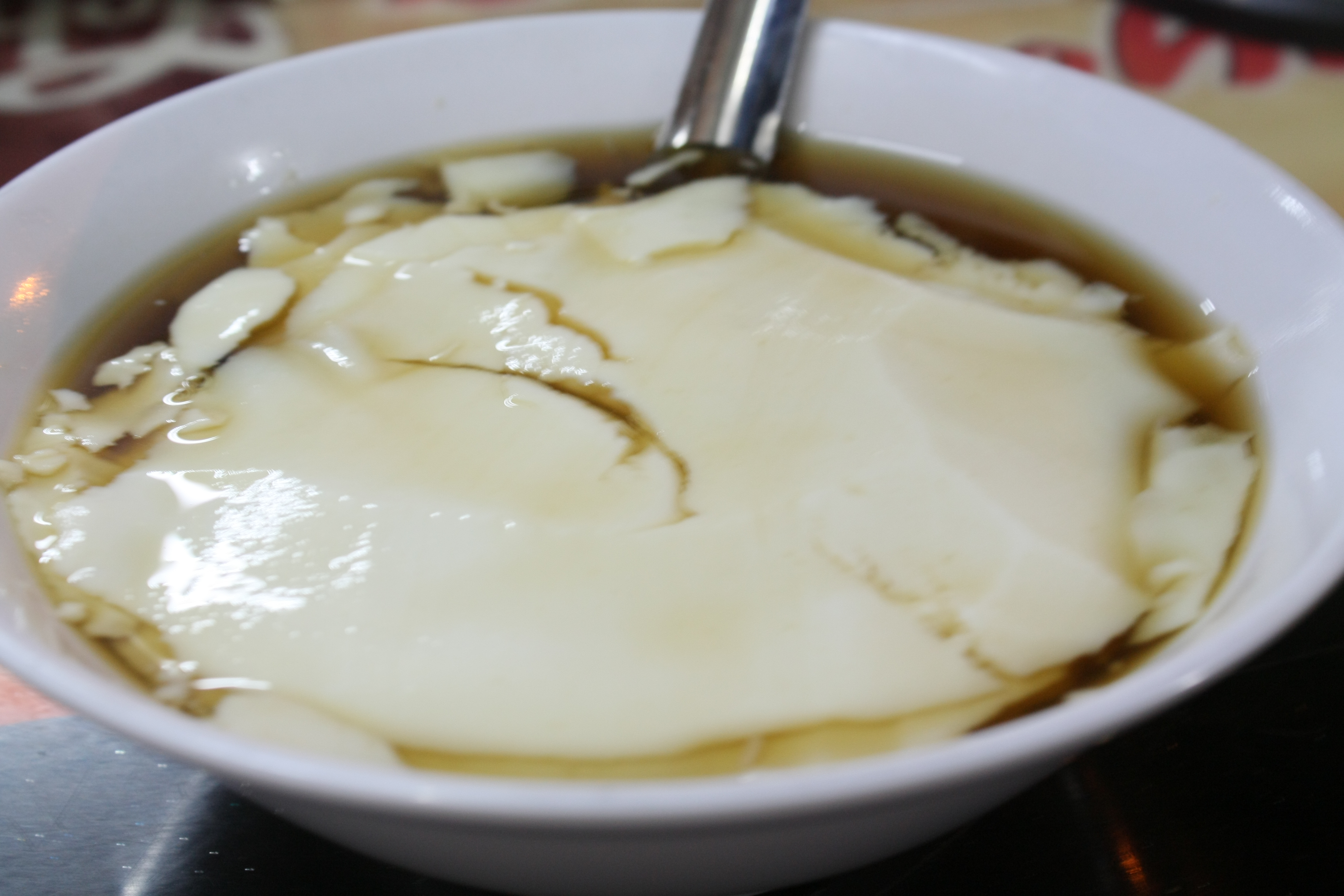
Kembang tahu, served in sweet ginger syrup

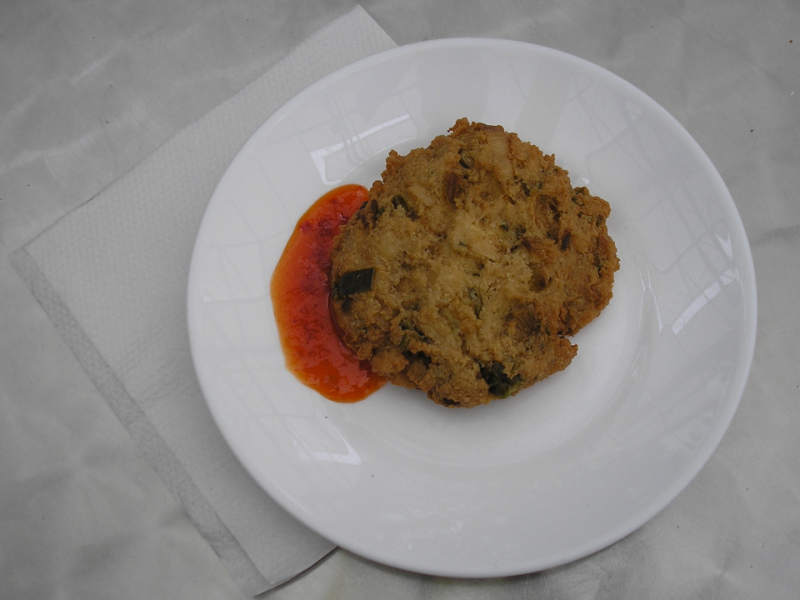
Perkedel tahu goreng (Dutch-Indonesian food based on tofu and Dutch cooking technique) Frikadeller

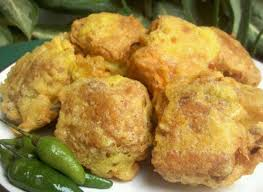
Tahu isi, Indonesian fried tofu filled with vegetable, shrimp, or chicken served with bird eye chili and sweet shrimp paste

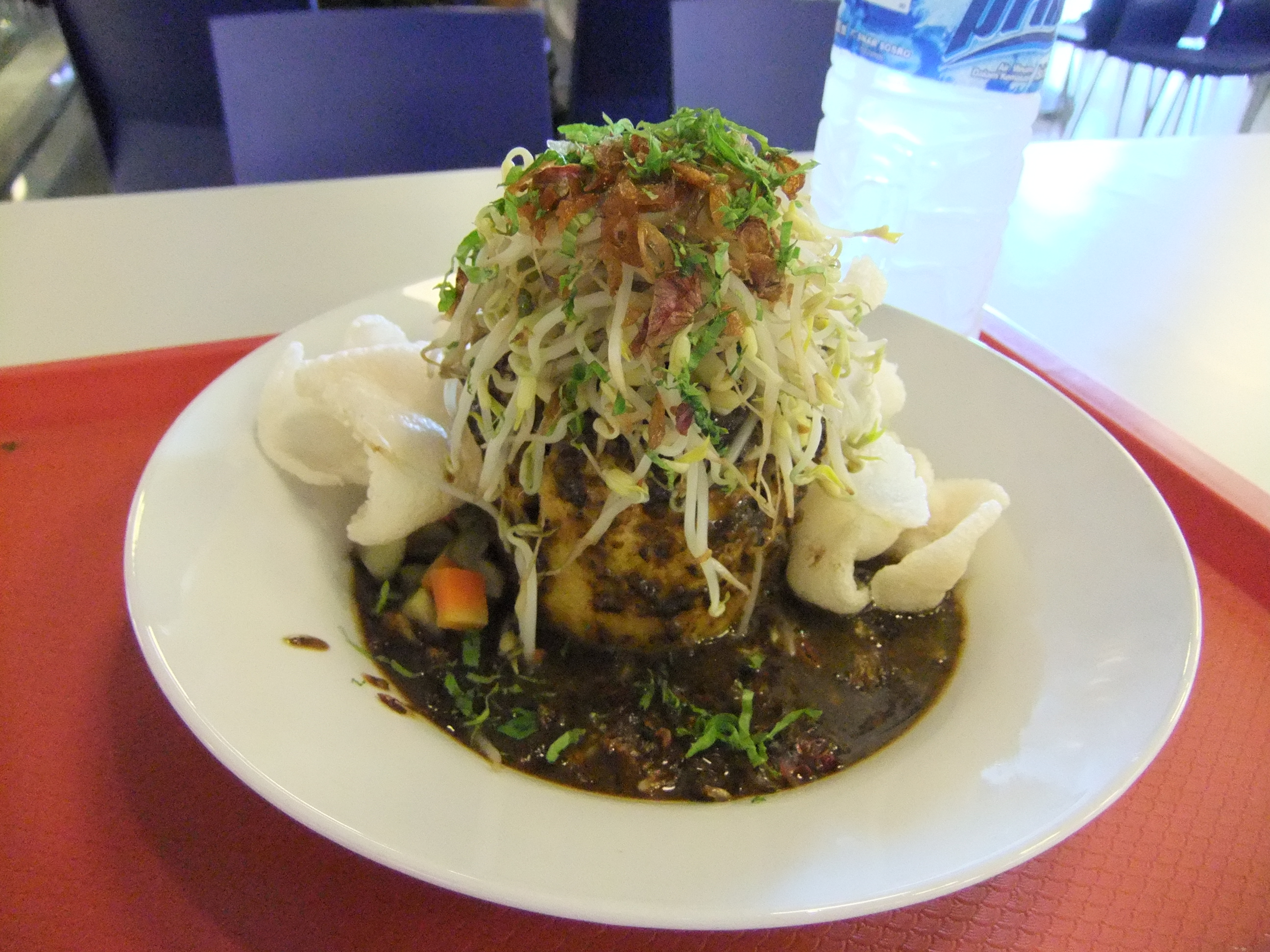
Tahu telor or Tahu tek, omelette tofu served with vegetable, krupuk, peanut sauce, shrimp paste, sweet soy sauce, and sambal

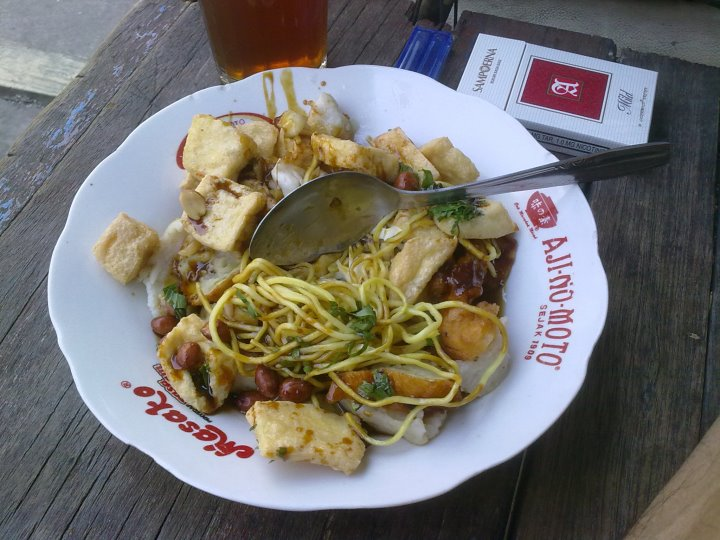
Kupat tahu, tofu served with rice cake, noodles and sweet soy sauce

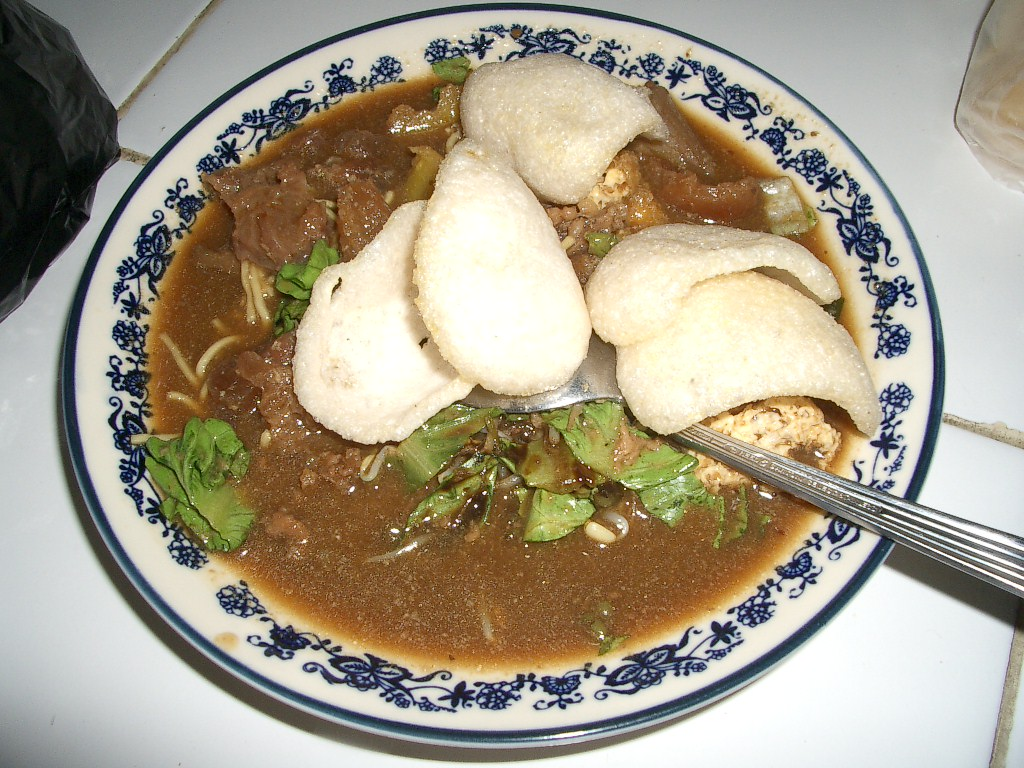
Tahu campur, tofu soup with beef and tendon served in broth, soy sauce, shrimp paste, vegetable, krupuk and sambal

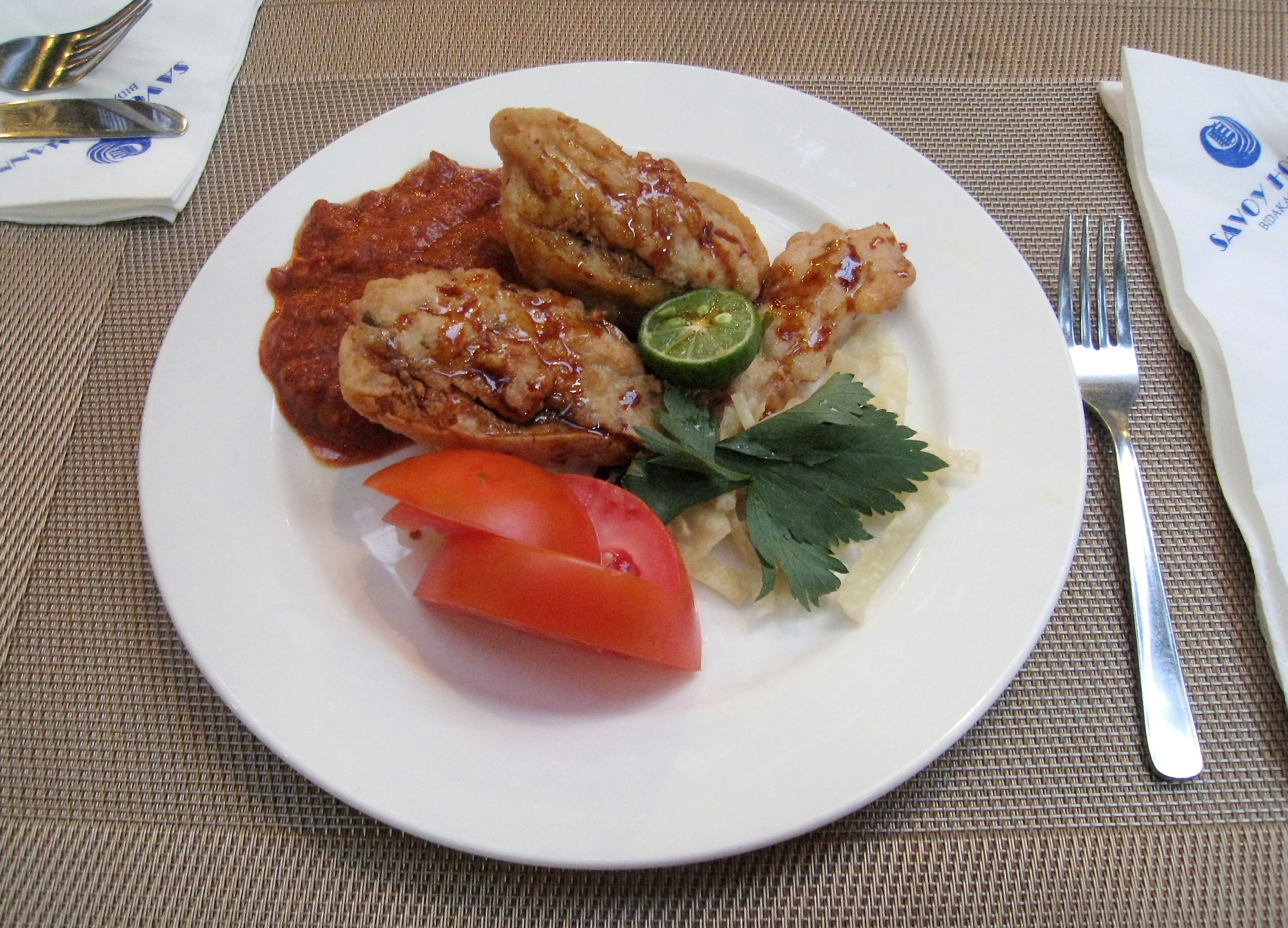
Tahu bakso or batagor, literally bakso (meatball), tahu (tofu), goreng (fried). Fried tofu filled with fish, tapioca starch, or meat.

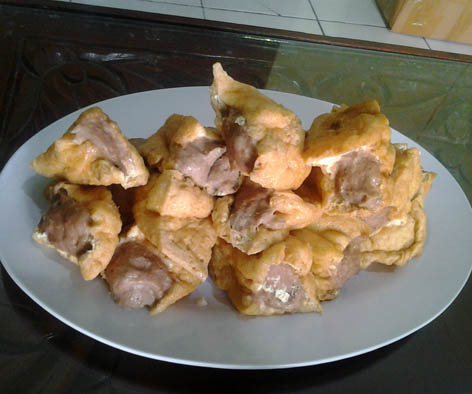
Tahu tuna, fried tofu filled with grounded tuna, a delicacy from Pacitan, East Java

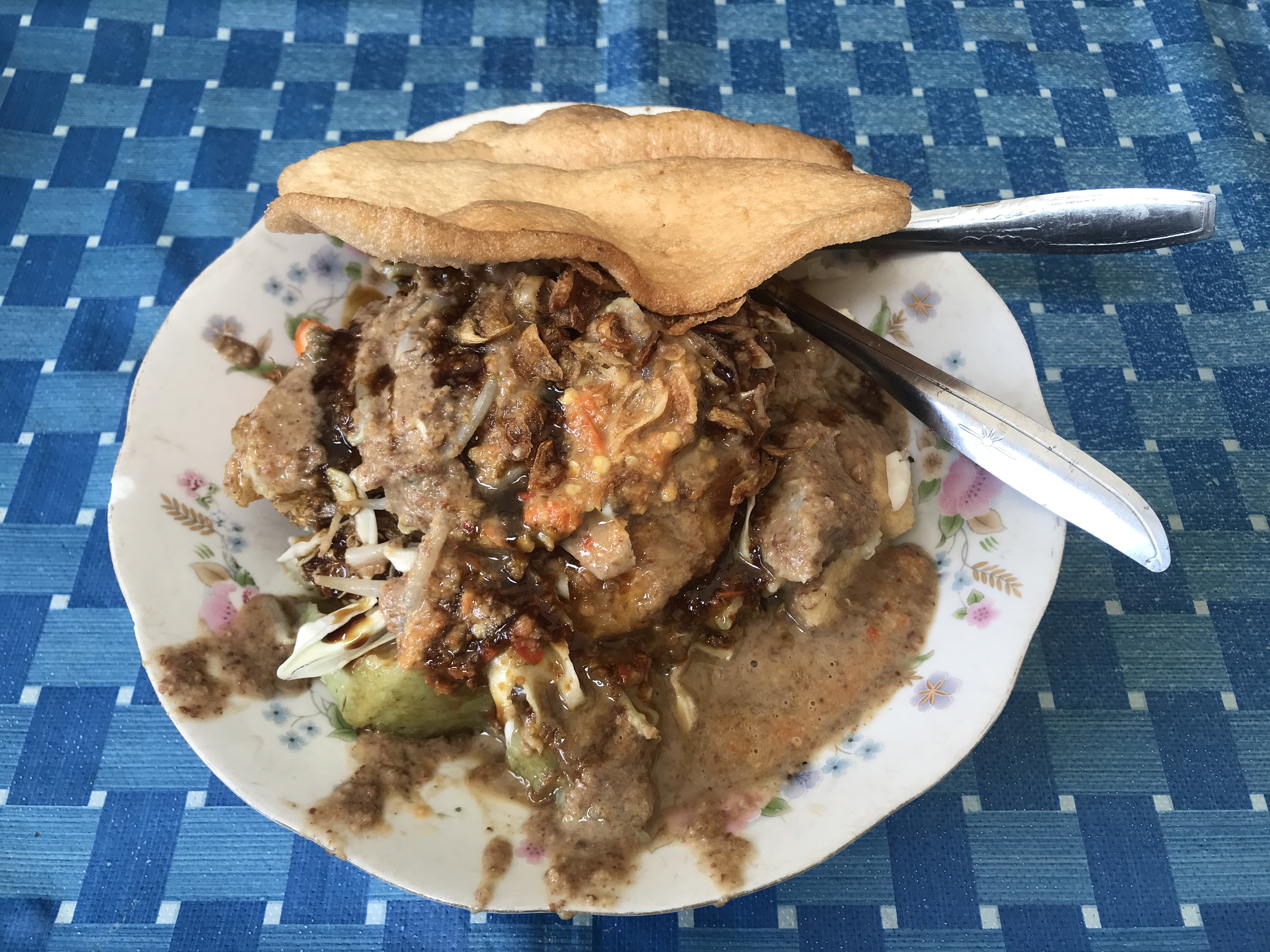
Tahu gimbal. a tofu dish with peanut sauce and gimbal (shrimp fritter) from Semarang.

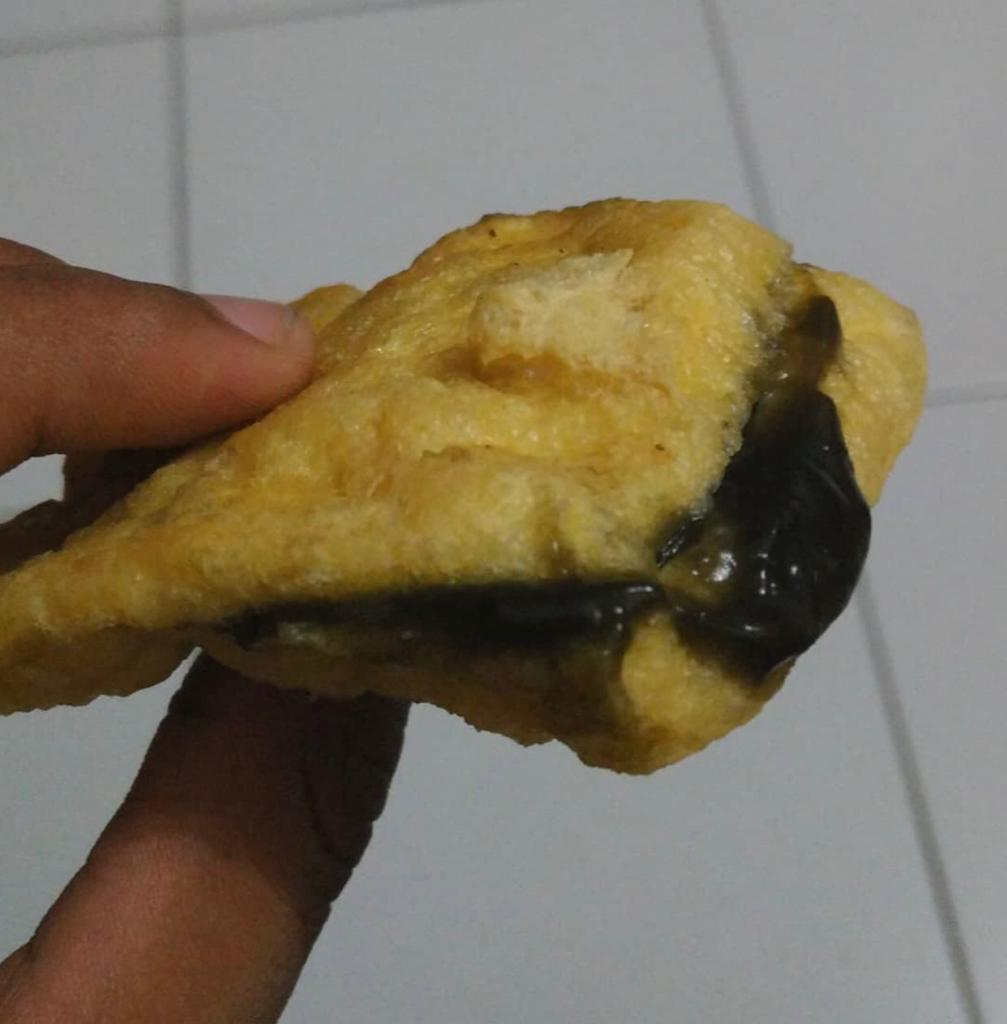
Tahu petis, fried tofu filled with petis (black colored shrimp paste sauce). Originated from Semarang, Central Java.

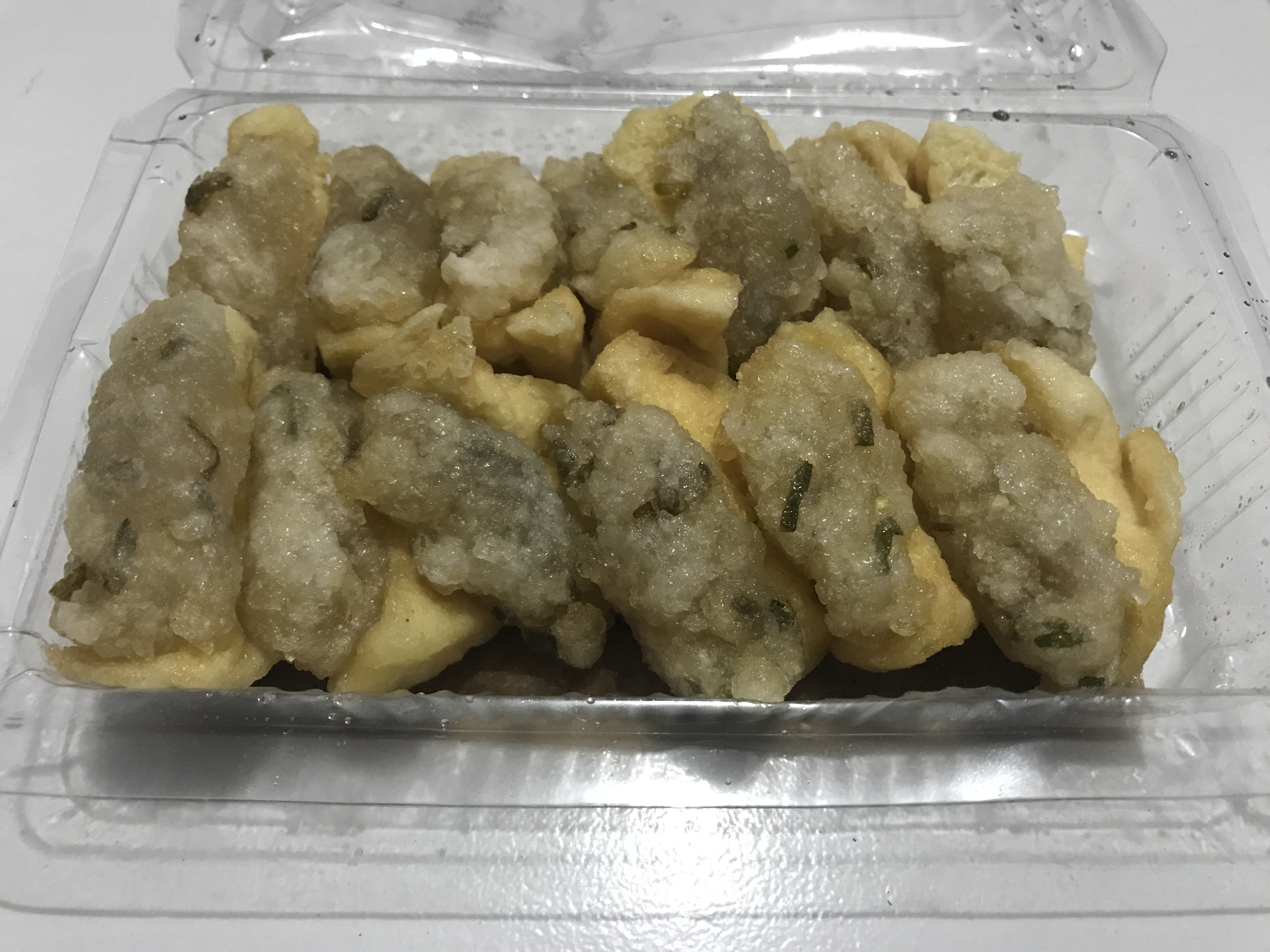
Tahu aci, fried tofu stuffed with tapioca starch. Originated from Tegal, Central Java.

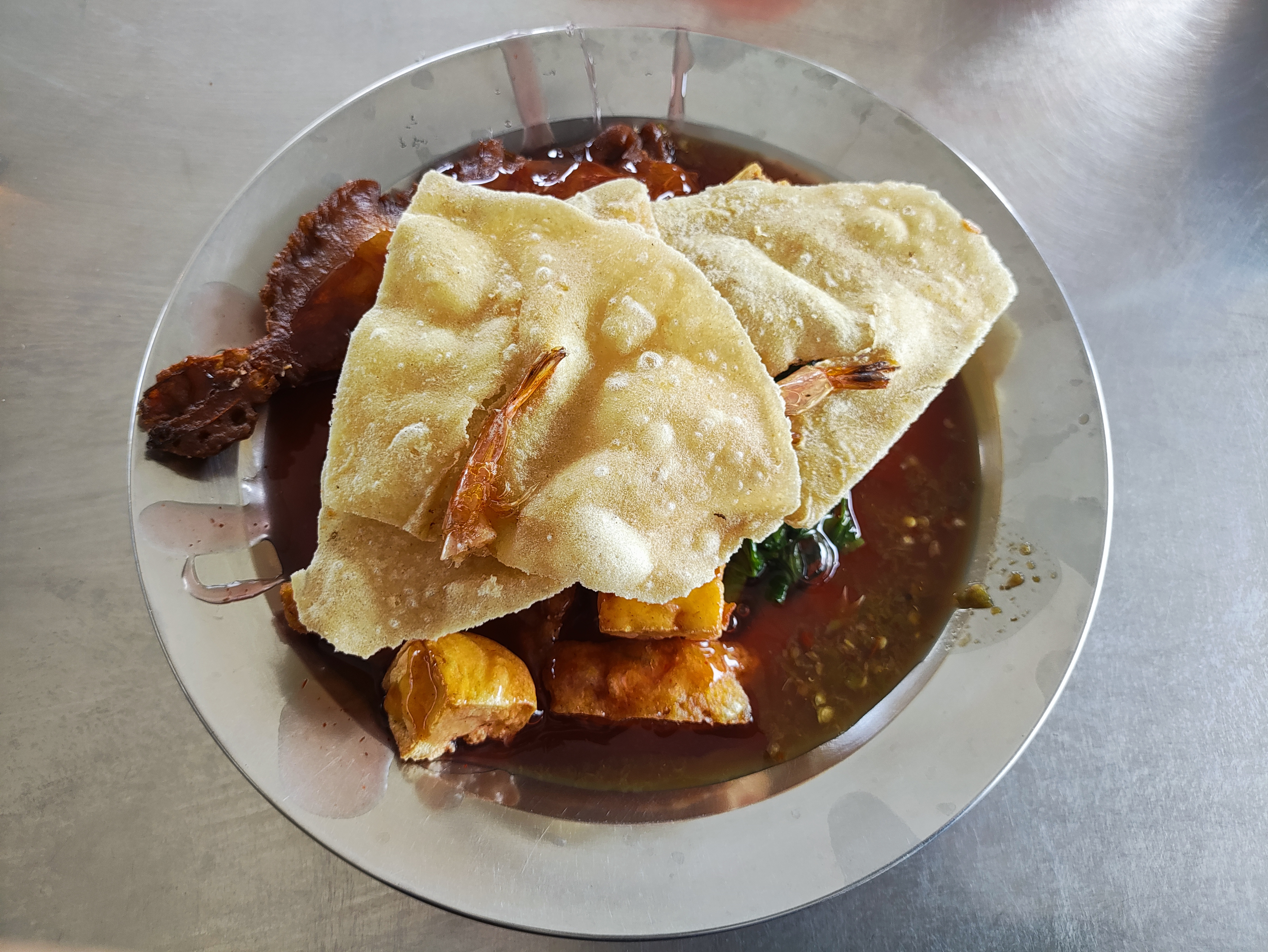
Tau kua heci, a tofu dish with prawn. It is from Binjai, North Sumatra.

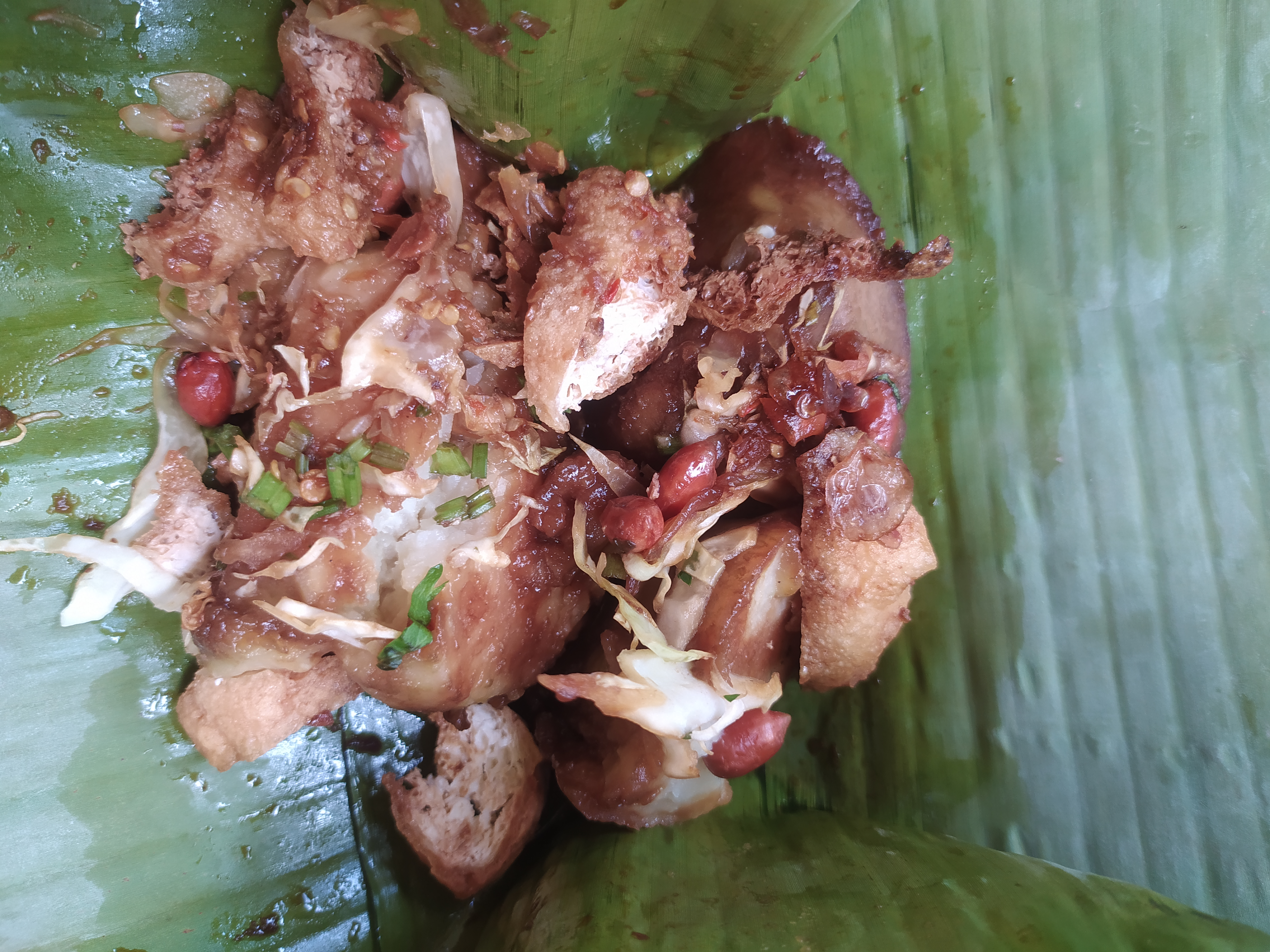
Tepo tahu. fried tofu with tepo (rice cake) and vegetables drizzled with peanut sauce. Originated from central western of East Java.

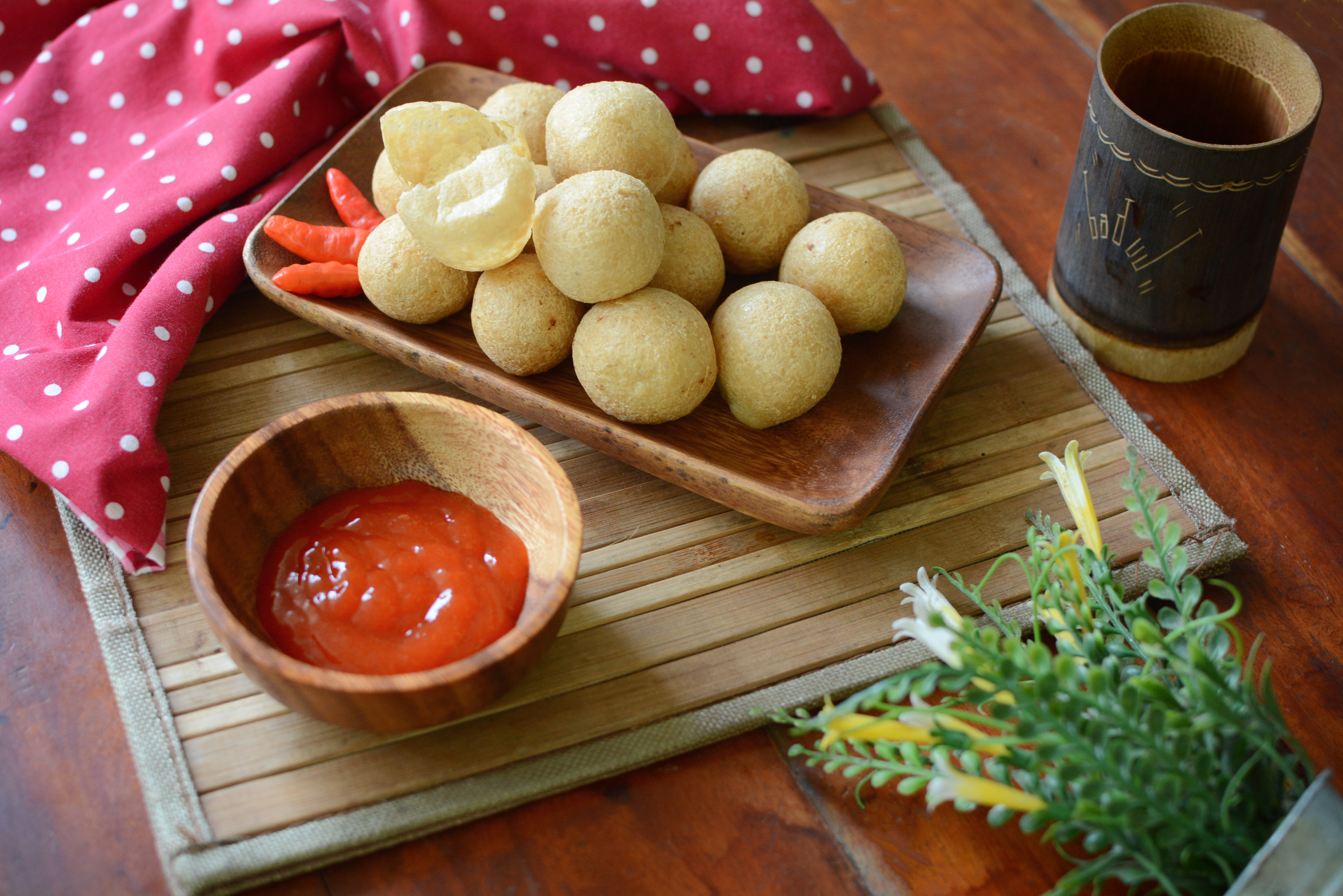
Tahu bulat. (round tofu). It was created in Tasikmalaya, West Java.

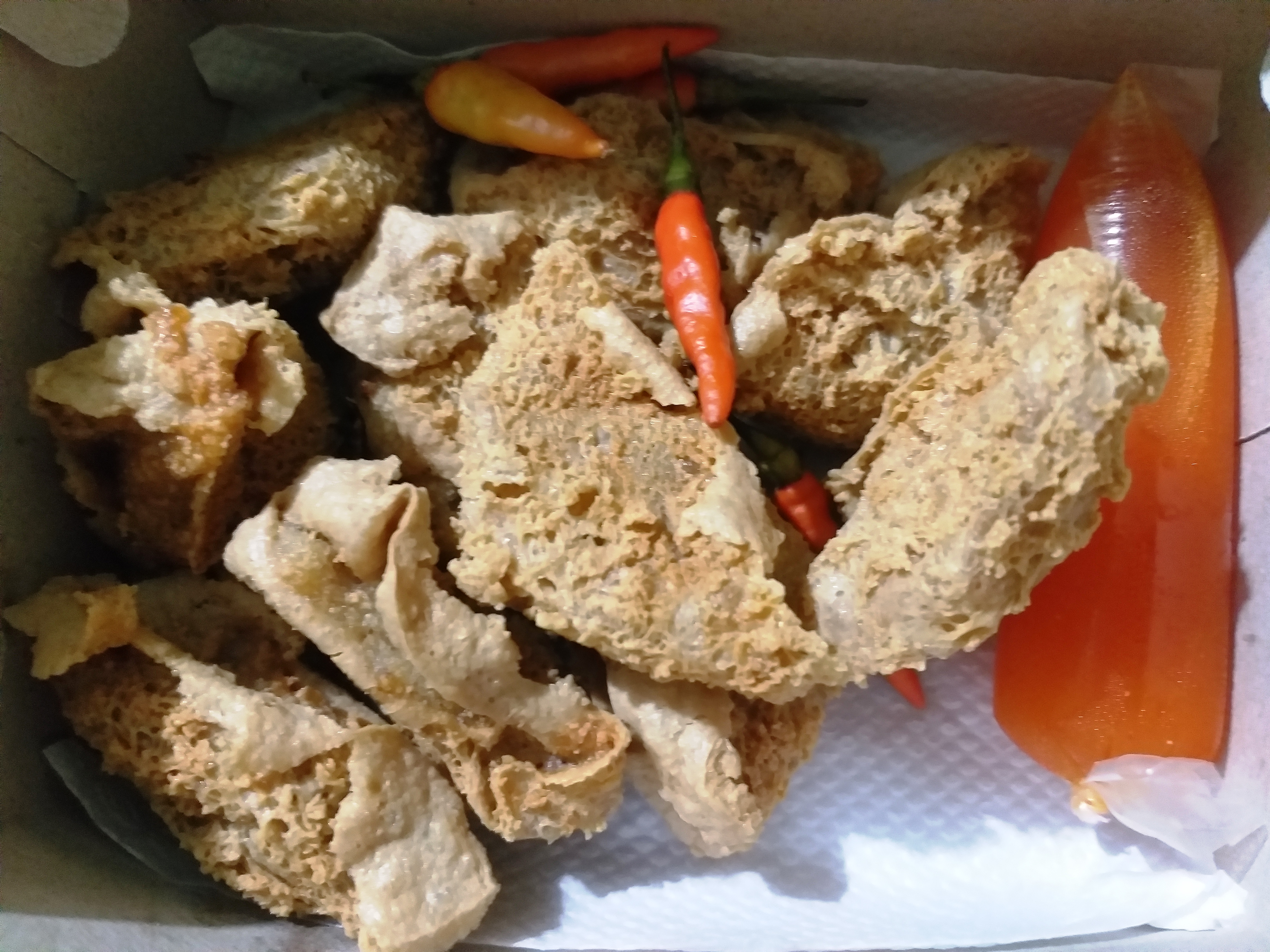
Tahu walik. a fried tofu from Banyuwangi, East Java

==== Philippines ====
In the Philippines, the sweet delicacy tahô is made of fresh tofu (vendors scooped from a wooden bucket with a flat spoon) with brown palm or pandan-flavored sugar syrup and sagó.

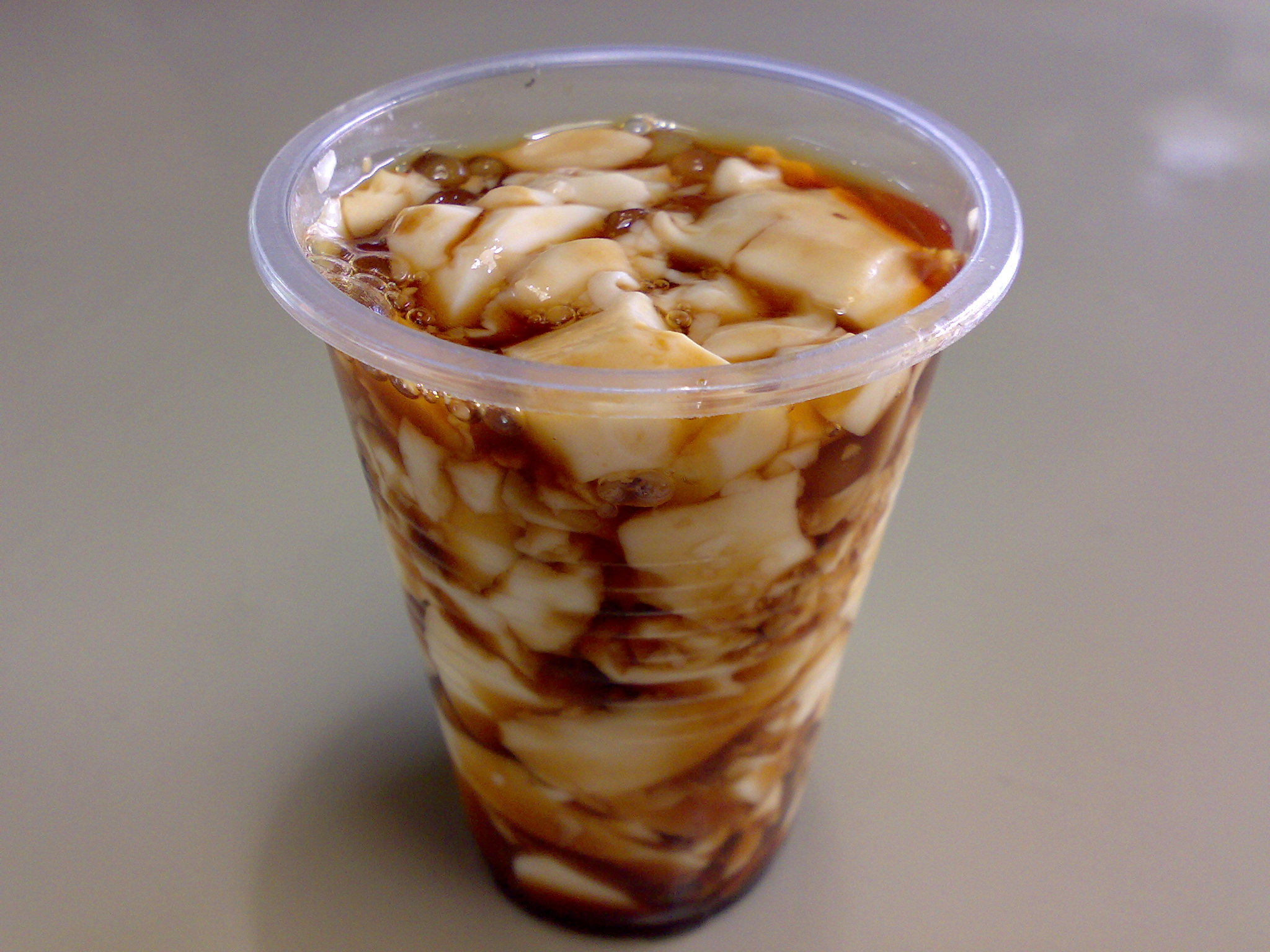
A cup of taho

==== Vietnam ====
In Vietnam, tofu pronounced đậu phụ and đậu hũ is a variety of soft tofu made and carried around in an earthenware jar.

Another popular dish with tofu is bún đậu mắm tôm, which is a dish with rice noodles served with tofu and shrimp paste.

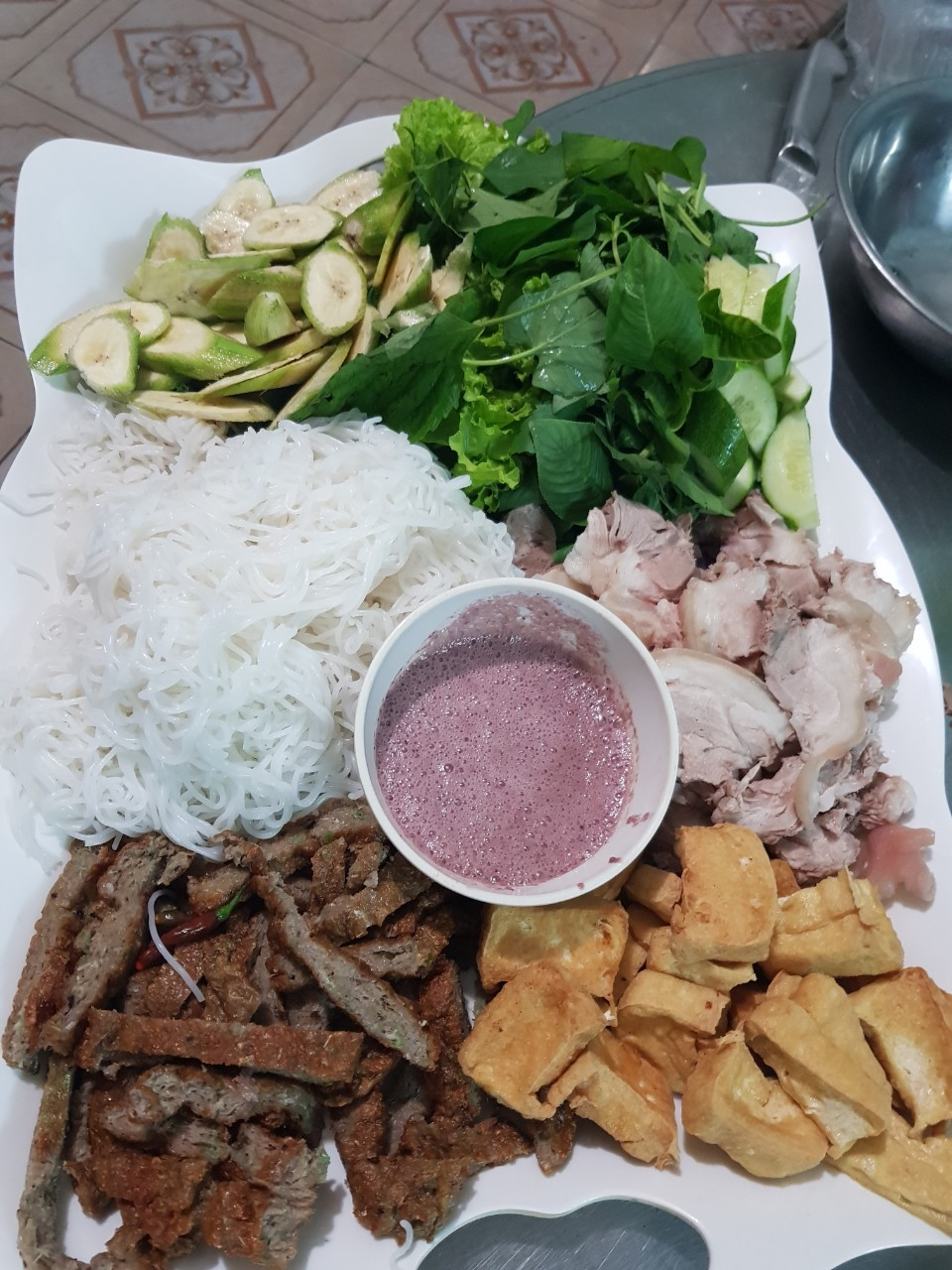
Bún đậu mắm tôm

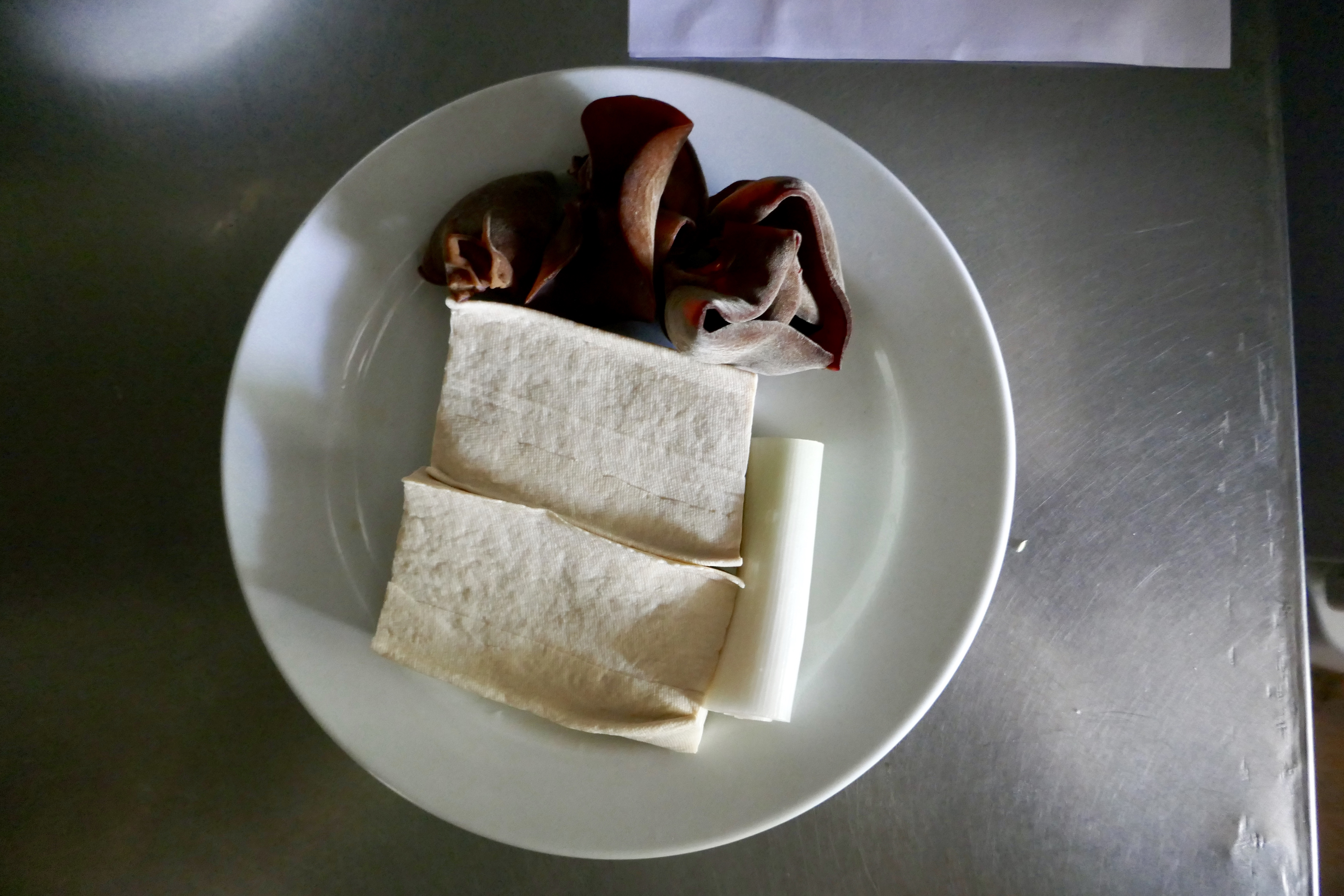
Đậu hũ

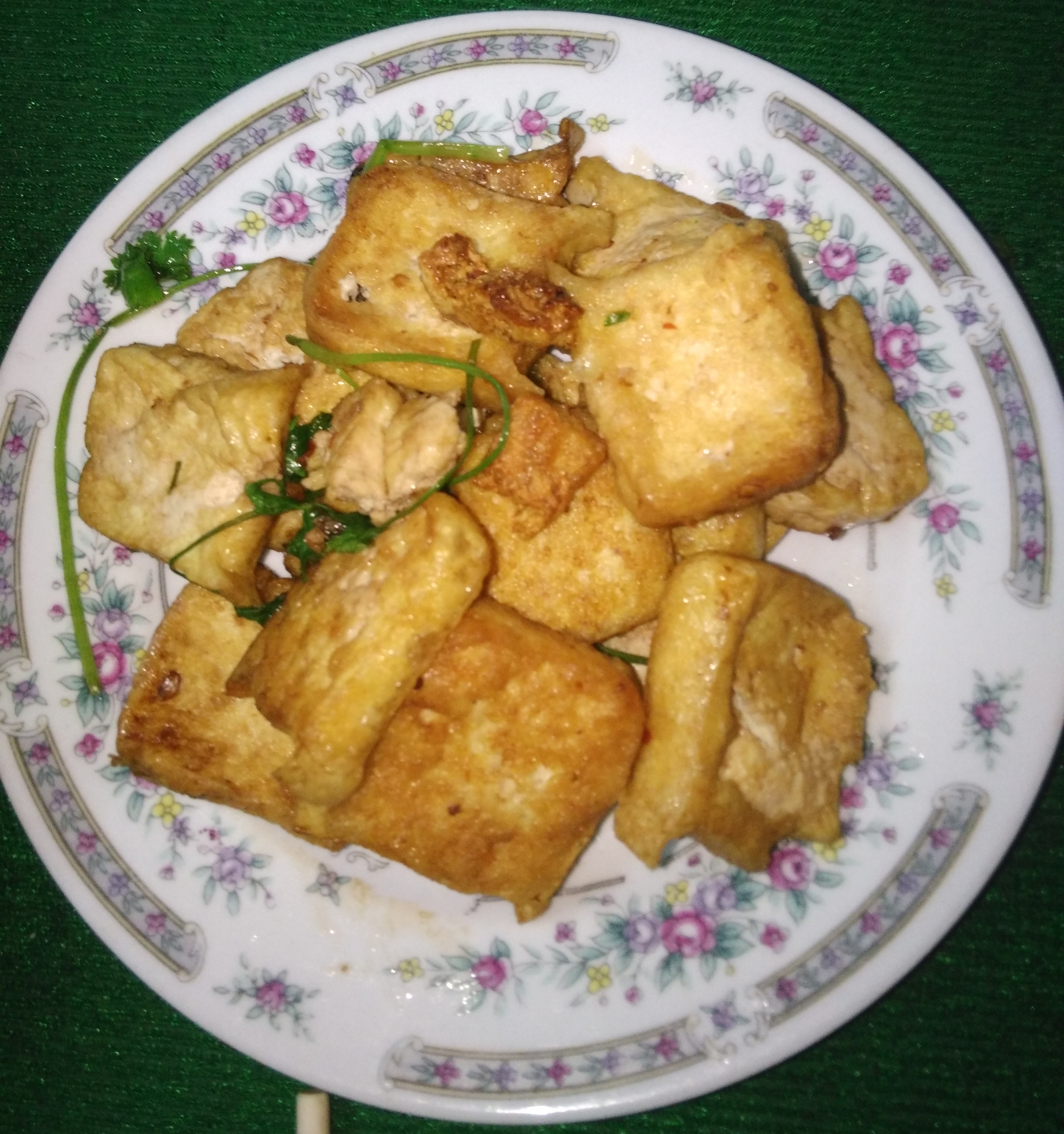
Đậu hũ rán (fried đậu hũ)

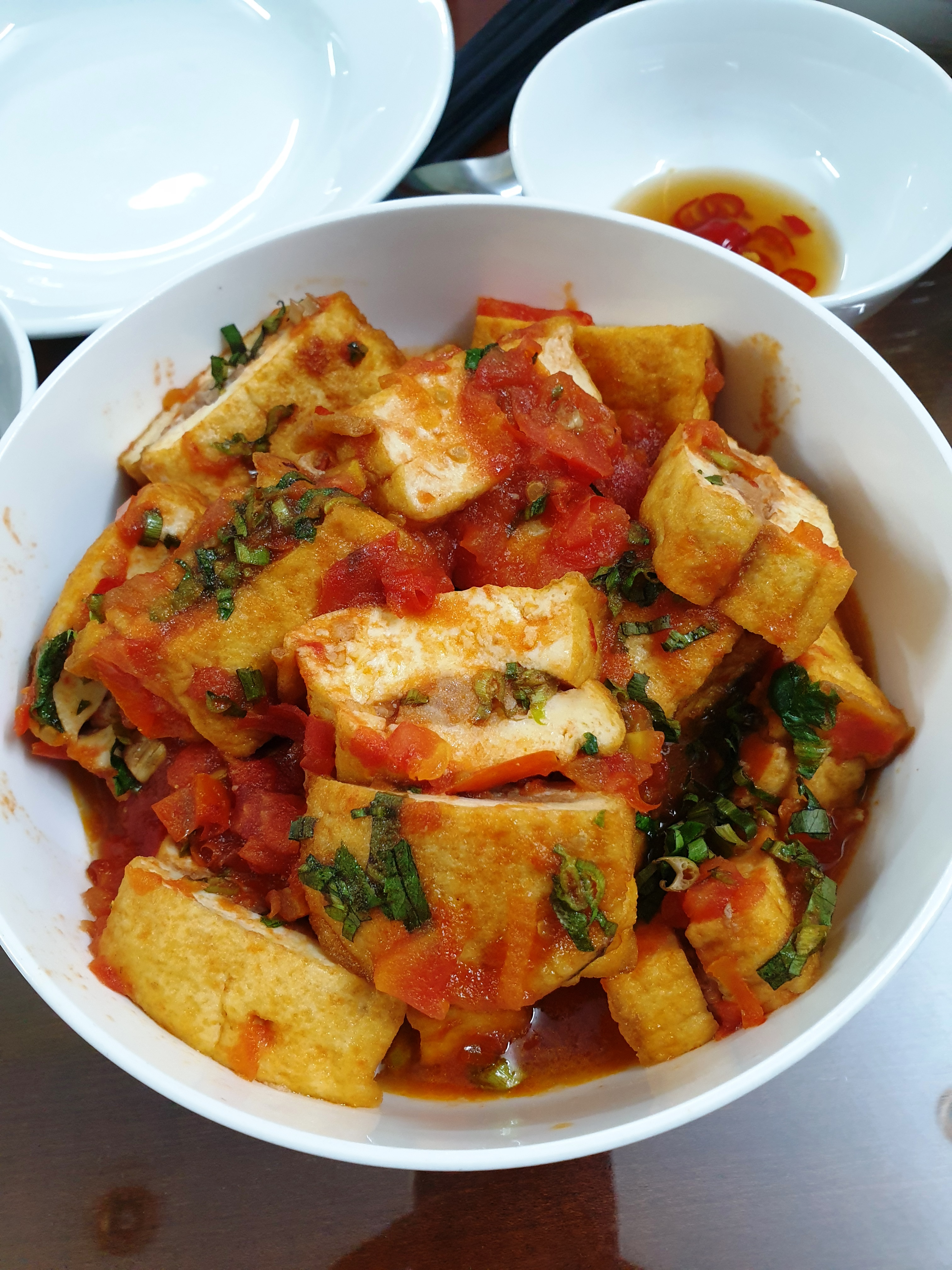
Đậu hũ sốt cà (đậu hũ with tomato sauce)

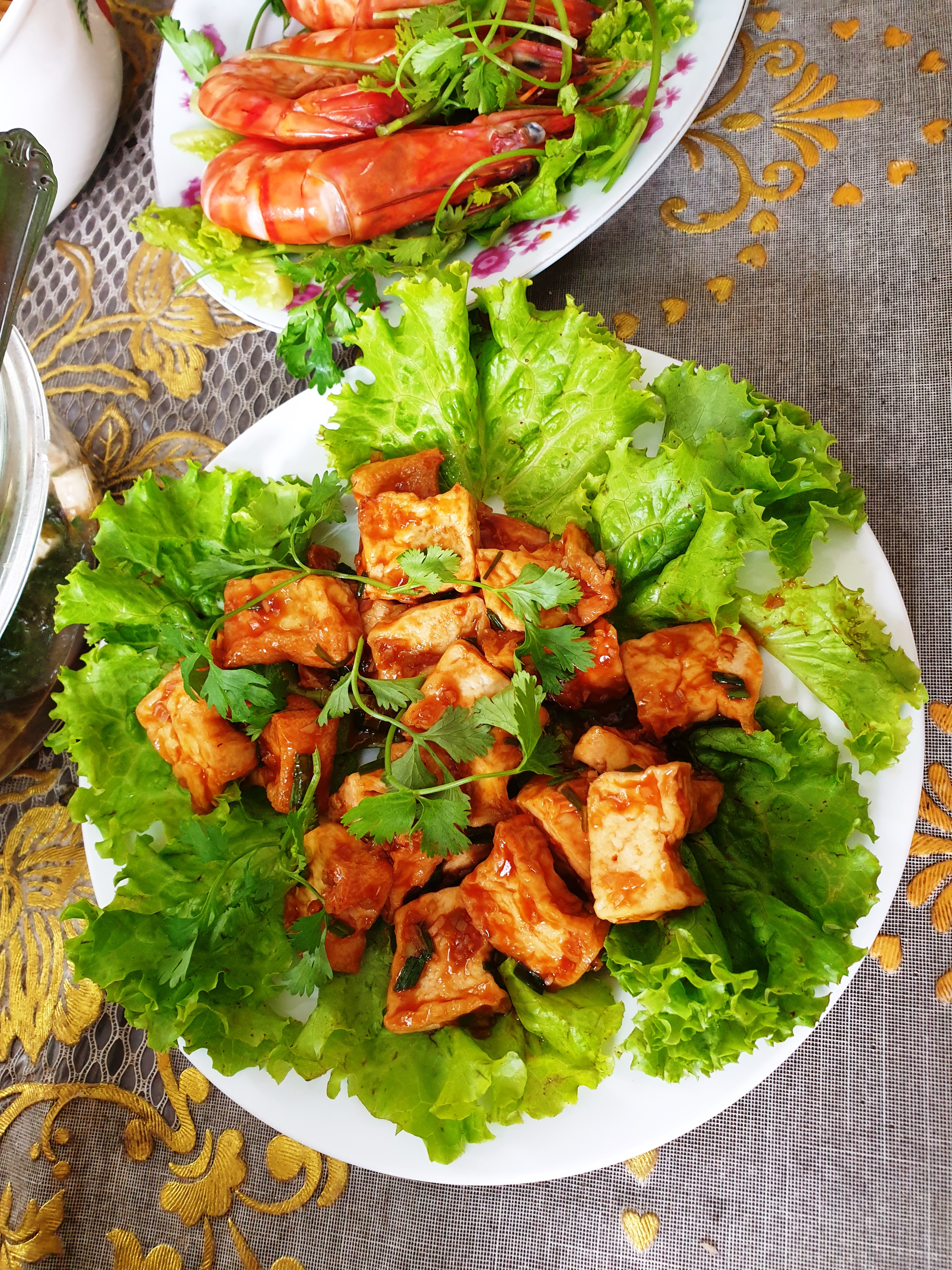
Đậu hũ in the Tất niên offering tray

=== Elsewhere ===
Generally, the firmer styles of tofu are used for kebabs, mock meats, and dishes requiring a consistency that holds together, while the softer styles can be used for desserts, soups, shakes, and sauces. Some people enjoy tofu made and prepared with chocolate and making it into pies and mousse along with other tofu desserts. This came about due to vegans and vegetarians avoiding the usage of items such as milk and eggs.

Firm Western tofu types can be barbecued since they hold together on a barbecue grill. These types are usually marinated overnight as the marinade does not easily penetrate the entire block of tofu. (Techniques to increase the penetration of marinades include stabbing repeatedly with a fork or pressing out the initial water content either by hand or with a tofu press prior to marinating. Before pressing the tofu, it is sometimes frozen and thawed in order of creating a more porous texture, often compared to a sponge. This texture does not only help release the initial water content, but also allows for an altered mouthfeel and more absorbent structure. Typically, the tofu is frozen and thawed once, although some culinary experts recommend executing this technique twice for a stronger effect.) Grated firm Western tofu is sometimes used in conjunction with textured vegetable protein (TVP) as a meat substitute. Softer tofus are sometimes used as a dairy-free or low-calorie filler. Silken tofu may be used to replace cheese in certain dishes, such as lasagna. Tofu has also been fused into other cuisines in the West, for instance in Indian-style curries.

Tofu and soy protein can be industrially processed to match the textures and flavors of cheese, pudding, eggs, bacon, and similar products. Tofu's texture can also be altered by freezing, puréeing, and cooking. In the Americas, Europe, Australia and New Zealand, tofu is frequently associated with vegetarianism and veganism, as it is a source of non-animal protein.

In India, tofu is used as a low-fat replacement for paneer, providing a similar texture.

Awara (also known as wara soya, Nigerian tofu, or Beske), is a food commonly consumed in Northern Nigeria. It's produced by curdling soy milk with a natural agent, then pressing, seasoning, and frying it into cubes. As opposed to an ingredient substitute, the tofu is eaten as the main ingredient, often with vegetables on the side.

== Nutrition ==
Tofu (raw, regular)
Nutritional value per 100 g (3.5 oz)
- Energy: 317 kJ (76 kcal)
- Carbohydrates: 1.9 g
- Fat: 4.8 g
- Protein: 8 g
Vitamins and minerals
Vitamins	Quantity %DV^{†}
Thiamine (B1)	7% 0.08 mg
Riboflavin (B2)	4% 0.05 mg
Niacin (B3)	1% 0.19 mg
Pantothenic acid (B5)	1% 0.07 mg
Vitamin B6	3% 0.05 mg
Folate (B9)	4% 15 μg
Vitamin K	2% 2.4 μg
Minerals	Quantity %DV^{†}
Calcium	27% 350 mg
Copper	21% 0.19 mg
Iron	30% 5.4 mg
Magnesium	7% 30 mg
Manganese	26% 0.6 mg
Phosphorus	8% 97 mg
Potassium	4% 121 mg
Sodium	0% 7 mg
Zinc	7% 0.8 mg
- Other constituents: Quantity
- Water: 85 g
- Link to USDA FoodData Central Entry
- ^{†}Percentages estimated using US recommendations for adults, except for potassium, which is estimated based on expert recommendation from the National Academies.

Raw regular tofu is 85% water, 8% protein, 2% carbohydrates, and 5% fat (table). In a reference amount of 100 g (3.5 oz), tofu supplies 76 calories, and is a rich source (20% or more of the Daily Value) of calcium, copper, iron, and manganese (table).

== Chemistry ==
Tofu is made from soy milk which is a turbid colloid liquid/solution. Tofu structure is related to soy milk components, particularly colloid components such as protein particles and oil globules. Protein particle content increases with the increase of the globulin ratio in the soybeans. Tofu varieties ensue from adding coagulants at various concentrations.

== Proteins ==
The two main components of the soybean important in tofu making are the 11S component, containing glycinin, and the 7S subunit, containing hemagglutinins, lipoxygenases, b-amylase, and β-conglycinin. The major soy protein components, in the two fractions that make up 65–85% of the proteins in soybeans, include glycinin and β-conglycinin. The soybean protein consists of many different subunits, which are sensitive to heat, pH, and ionic strength and become unevenly distributed among soluble and particulate fractions due to hydrophilic and hydrophobic interaction because of the amino acid composition.

== Politics ==
In Western culture, references to tofu have been used as a pejorative shorthand against left wing and vegan ideologies. In 2018, US Republican Ted Cruz criticized Democrats for wanting Texas to become "just like California, right down to tofu and silicon and dyed hair". In 2022, British home secretary Suella Braverman attacked the "Guardian-reading, tofu-eating wokerati" in the British House of Commons, blaming them for obstructing the roads. In April 2025 Markus Söder, the head of the German Christian Social Union, said that Germany could now look forward to more Leberkäse—a kind of meatloaf—instead of "Tofu-mania".

== See also ==
- Buddhist cuisine
- Douhua
- List of soy-based foods
- List of tofu dishes
- Beske
- Los Angeles Tofu Festival
- Oncom
- Seitan
- Tempeh
- Veganism
- Vegetarian cuisine

== Sources ==
- Anderson, J. W.; Johnstone, B.M.; Cook-Newell, M.E. (1995), "Meta-Analysis of the Effects of Soy Protein Intake on Serum Lipids", New England Journal of Medicine, 333 (5): 276–282, doi:10.1056/NEJM199508033330502, PMID 7596371
- Ang, Catharina Y. W.; Liu, KeShun; Huang, Yao-Wen, eds. (1999), Asian Foods: Science & Technology, Lancaster, Pennsylvania: Technomic Publishing Co., archived from the original on 17 January 2006
- Du Bois, Christine M., Chee Beng Tan and Sidney Wilfred Mintz (2008). The World of Soy. Urbana: University of Illinois Press. ISBN 978-0-252-03341-4. Archived from the original on 13 January 2023.
- Guo, Shun-Tang; Ono, Tomotada (2005). "The Role of Composition and Content of Protein Particles in Soymilk on Tofu Curding by Glucono-δ-lactone or Calcium Sulfate". Journal of Food Science. 70 (4): 258–262. doi:10.1111/j.1365-2621.2005.tb07170.x..
- Liu, KeShun (2012). Soybeans: Chemistry, Technology and Utilization. Springer. ISBN 978-1-4615-1763-4. Archived from the original on 13 January 2023.
- Needham, Joseph. Science and Civilisation in China. Cambridge University Press.
- Shurtleff, William; Aoyagi, Akiko (1998), The book of tofu: protein source of the future-- now!, Ten Speed Press, ISBN 978-1-58008-013-2, archived from the original on 13 January 2023.
- Shurtleff, William; Aoyagi, Akiko (2000). Tofu & soymilk production: a craft and technical manual (3rd ed.). Lafayette, California: Soyfoods Center. ISBN 978-1-928914-04-4. Archived from the original on 24 March 2017.
- Shurtleff, William; Aoyagi, Akiko (2004d). "Chapter 36: History of Tofu". History of Soybeans and Soyfoods: 1100 B.C. to the 1980s, Volume IV, The History of Traditional Non-Fermented Soyfoods. Soyinfo Center. Archived from the original on 23 June 2011.
- Shurtleff, William; Aoyagi, Akiko (2004e). "Chapter 44: History of Fermented Tofu (to Nov. 1985)". History of Soybeans and Soyfoods: 1100 B.C. to the 1980s, Volume V, The History of Traditional Fermented Soyfoods. Soyinfo Center. Archived from the original on 11 November 2007.
- Shurtleff, William; Aoyagi, Akiko (2005), Dou fu zhi shu (The book of tofu), Taibei Shi, ISBN 978-986-81319-1-0. (In Chinese.)
- Shurtleff, William; Aoyagi, Akiko (2013), History of Tofu and Tofu Products (965 CE to 2013), Lafayette, California: Soyinfo Center, ISBN 978-1-928914-55-6, archived from the original on 3 September 2013.
- Wilkinson, Endymion (2015). Chinese History: A New Manual (4th ed.). Cambridge, Mass.: Harvard University Asia Center. ISBN 978-0-674-08846-7.
