= Mount Tampomas =

Small andesitic volcano in West Java, Indonesia

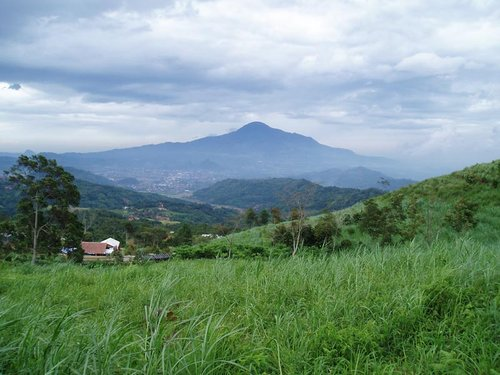

Highest point
- Elevation: 1,684 m (5,525 ft)
- Listing: Ribu
- Coordinates: 6.77°S 107.95°E

Geography
- Location within Java Location within Indonesia
- Location: Java, Indonesia

Geology
- Mountain type: Stratovolcano
- Volcanic arc: Sunda Arc
- Last eruption: Unknown

Mount Tampomas is a small andesitic stratovolcano in West Java, Indonesia. Young lava flows are found on the eastern flank of the volcano.

The mountain was used as a source of construction rocks to build the nearby Mrica Hydroelectric Dam project. Tampomas means "winnows of gold" in Sundanese. The mountain area is locally known as Agro Gusti Kencanawati named after lady spirit resides there. The legend says that a royal couple once had an argument and their spirits lay in the two rock outcrops side by side for eternity. The nearby mountain is where the male spirit is supposed to reside.

== See also ==
- List of volcanoes in Indonesia
- Cimanuk
- Cipunagara River
- Jatigede Dam
- Sumedang
- Sumedang Larang Kingdom
