= List of tofu dishes =

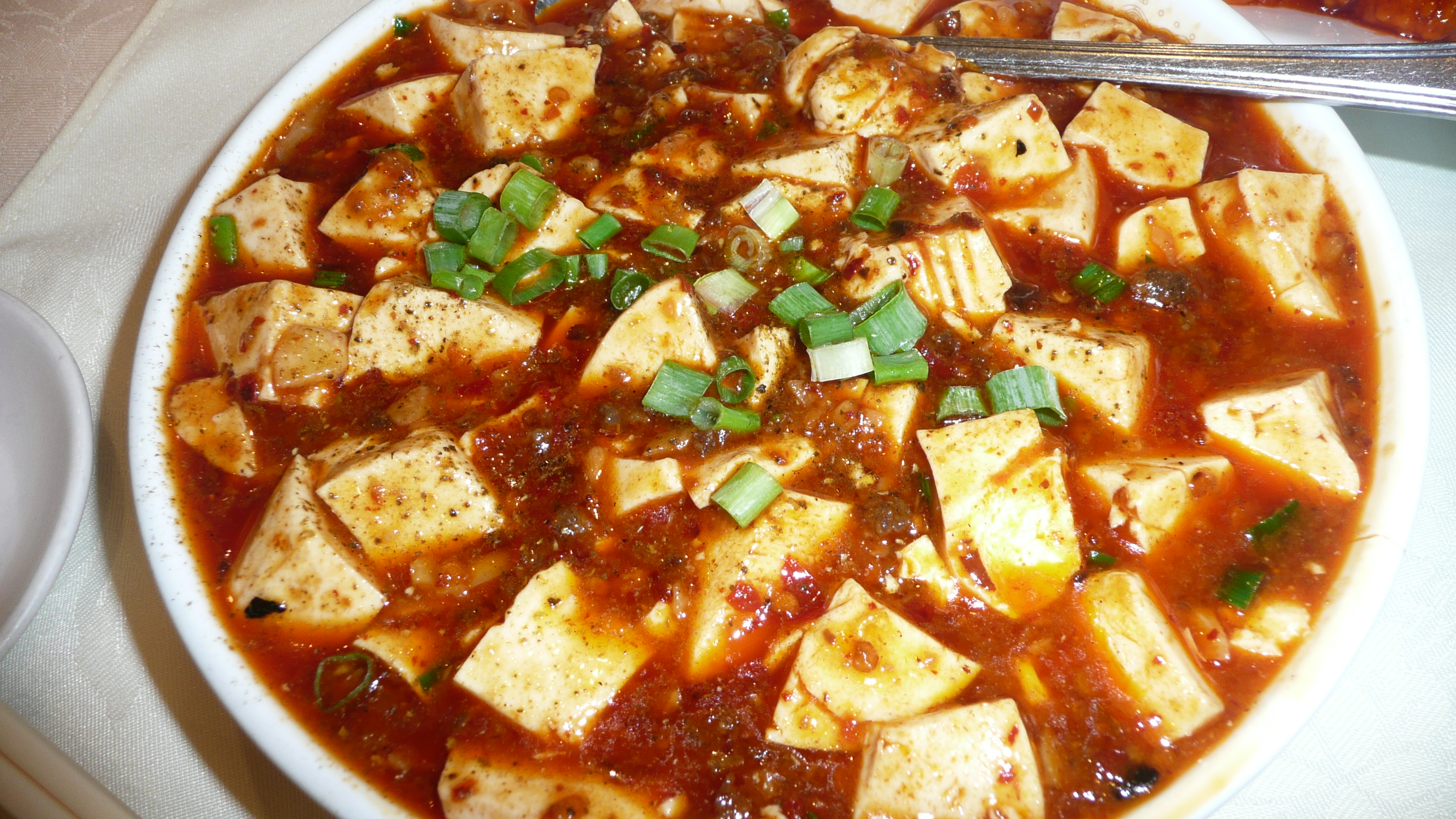
Mapo doufu

Tofu is a component in many East Asian and Southeast Asian cuisines. Also called bean curd, tofu is made by coagulating soy milk and then pressing the resulting curds into soft white blocks.

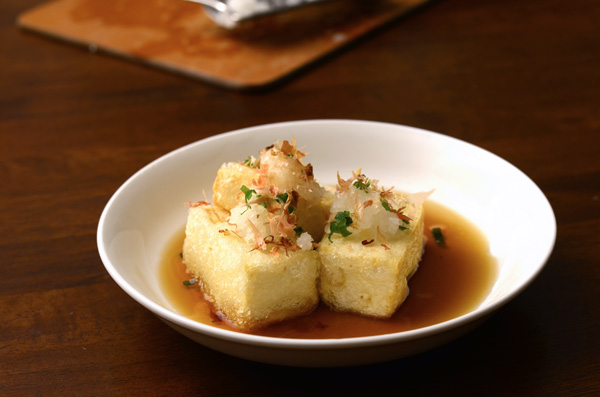
Japanese agedashi dōfu

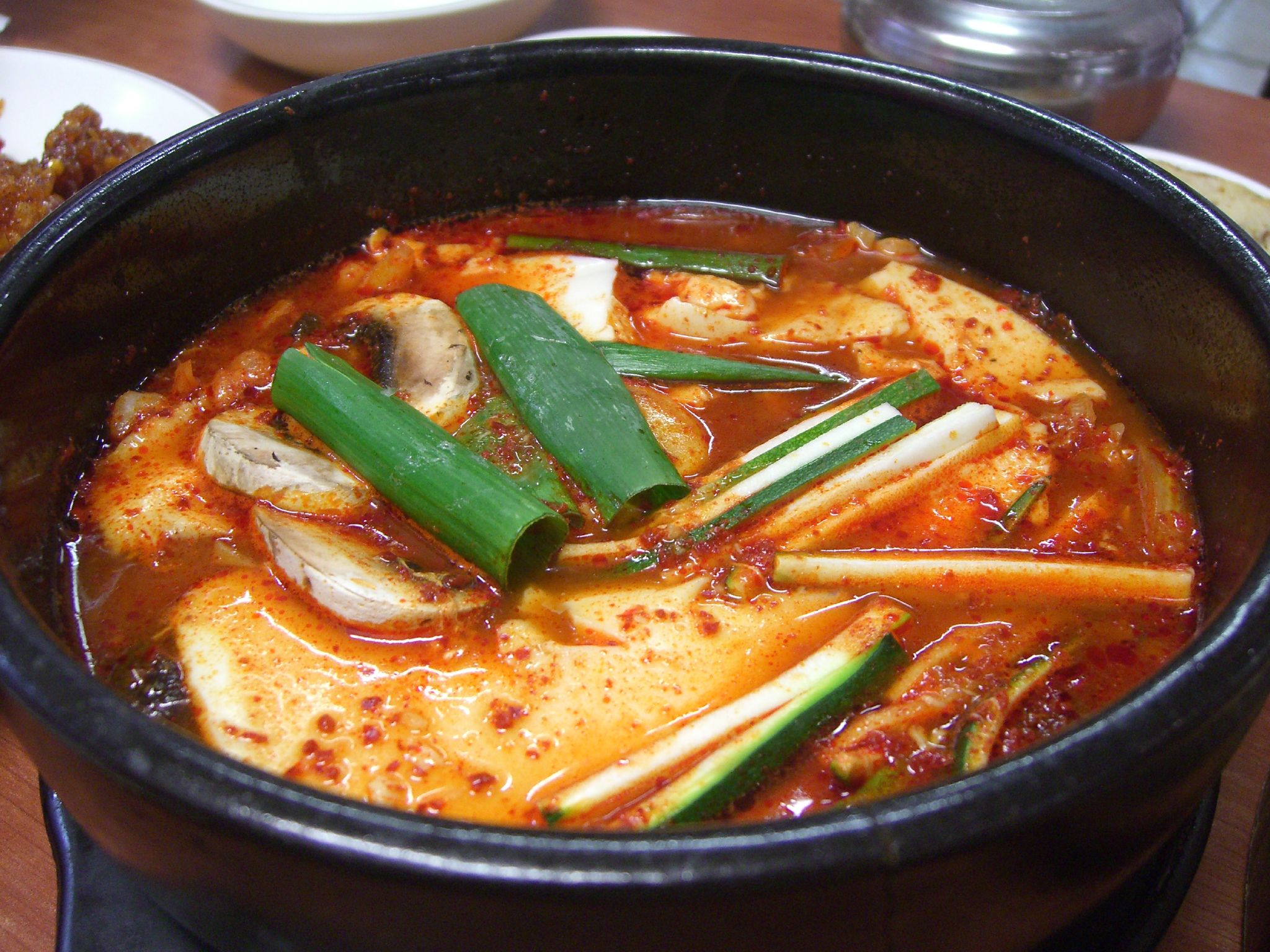
Korean sundubu jjigae

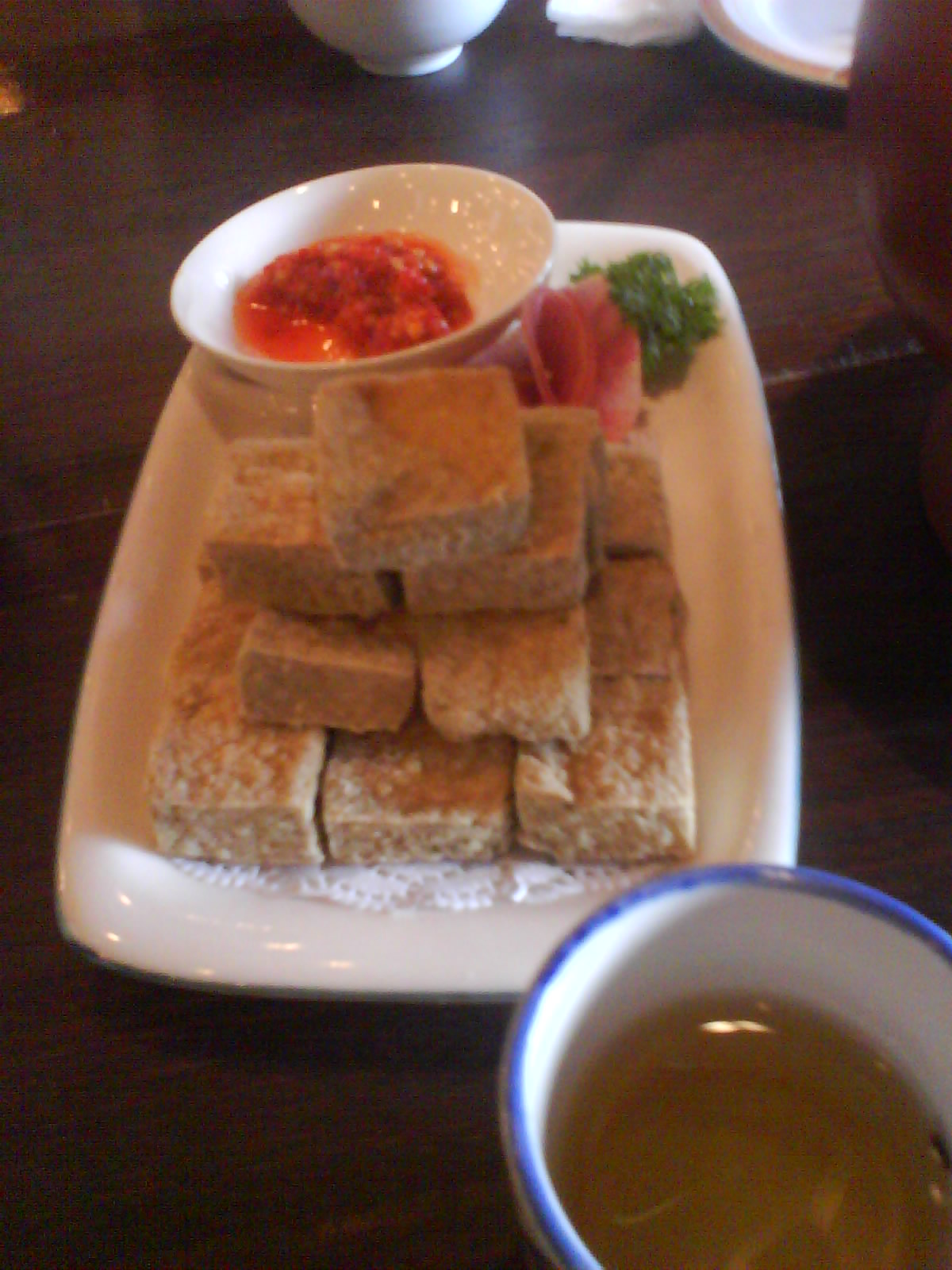
Stinky tofu, a form of fermented tofu that has a strong odor

- Agedashi dōfu – Japanese tofu dish
- Bai ye – Chinese and Japanese food made from soybeans
- Bún ốc – Vietnamese soup
- Chanpurū – Okinawan stir fry dish
- Doenjang jjigae – Korean dish of soybean paste stew
- Douhua – Chinese dessert made with tender tofu
- Dubu gui – grilled tofu rectangles
- Dubu jjigae – Korean tofu stew
- Dubu kimchi – Korean tofu and stir-fried kimchi dish
- Ganmodoki – Tofu fritter made with vegetables
- Hiyayakko – Japanese tofu dish
- Huai'an Pingqiao tofu – Chinese dish
- Inarizushi – Japanese dish of vinegared rice and seafood
- Kupat tahu – Southeast Asian dish made of rice in the shape of a diamond
- Mapo doufu – Sichuan cuisine dish
- Pidan doufu – Chinese cold tofu dish
- Mun tahu – Indonesian tofu soup dish
- Sapo tahu – Indonesian tofu soup dish
- Stinky tofu – Chinese fermented tofu with a strong odor
- Sundubu jjigae – Korean traditional soft tofu stew
- Taho – Philippine snack food
- Tahu aci
- Tahu campur – Indonesian tofu dish from East Java
- Tahu gejrot – Indonesian fried tofu
- Tahu sumedang – Indonesian fried tofu
- Tahu gimbal
- Tahu goreng – Southeast Asian fried tofu dish
- Tahu petis
- Tāu-kuann-tshiám – Traditional snack from Yilan, Taiwan
- Tofu skin roll – Chinese wrap dish
- Tokwa't baboy – Filipino dish
- Yong tau foo – Tofu filled with ground meat or fish
- Fermented bean curd – Chinese condiment
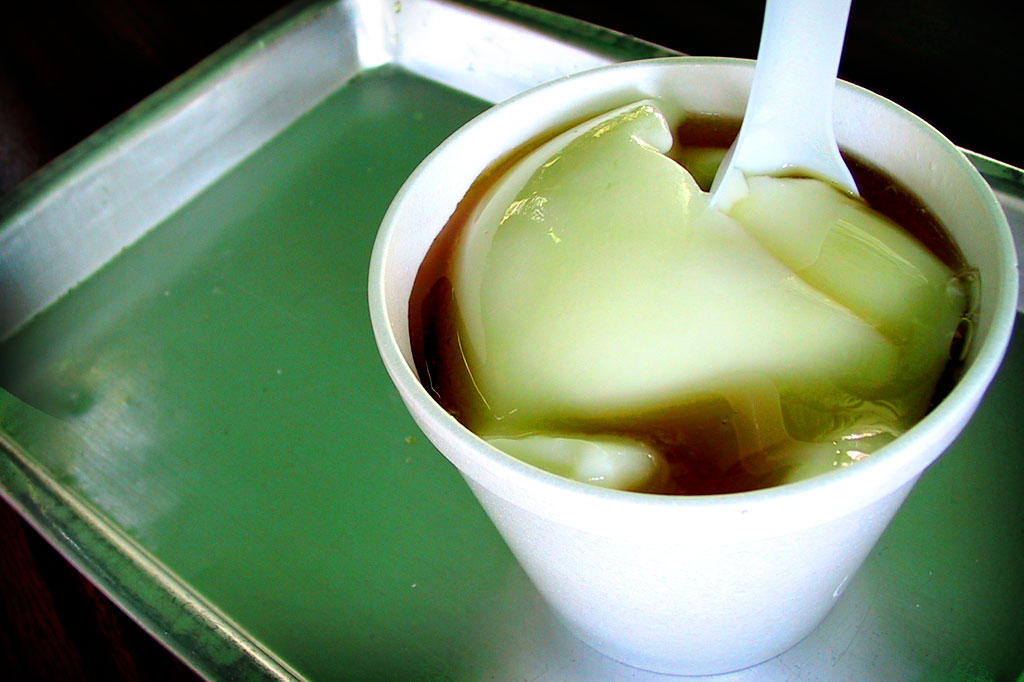
Douhua

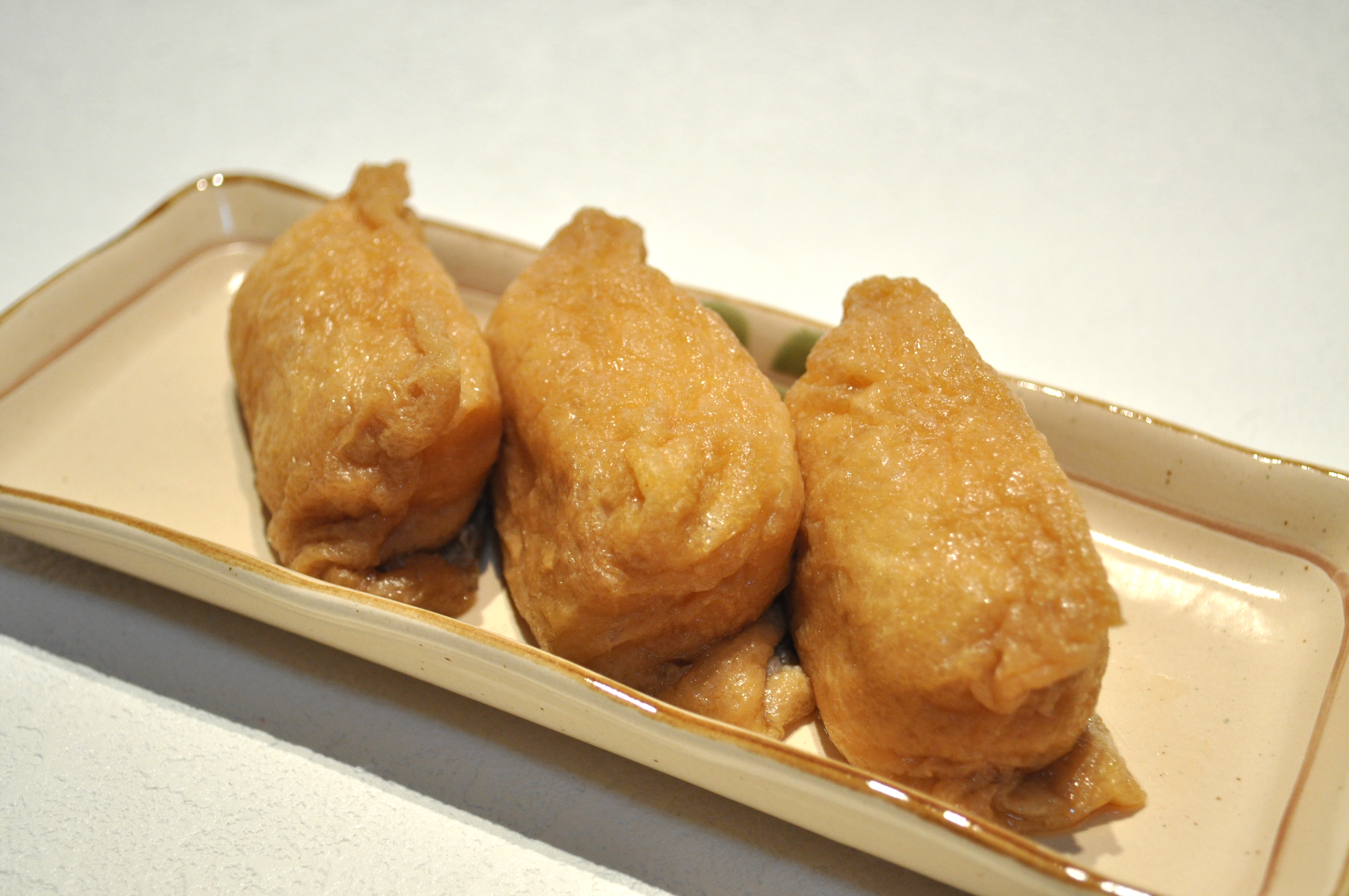
Inarizushi

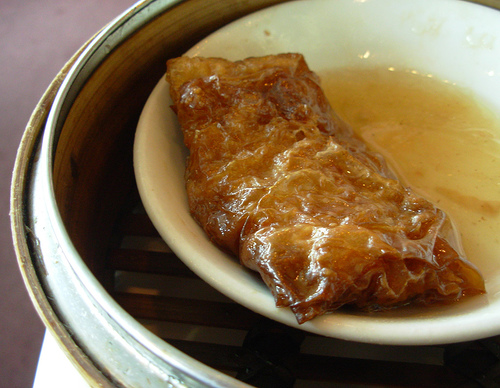
A steamed tofu skin roll

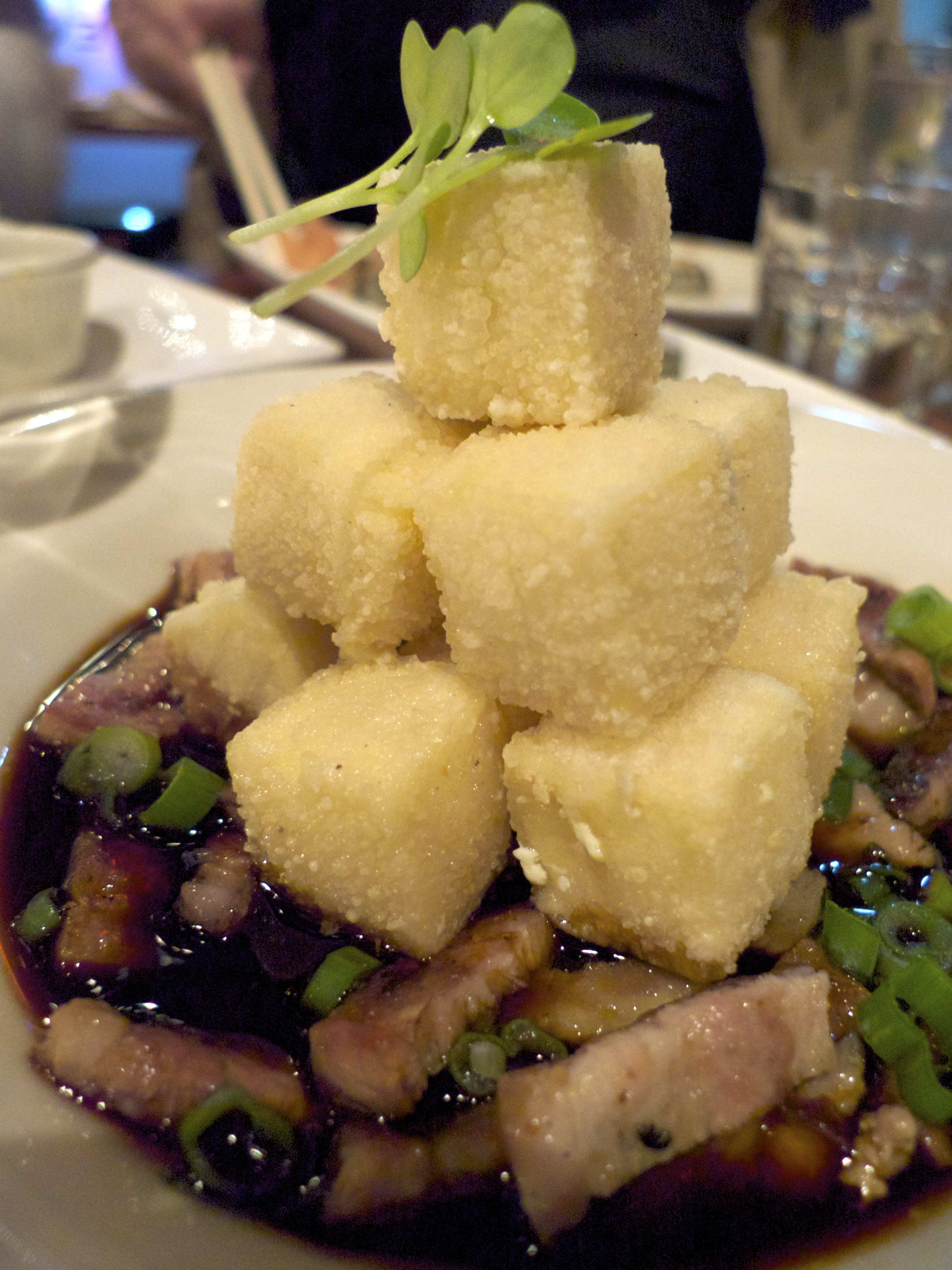
Tokwa't baboy, with crusted, deep-fried soft tofu atop

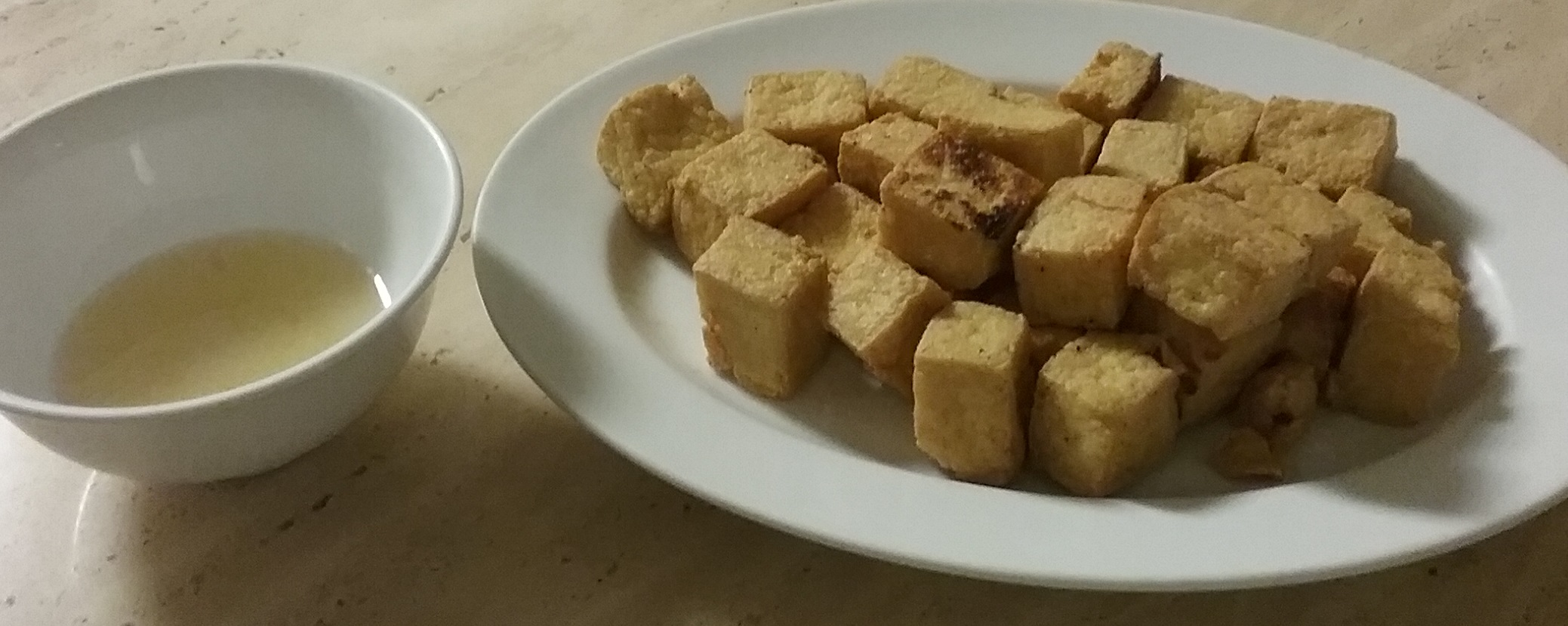
Fried tofu (炸豆腐)

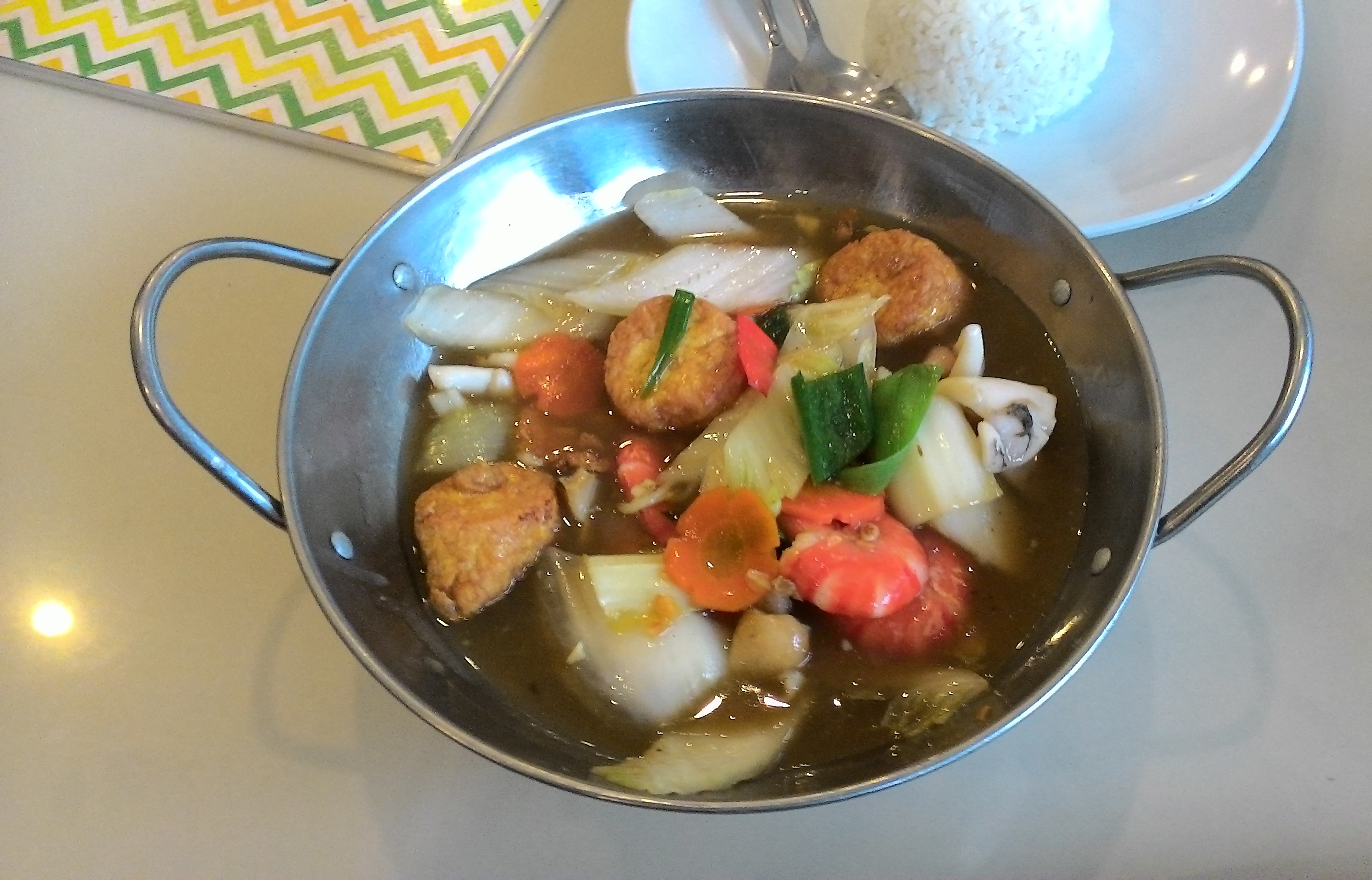
Sapo tahu with seafood

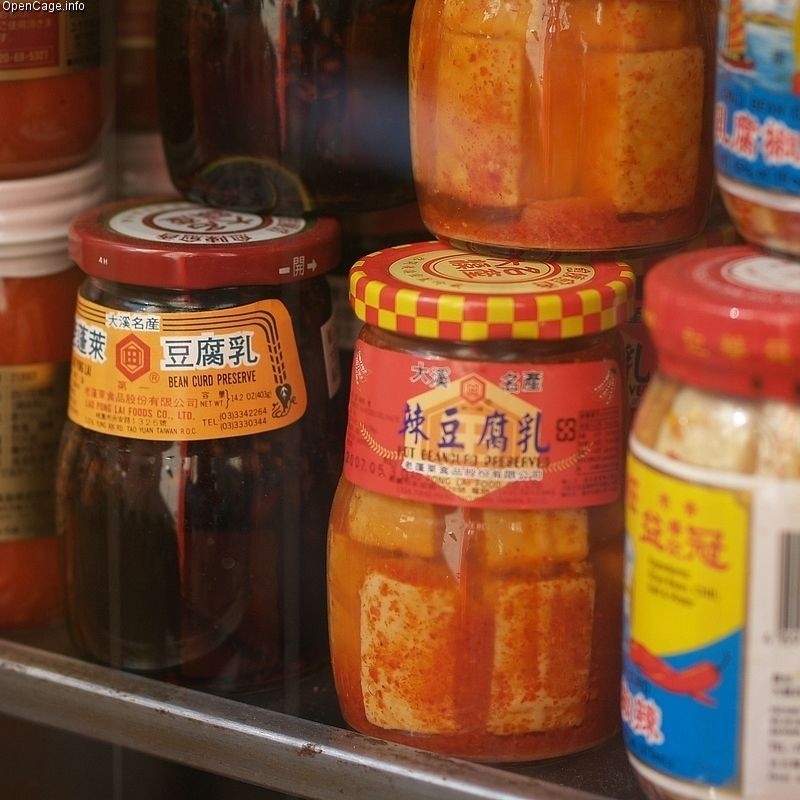
Doufulu, type of fermented and pickled tofu

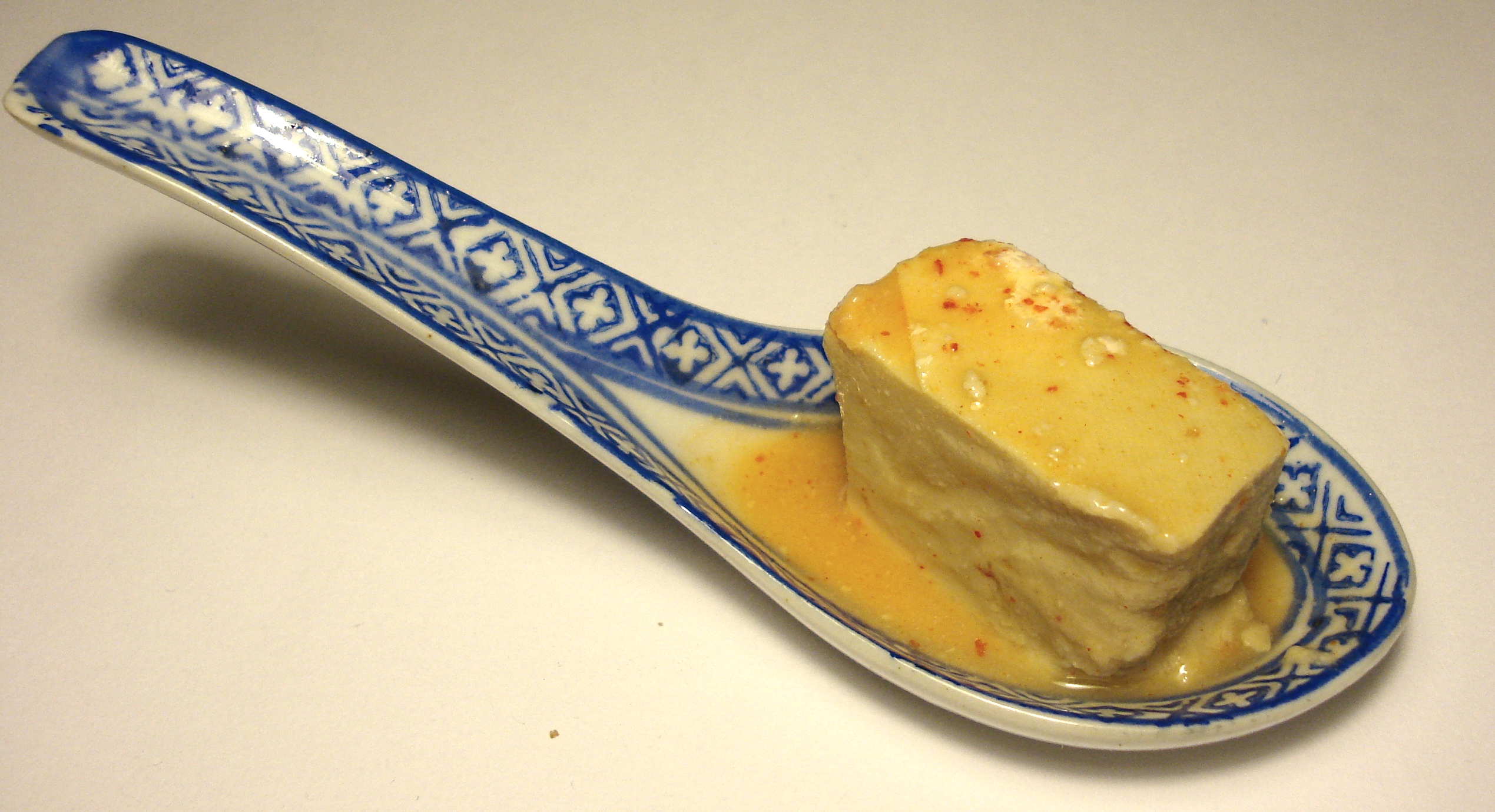
Fermented bean curd is a form of processed, preserved tofu used in East Asian cuisine as a condiment made from soybeans.

== See also ==
- Aburaage
- Burmese tofu
- Dubu
- List of soy-based foods
- Soy pulp
- Soybean
- Tofu skin

== Bibliography ==
- Du Bois, Christine M.; Tan, Chee-Beng. Mintz, Sidney Wilfred (2008), The World of Soy, University of Illinois Press, ISBN 0-252-03341-8
- Knopper, Melissa. (Jan 2002), The joy of soy, The Rotarian, Vol. 180, No. 1, p. 16, ISSN 0035-838X
