= Jatigede Dam =

- Rendition of the future dam, downstream side on the left

- Location within Indonesia
- Official name: Bendungan Jatigede
- Country: Indonesia
- Location: Sumedang, West Java
- Coordinates: 6°51′23″S 108°05′41″E
- Status: Operational
- Construction began: 2008
- Opening date: 2024

Dam and spillways
- Type of dam: Embankment, rock-fill
- Impounds: Cimanuk River
- Height: 110 m (361 ft)
- Length: 1,715 m (5,627 ft)
- Elevation at crest: 265 m (869 ft)
- Width (crest): 110 m (361 ft)
- Dam volume: 6,700,000 m^{3} (8,763,269 cu yd)
- Spillway type: Chute
- Spillway capacity: 4,468 m^{3}/s (157,786 cu ft/s)

Reservoir
- Total capacity: 980,000,000 m^{3} (794,499 acre⋅ft)
- Active capacity: 877,000,000 m^{3} (710,995 acre⋅ft)
- Catchment area: 1,462 km^{2} (564 mi^{2})
- Surface area: 41.22 km^{2} (16 mi^{2})
- Normal elevation: 260 m (853 ft)

Power Station
- Operator: Perusahaan Listrik Negara
- Commission date: 2019 (est.)
- Hydraulic head: 170 m (558 ft) (design)
- Turbines: 2 x 55 MW Francis-type
- Installed capacity: 110 MW

The Jatigede Dam is an embankment dam on the Cimanuk River in Sumedang Regency, West Java, Indonesia. It is located 19 km (12 mi) east of the town of Sumedang. Construction on the dam began in 2008 and it was handed over in 2024. The primary purpose of the dam is irrigation but it will also provide for flood control, water supply and hydroelectric power generation. Water in the reservoir will be used to help irrigate 90,000 ha (222,395 acres) of farmland and the power station is expected to have a 110 MW capacity. The project was controversial, primarily due to the relocation of people in the reservoir zone.

The Jatigede Dam has an installed capacity of 110 megawatts and is equipped with two 55 MW Francis turbine-generator units, a designed diversion flow of 73 cubic meters per second, and an average annual power generation of about 450 million kilowatt-hours. The reservoir has a total capacity of 980 million cubic meters (259 billion gallons) and covers an area of more than 41 square kilometres (16 square miles). The dam is fed by a catchment area of 1,462 km^{2} (564 miles^{2}).

The dam will meet the electricity needs of approximately 500,000 households and will help ensure a secure power supply to the Java grid, increasing the proportion of clean and renewable energy, promoting economic development, and improving livelihoods in Indonesia.

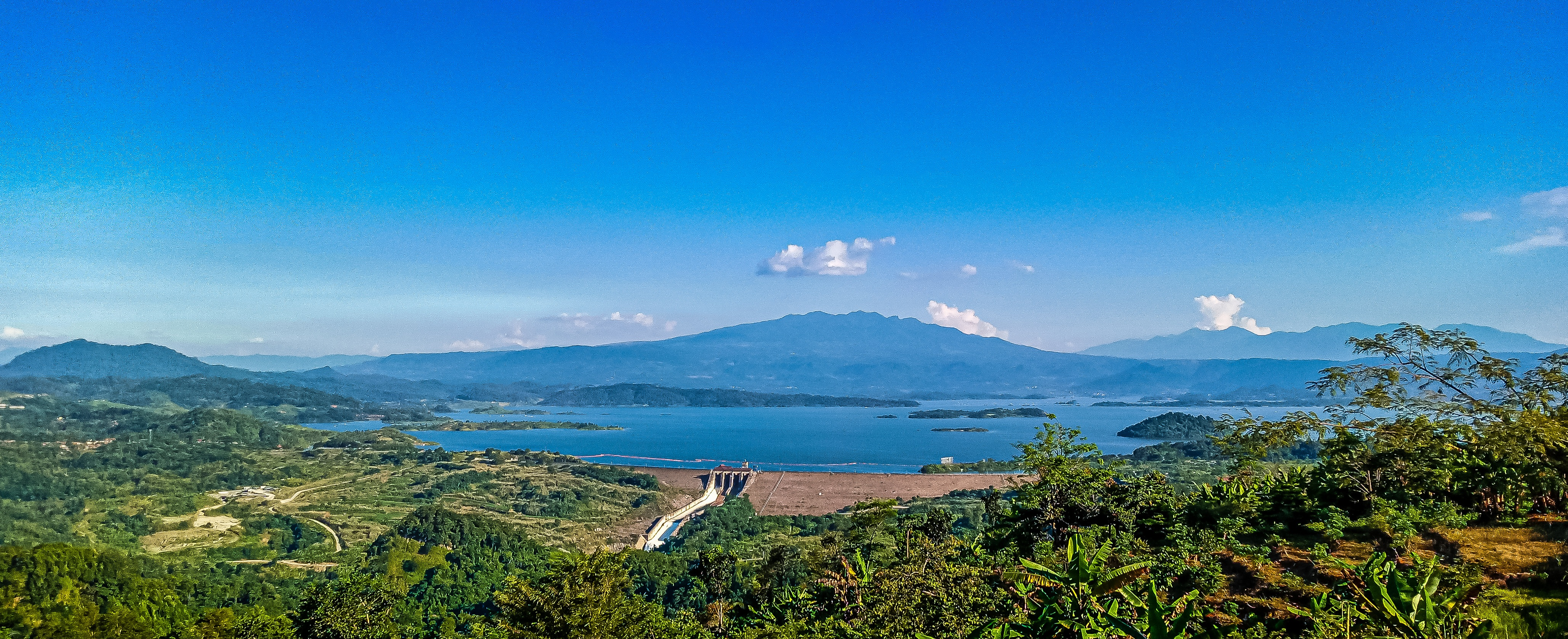

== Background ==
The dam was first proposed in 1963 after a study of the Cimanuk was carried out by Coyne et Bellier. Further planning and designs commenced thereafter. An environmental impact assessment was completed in 1986 and land acquisition study in 2003. After decades of planning and protests, the Indonesian Government announced firm plans to proceed with the dam in 2004.

The project has been surrounded with controversy over the years, particularly as its reservoir would flood 4,896 ha (12,098 acres) of land. This includes five districts and 30 villages which include approximately 70,000 people to be relocated. Affected residents claim that compensation for their land is too low and that the government intimidated them to accept offers in the 1980s. In addition, a 2011 study by Indonesia's Ministry of Public Works estimated that the reservoir would become ineffective in 50 years due to high sedimentation of the river. As a result, conservation activities in the watershed area of Cimanuk River would be undertaken by Ministry of Public Works, Ministry of Forestry, West Java Provincial Government and the relevant regency governments. Furthermore a cekdam (levee to prevent river from widening) in upper area of the Reservoir upper area of the Reservoir will be made. Thus, sedimentation can be lifted and will extend the life of the reservoir.

Despite the controversy, the government stated in 2004 that an agreement had been reached. The contract to build the dam and power plant was awarded to China's Sinohydro Corporation in May 2007. Construction on the dam's diversion tunnel began in October 2008 and was completed in August 2011. The government announced in late 2011 that that dam was 60% complete. In July 2011, it was announced that Perusahaan Listrik Negara would oversee the construction and operation of the 110 MW power plant. The dam and power plant is expected to cost US$224 million. In May 2013 the government announced that the total cost would be around $400 million and that the dam was 70% complete. Currently, the dam was expected to start impounding its reservoir in early 2015. This major step in construction has been repeatedly delayed due to resident relocations.

In December 2014, a contract was signed with Sinohydro to construct the power station. It should be operational in 2019. On 31 August 2015, the dam began to impound its reservoir, 30 days behind the most recent schedule.

== Design ==
The Jatigede Dam is a 110 m (361 ft) high and 1,715 m (5,627 ft) long rock-fill embankment dam. Its crest is 12 m (39 ft) wide and the body will contain 6,700,000 m^{3} (8,763,269 cu yd) of fill. The dam's spillway is a chute-type on the center of the downstream face. It is controlled by four radial gates and have a discharge capacity of 4,468 m^{3}/s (157,786 cu ft/s). The irrigation intake is located below the spillway. The dam withholds a reservoir with a 980,000,000 m^{3} (794,499 acre⋅ft) storage capacity of which 877,000,000 m^{3} (710,995 acre⋅ft) is active (or 'usable') for water supply and power generation. The reservoir's catchment area encompasses 1,462 km^{2} (564 mi^{2}) while the man-made lake has a surface area of 41.22 km^{2} (16 mi^{2}). The dam's crest elevation is 265 m (869 ft) and the normal reservoir elevation 260 m (853 ft). The intake for the power plant is on the right abutment and sends water into a 3,050 m (10,007 ft) long head-race tunnel before reaching the power plant downstream. The power plant contains two 55 MW Francis turbine-generators (total capacity 110 MW) with a design hydraulic head of 170 m (558 ft).

== See also ==
- List of power stations in Indonesia
