= Cicarimanah =

Village in West Java, Indonesia

Coordinates: 6°49′S 108°03′E

Cicarimanah (Indonesian pronunciation: [t͡ʃit͡ʃariˈmanah]) is a village in Situraja District, Sumedang Regency, West Java Province, Indonesia. The village is located at an altitude of 400 meters above sea level in the region ± 850.35 hectares, and is located west of Pamulihan village, east of Karedok village, south of Cilopang village, and north of Bugel village. Cicarimanah is the largest village in Siturja District with an area of 8.50 square kilometers.

== Administration ==
Administratively, Cicarimanah is one of 15 villages in the District of Situraja of Sumedang Regency, which is located 6 km northeast of the capital of Situraja District. In 2024, there are a total of 4 Rukun Warga (RW) and 13 Rukun Tetangga (RT) in Cicarimanah.

== Climate and geography ==
The mean temperature in Cicarimanah village is 30 °C, and, similar to many villages in Indonesia, experiences a dry and rainy season. The terrain is generally hilly.

== History ==
Cicarimanah was formed around 1982, originally administered as part of Bugel village in Tomo District. The village was first led by a society figure and village native named Omo Rumaja, who served two terms from 1984 to 2002. After these office holders resigned, the village was led by Yayat Ruhiyat, also a village native, who also served two terms from 2002 to 2013. He was succeeded by Ruhatma, who served when Cicarimanah became part of the Situraja District on 1 January 2014.

Village leadership is detailed in the table below:

No	Name	Tenure of Office	Address
1	Omo Rumaja	1984–2002	Cicarimanah
2	Yayat Ruhiyat	2002–2013	Cicarimanah
3	Ruhatma	2013–present	Cicarimanah
