= Rancakalong =

- District (kecamatan)
- Location in Java and Indonesia Rancakalong (Indonesia)
- Coordinates: 6.8334°S 107.84°E
- Country: Indonesia
- Province: West Java
- Regency: Sumedang Regency

Area
  - Total: 55.06 km^{2} (21.26 sq mi)
- Elevation: 468 m (1,535 ft)

Population (mid 2024 estimate)
  - Total: 44,535
  - Density: 808.8/km^{2} (2,095/sq mi)
- Time zone: UTC+7 (IWT)
- Postal code: 45361
- Area code: (+62) 261
- Villages: 10
- Website: Official website

Rancakalong is an administrative district (kecamatan) in Sumedang Regency, part of the province of West Java in Indonesia. It is located north of the provincial route connecting Bandung and Cirebon, with Bandung Metropolitan Area to the southwest, and the town of Sumedang to the east. The district covers a land area of 55.06 km^{2}, and had a population of 44,535 as at mid 2024. The administrative centre is at Nagarawangi.

== Administrative divisions ==
Rancakalong District (Kecamatan Rancakalong) is composed of ten rural villages (desa), listed below with their areas and their populations as at the mid 2024 official estimates. All share the post code of 45361.

Kode Wilayah	Name	Area in km^{2}	Pop'n Estimate mid 2024
32.11.16.2008	Sukasirnarasa	4.74	4,455
32.11.16.2010	Pasirbaru	4.01	5,579
32.11.16.2007	Rancakalong (village)	4.89	4,796
32.11.16.2006	Pamekaran	4.10	3,502
32.11.16.2005	Sukamaju	4.46	4,764
32.11.16.2004	Sukahayu	4.01	4,306
32.11.16.2001	Nagarawangi	4.63	5,124
32.11.16.2002	Cibunar	4.10	3,034
32.11.16.2003	Pangadegan	14.87	5,478
32.11.16.2009	Cibungur	5.25	3,497
Totals	Rancakalong	55.06	44,535

The district is a highland area intermediate between Sumedang town (the regency capital) and the districts which form the northeastern part of Bandung Metropolitan Area. Sukamaju, Sukahayu and Cibungur desa in the east are suburban to Sumedang town, while the other seven desa to the west look towards the Bandung region (although Pangadegan desa in the north is more clearly rural).
