= North Sumedang =

North Sumedang Sumedang Utara Sumedang Kalér
- District

Regional transcription(s)
  - Sundanese: ᮞᮥᮙᮨᮓᮀ ᮊᮜᮦᮁ
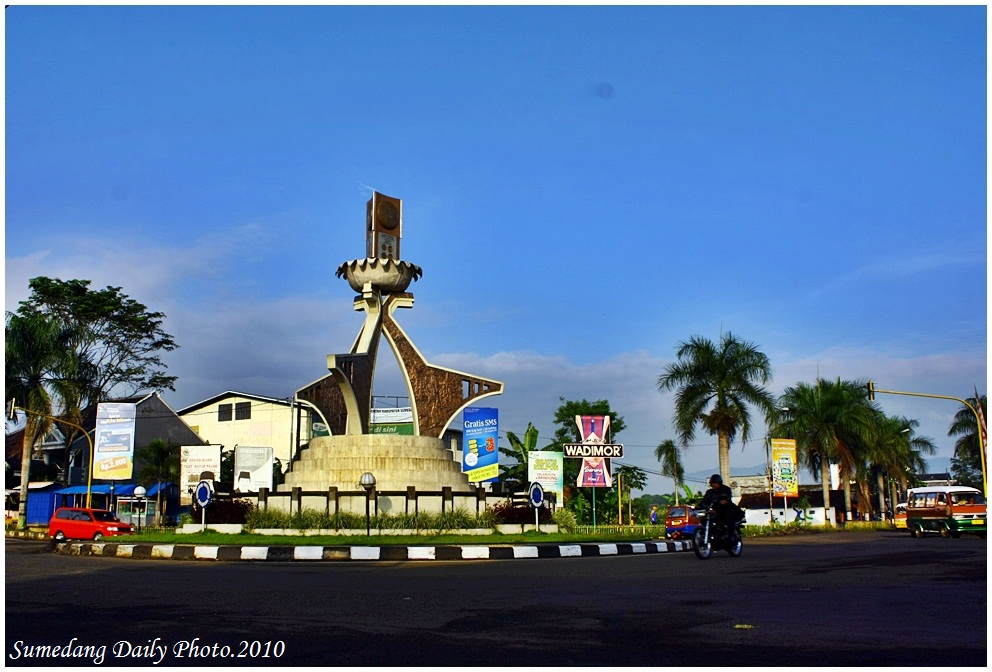
- Adipura Monument in Alamsari Roundabout
- Etymology: Kingdom of Sumedang Larang
- Location in Java and Indonesia North Sumedang (Indonesia)
- Coordinates: 6.85°S 107.92°E
- Country: Indonesia
- Province: West Java
- Regency: Sumedang Regency

Government
  - Camat: Nandang Suparman
  - Secretary: Ellyana

Area
  - Total: 29.54 km^{2} (11.41 sq mi)
- Elevation: 468 m (1,535 ft)

Population (mid 2024 estimate)
  - Total: 103,797
  - Density: 3,514/km^{2} (9,101/sq mi)
- Time zone: UTC+7 (IWT)
- Postal code: 4532x
- Area code: (+62) 261
- Villages: 13
- Website: Official website

North Sumedang (Indonesian: Sumedang Utara, Sundanese: ᮞᮥᮙᮨᮓᮀ ᮊᮜᮦᮁ; Sumedang Kalér) is an administrative district (kecamatan) in Sumedang Regency, part of the province of West Java in Indonesia which serves as the regency seat of Sumedang Regency. It is located halfway along the provincial route connecting Bandung and Cirebon. The district covers a land area of 29.54 km^{2}, and had a population of 103,797 as at mid 2024.

The Cisumdawu Toll Road was planned to connect to the district in 2021, to ease travels and economic activities between Bandung, Sumedang and Kertajati International Airport.

North Sumedang is one of districts of Sumedang Regency known for its production of Tahu sumedang, a local Sundanese variant of tofu popular in West Java and other provinces of Indonesia.

== Administrative divisions ==
North Sumedang District (Kecamatan Sumedang Utara) is composed of thirteen villages, comprising three urban kelurahan and ten rural desa. They are listed below with their areas and their populations as at the mid 2024 official estimates, together with their post codes.

Kode Wilayah	Name	Area in km^{2}	Pop'n Estimate mid 2024	Post code
32.11.18.1001	Kotakaler	1.56	12,945	45322
32.11.18.1002	Situ	2.96	17,473	45323
32.11.18.1003	Talun	0.55	6,734	45321
32.11.18.2004	Padasuka	1.72	4,817	45321
32.11.18.2005	Mulyasari	2.08	4,925	45321
32.11.18.2006	Girimukti	2.74	7,571	45321
32.11.18.2007	Mekarjaya	3.16	7,841	45321
32.11.18.2008	Margamukti	2.61	5,513	45321
32.11.18.2009	Sirnamulya	3.50	5,236	45321
32.11.18.2010	Kebonjati	1.95	4,635	45321
32.11.18.2011	Jatihurip	2.59	11,318	45321
32.11.18.2012	Jatimulya	1.60	6,956	45321
32.11.18.2013	Rancamulya	2.52	7,833	45321
Totals	North Sumedang	29.54	103,797	

== Climate ==
North Sumedang has a tropical monsoon climate (Am) with short dry season from June to September and very significant rainfall in December, January and March.

Climate data for North Sumedang
Month	Jan	Feb	Mar	Apr	May	Jun	Jul	Aug	Sep	Oct	Nov	Dec	Year
Mean daily maximum °C (°F)	28.6 (83.5)	28.7 (83.7)	29.0 (84.2)	29.5 (85.1)	29.6 (85.3)	29.5 (85.1)	29.3 (84.7)	29.9 (85.8)	30.5 (86.9)	30.8 (87.4)	29.9 (85.8)	29.3 (84.7)	29.6 (85.2)
Daily mean °C (°F)	24.5 (76.1)	24.5 (76.1)	24.6 (76.3)	24.9 (76.8)	24.9 (76.8)	24.4 (75.9)	24.1 (75.4)	24.3 (75.7)	24.8 (76.6)	25.3 (77.5)	25.1 (77.2)	24.8 (76.6)	24.7 (76.4)
Mean daily minimum °C (°F)	20.5 (68.9)	20.3 (68.5)	20.3 (68.5)	20.4 (68.7)	20.3 (68.5)	19.3 (66.7)	18.9 (66.0)	18.7 (65.7)	19.1 (66.4)	19.8 (67.6)	20.3 (68.5)	20.4 (68.7)	19.9 (67.7)
Average rainfall mm (inches)	380 (15.0)	300 (11.8)	360 (14.2)	290 (11.4)	190 (7.5)	85 (3.3)	75 (3.0)	60 (2.4)	54 (2.1)	135 (5.3)	265 (10.4)	350 (13.8)	2,544 (100.2)
Source: Climate-Data.org
