= Tahu goreng =

Southeast Asian fried tofu dish

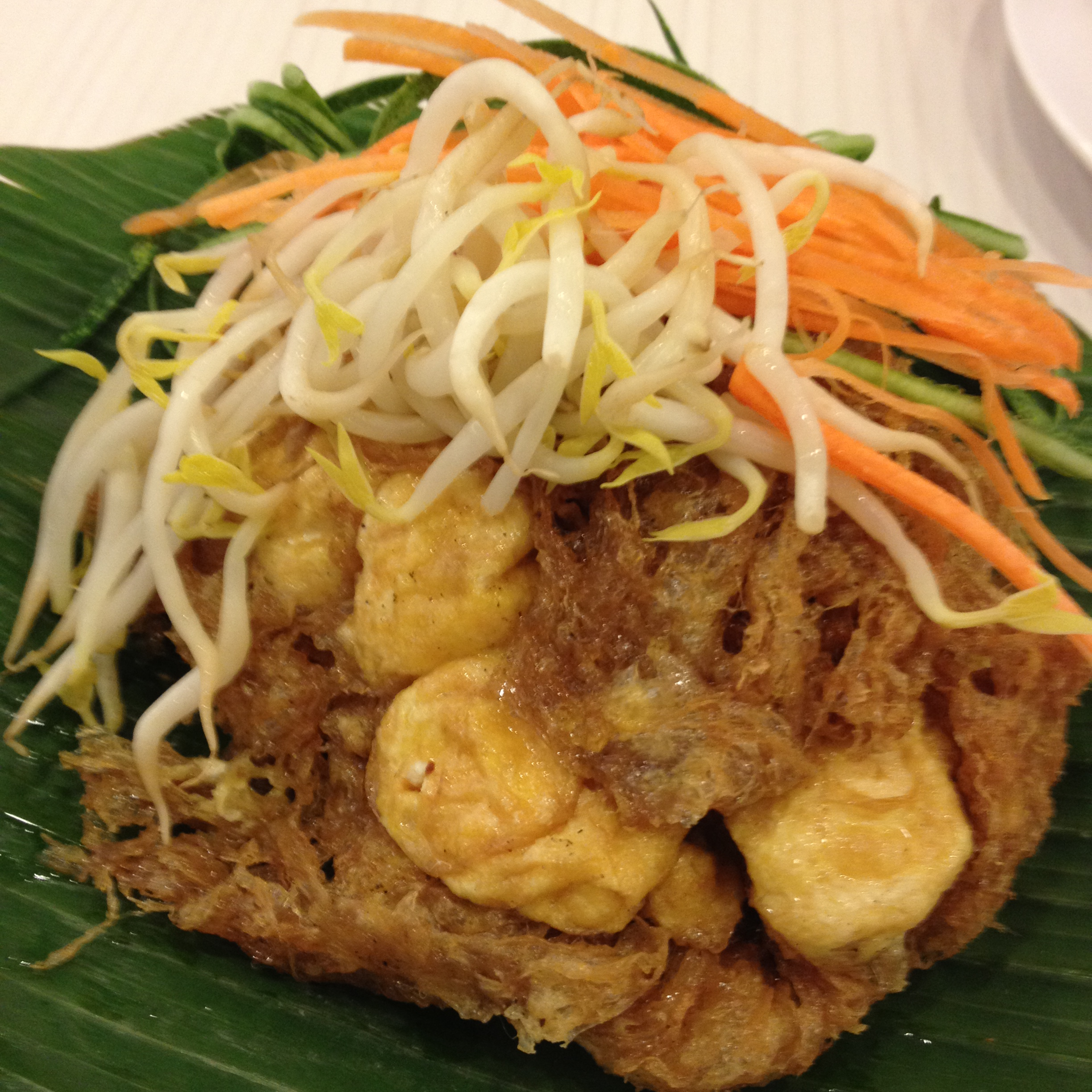
- Indonesian tahu goreng and omelette arranged on a plate garnished with bean sprouts, cucumber and carrot
- Alternative names: Tauhu goreng (Malaysian and Singaporean spelling)
- Associated cuisine: Indonesian, Malaysian, Singaporean
- Main ingredients: tofu

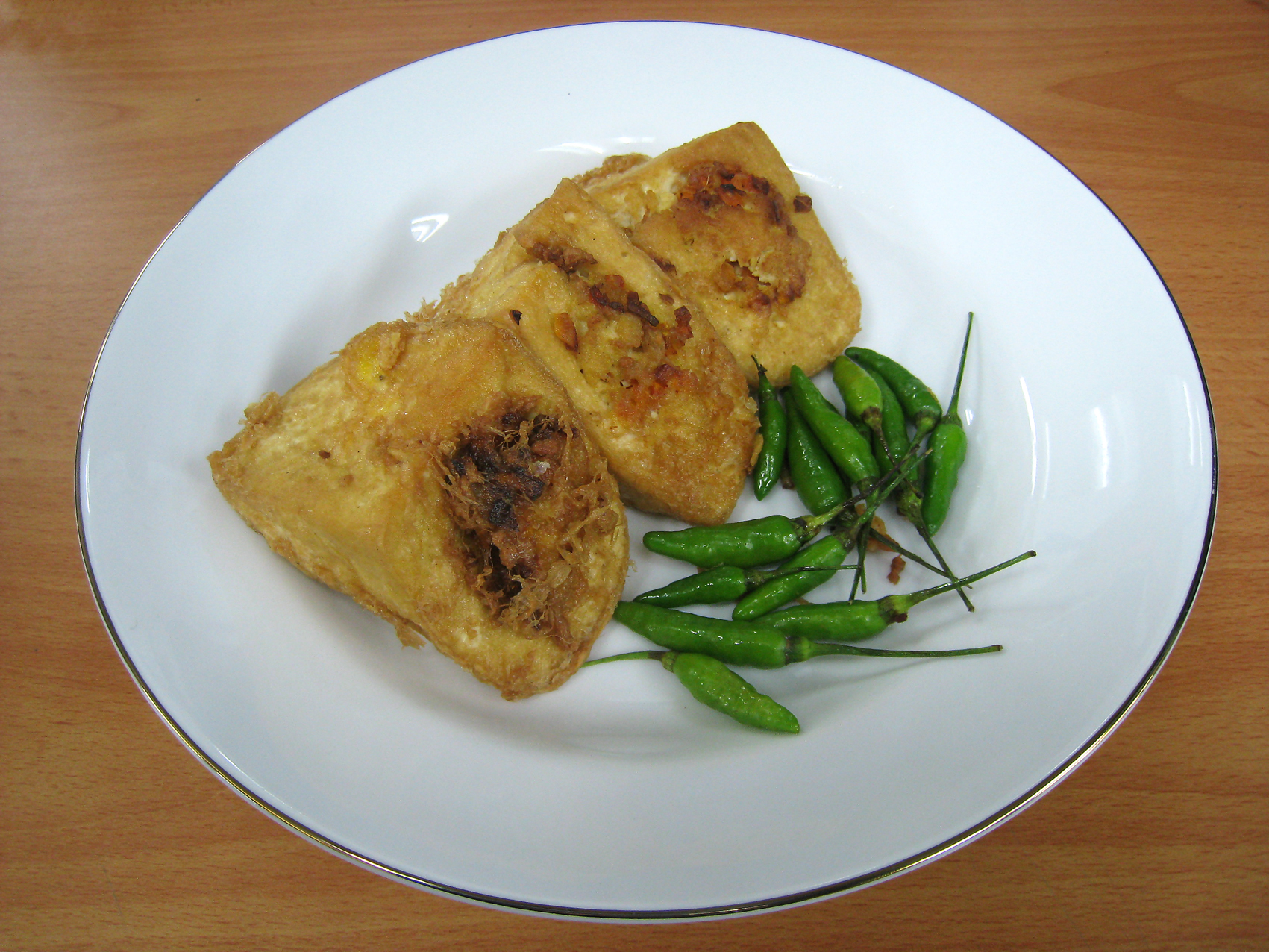
Tahu isi (filled tofu) served with bird's eye chili

Tahu goreng (Indonesian spelling) or tauhu goreng (Bruneian, Malaysian and Singaporean spelling) is a generic name for any type of fried tofu dish in the cuisines of Indonesia, Brunei, Malaysia and Singapore.

== Preparation ==
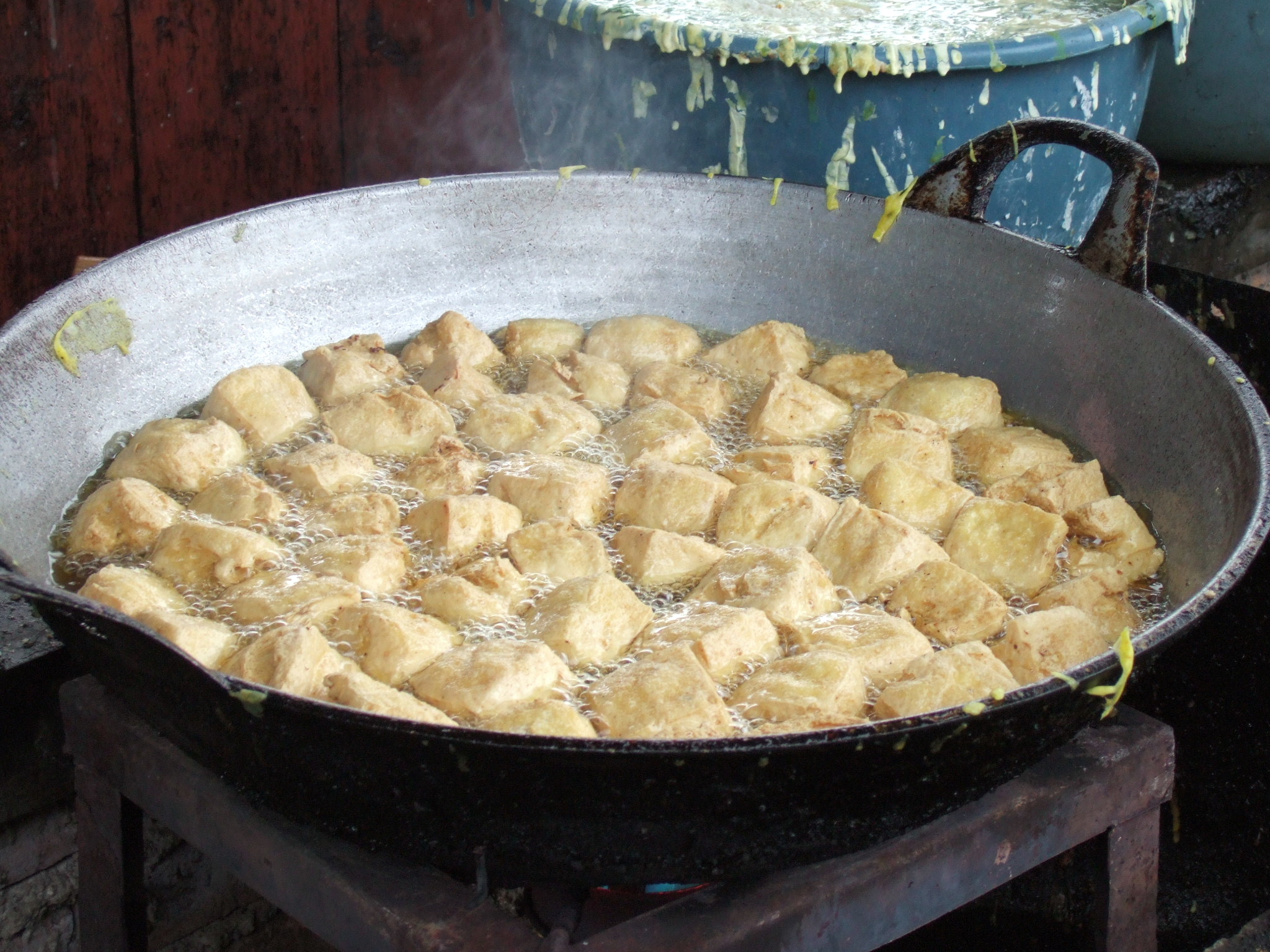
Tofu being fried in Indonesia

When preparing the dish, cakes of hard tofu are deep-fried until golden brown. A popular way to serve fried tofu is to cut them diagonally in half and arrange on a plate garnished with bean sprouts, cucumber, and scallion. A thick sauce is prepared with shallots, garlic, chili peppers, shrimp paste, soy sauce, and tamarind juice.

== Cultural origins ==
In Malay language and Indonesian, tauhu or tahu refers to 'tofu' and goreng indicates 'fried'. Tofu originated from China and was brought to Southeast Asia by Chinese immigrants to the region. Its first arrival in Indonesia is estimated through the Khubilai Khan's army in Kediri in 1292.

== Variations ==
=== Indonesia ===
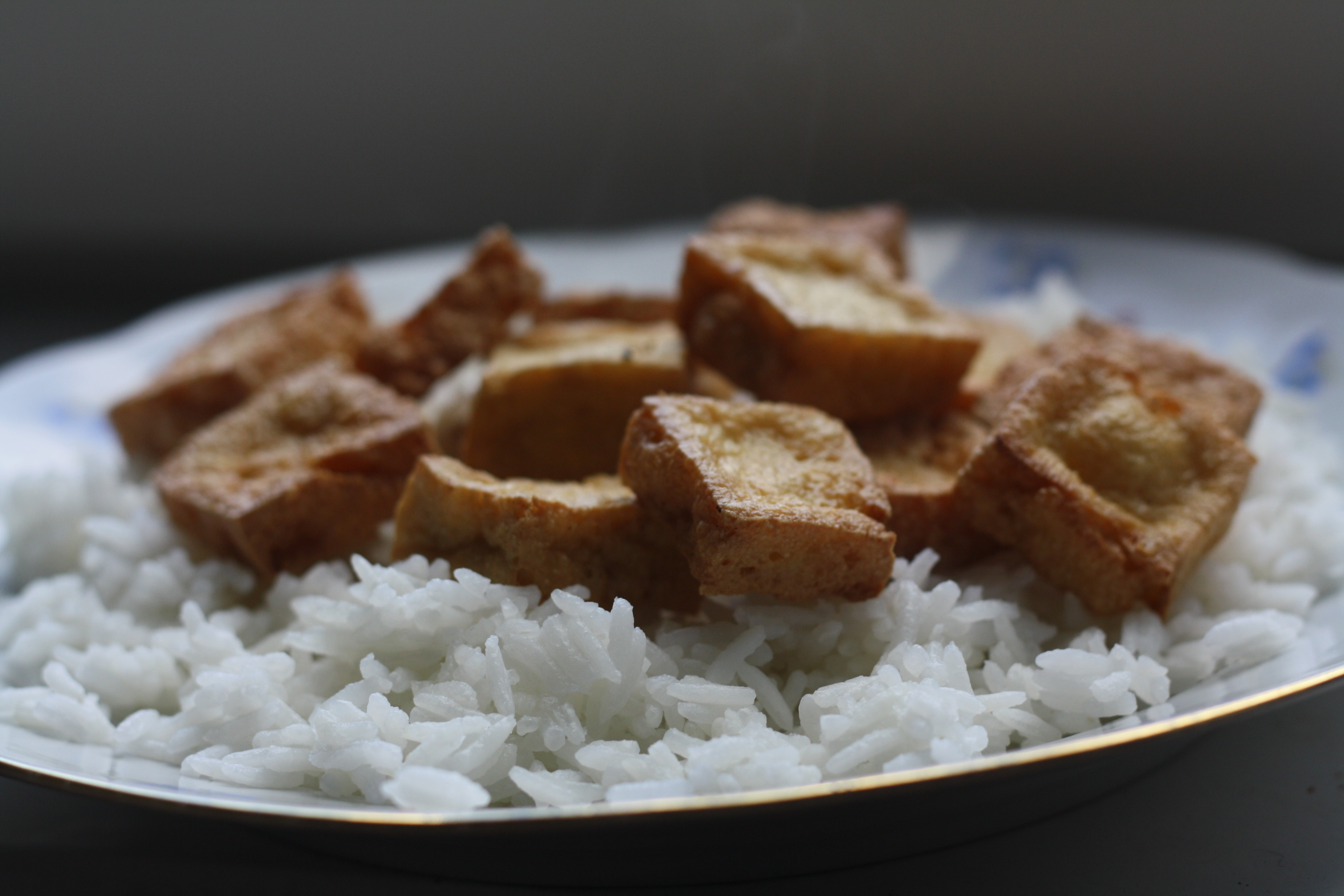
Plain 'tahu goreng' on white rice, without side dishes and embellishments.

In Indonesia, tahu goreng can be mildly fried or deep fried, plain or battered. In Indonesia, tahu goreng is usually eaten with sambal kecap a kind of sambal hot condiment made from kecap manis (sweet soy sauce) and chopped chili peppers and shallots. Some variants might use peanut sauce with chili instead. Some variants are:

- Tahu isi: (lit: filled tofu), probably the most popular variant of tahu goreng in Indonesia, is tofu filled with bean sprouts, carrots and sometimes minced meat is battered and deep fried. It is commonly found sold by gorengan (Indonesian fritters) vendors. Commonly eaten with cabai rawit (bird's eye chili).
- Tahu sumedang: the name derived from Sumedang city, West Java. Pioneered by the Tahu Bunkeng tofu store in Sumedang established by Chinese immigrants in 1917.
- Tahu gejrot: fried tofu in a thin, hot, sweet, and sour sauce with shallots and chilies, originated from Cirebon City, West Java.
- Tahu taoge: stir-fried diced tofu with beansprouts.
- Tahu campur: (lit: mixed tofu), with beef slices, vegetables, beansprouts, and noodles or rice vermicelli, served in thin broth. The dish is common in East Javan cities, such as Malang, Surabaya, and Lamongan.
- Tahu gunting: (lit: tofu cut with scissors), fried tofu in thick sweet and spicy peanut sauce, originated from Surabaya city, East Java.
- Tahu telur: (lit: tofu with egg), with omelette, beansprout, peanuts, and lontong rice cake, served in thin sweet and sour soy sauce. Also originated from Surabaya City, East Java.
- Tahu bulat (round tofu) or tahu bola also called bola-bola tahu (tofu balls): is a relatively new variant of fried tofu from Tasikmalaya. The tofu is mixed with seasoning and shaped in balls or rounded form, and later deep-fried in cooking oil.
- Kupat tahu: (lit: ketupat with tofu), ketupat rice cake, beansprout, served in thick sweet and spicy peanut sauce, common throughout Java, however the most popular variant came from Kuningan, Magelang, Solo, and Surabaya.

== See also ==
- Batagor
- Yong tau foo
- List of tofu dishes
- List of deep-fried foods
- Indonesian cuisine
- Malaysian cuisine
- Singaporean cuisine
