= Sumedang Regency =

Regency in West Java, Indonesia

Sumedang Regency Kabupaten Sumedang Sumedang Larang
- Regency

Other transcription(s)
  - Sundanese: ᮊᮘᮥᮕᮒᮦᮔ᮪ ᮞᮥᮙᮨᮓᮀ
- Coat of arms
- Motto: Insun Medal Tandang (Orderly, Safe, Comfortable, Peaceful, Elegant)
- Location within West Java

- Location in Java and Indonesia Sumedang Regency (Indonesia)
- Coordinates: 6.86°S 107.92°E
- Country: Indonesia
- Province: West Java
- Capital: North Sumedang

Government
  - Regent: Dony Ahmad Munir
  - Vice Regent: Fajar Aldila

Area
  - Total: 1,558.72 km^{2} (601.83 sq mi)

Population (mid 2025)
  - Total: 1,195,531
  - Density: 766.995/km^{2} (1,986.51/sq mi)
- Demonyms: Sumedangite; Warga Sumedang (id); Urang Sumedang (su)
- Time zone: UTC+7 (IWST)
- Area code: (+62) 261
- Website: sumedangkab.go.id

Sumedang Regency is a landlocked regency (kabupaten) of the West Java Province of Indonesia. The regency covers an area of 1,558.72 km^{2} and had a population of 1,093,602 at the 2010 Census and 1,152,507 at the 2020 Census; the official estimate as at mid 2025 was 1,195,531 (comprising 601,748 males and 593,783 females) based on projections, but other data sourced from the records of the Sumedang Regency Population and Civil Registration Service in 2025 is 1,233,691 people (with 622,941 male and 610,750 female residents). Its administrative centre is in the district of North Sumedang, one of the two administrative districts which form the town of Sumedang. The town of Sumedang is famous for its tofu (Tahu bungkeng), which was first produced by a Chinese immigrant from Qing China.

== Administrative districts ==
Sumedang Regency is divided into twenty-six districts (kecamatan), listed below with their areas and populations at the 2010 Census and 2020 Census, together with the official estimates as at mid 2025. The table also includes the locations of the district administrative centres, the number of administrative villages in each district (totaling 270 rural desa and 7 urban kelurahan), and its postcode.

Kode Wilayah	Name of District (kecamatan)	Area in km^{2}.	Pop'n 2010 Census	Pop'n 2020 Census	Pop'n mid 2025 Estimate	Admin centre	No. of villages	Post code
32.11.15	Jatinangor	31.60	107,695	98,034	101,493	Hegarmanah	12	45360
32.11.14	Cimanggung	55.55	80,372	87,516	91,399	Sindangpakuon	11	45364
32.11.11	Tanjungsari	44.86	76,275	85,615	90,737	Tanjungsari	12	45362
32.11.12	Sukasari	41.82	31,105	32,495	33,263	Sukasari	7	45366
32.11.13	Pamulihan	50.70	54,306	61,962	66,191	Ciptasari	11	45365
32.11.16	Rancakalong	55.07	37,492	39,740	40,966	Nagarawangi	10	45361
32.11.17	Sumedang Selatan (South Sumedang)	92.51	73,881	78,437	80,920	Pasanggrahan Baru	14 ^{(a)}	45311: 45315
32.11.18	Sumedang Utara (North Sumedang)	30.40	88,161	97,997	103,373	Talun	13 ^{(b)}	45321: 45323
32.11.19	Ganeas	22.90	23,398	25,267	26,282	Cikoneng	8	45356
32.11.06	Situraja	43.23	35,910	41,194	43,801	Situraja	15	45371
32.11.05	Cisitu	65.03	26,185	29,715	31,455	Situmekar	10	45363
32.11.03	Darmaraja	49.38	37,028	35,860	35,939	Darmaraja	12	45372
32.11.04	Cibugel	59.52	20,787	23,735	25,170	Cibugel	7	45375
32.11.01	Wado	84.27	42,959	43,584	43,987	Wado	10	45373
32.11.02	Jatinunggal	72.12	41,198	44,811	46,775	Sirnasari	9	45376
32.11.26	Jatigede	106.24	23,701	21,898	21,946	Cijeungjing	11	45377
32.11.24	Tomo	84.74	23,562	22,982	23,033	Tomo	9	45382
32.11.25	Ujungjaya	86.23	29,033	30,987	32,050	Ujungjaya	9	45383
32.11.07	Conggeang	106.98	28,855	28,233	28,296	Conggeangwetan	12	45391
32.11.08	Paseh	31.62	35,848	37,423	38,294	Paseh Kidul	10	45381
32.11.22	Cimalaka	43.29	56,465	61,898	64,855	Cimalaka	14	45353
32.11.23	Cisarua	17.71	19,028	20,228	20,882	Cisarua	7	45355
32.11.20	Tanjungkerta	43.72	33,436	33,822	34,086	Sukamantri	12	45354
32.11.21	Tanjungmedar	60.67	24,152	25,789	26,679	Kertamukti	9	45352
32.11.10	Buahdua	107.68	31,921	31,883	31,954	Buahdua	14	45392
32.11.09	Surian	70.88	10,849	11,402	11,705	Surian	9	45393
	Totals	1,558.72	1,093,602	1,152,507	1,195,531	Sumedang	277	

Notes: (a) comprising 4 kelurahan (Cipameungpeuk, Kotakulon, Pasanggrahan and Regol Wetan) and 10 desa.
(b) comprising 3 kelurahan (Kotakaler, Situ and Talun) and 10 desa.

The first five districts named above - Jatinangor, Cimanggung, Tanjungsari, Sukasari, and Pamulihan - are in the southwest corner of Sumedang Regency adjacent to Bandung City and Bandung Regency, and lie within the Bandung Metropolitan Area. They cover 224.53 km^{2} and had a combined population of 349,750 at the 2010 Census, and 365,622 at the 2020 Census; their official estimate as at mid 2025 was 383,083, whereas local registration data indicates a population for that date of 394,769 in these five districts.

== Jatigede Dam ==
In August 2011, the project of constructing the Jatigede Dam on the Cimanuk River was begun. The dam capacity is almost one billion cubic metre and is Indonesia's second-biggest dam in capacity after the Jatiluhur Dam.

The agreement to make a hydropower plant with a capacity of 2x25 megawatts and an estimated cost of $224.4 million was signed in December 2011. The production was incorporated into the Java-Bali 150KiloVolt transmission system in 2015.

== Waterfalls ==
In Citengah village area, South Sumedang district there are 18 waterfalls. Citengah agro-tourism and waterfalls village can be reached from Sumedang Central Park to the east through the Cipameungpeuk bridge. The unique waterfalls are the Cigorobog waterfall with its 4-step waterfalls, 30 meters Cimecek waterfall, and U-shape Ciparahu waterfall. The environment is well preserved with monkeys and wild pigs on the hill.
