= Tahu gejrot =

Indonesian fried tofu

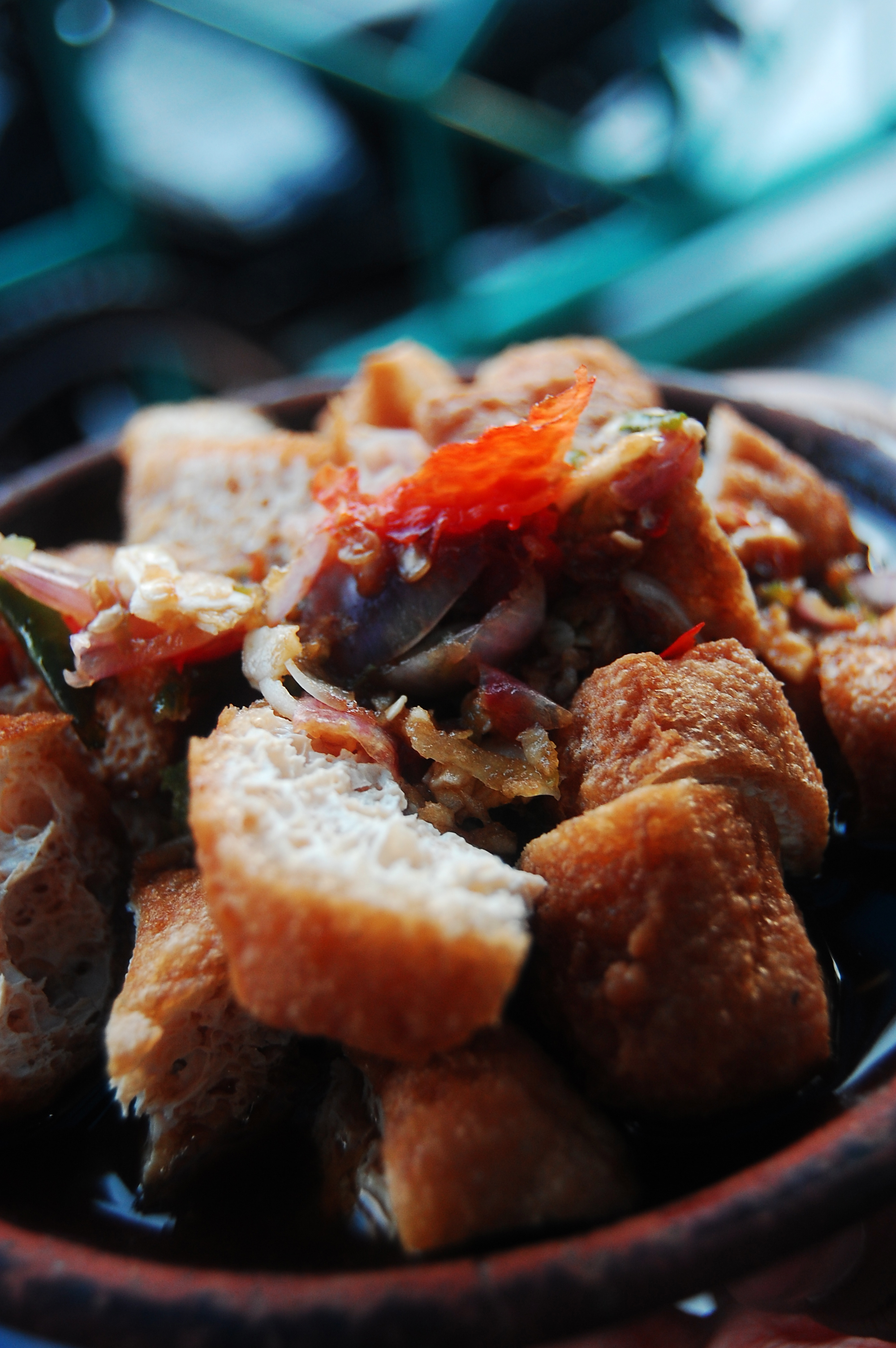
- Type: Tofu dish
- Place of origin: Indonesia
- Region or state: West Java
- Main ingredients: Fried tofu

Tahu Gejrot is an Indonesian fried tofu in sweet spicy sauce from Cirebon, a port city in West Java, Indonesia. Tahu gejrot consists of tahu pong, a type of hollow tahu goreng (fried tofu) cut into small pieces. It is served with a thin and watery dressing that is made by blending palm sugar, vinegar and sweet soy sauce. It is usually served in a small earthenware bowl or layah, with ground garlic, pounded shallot and hot bird's eye chili cut into pieces to add spiciness. Tahu gejrot is usually served in a clay plate.

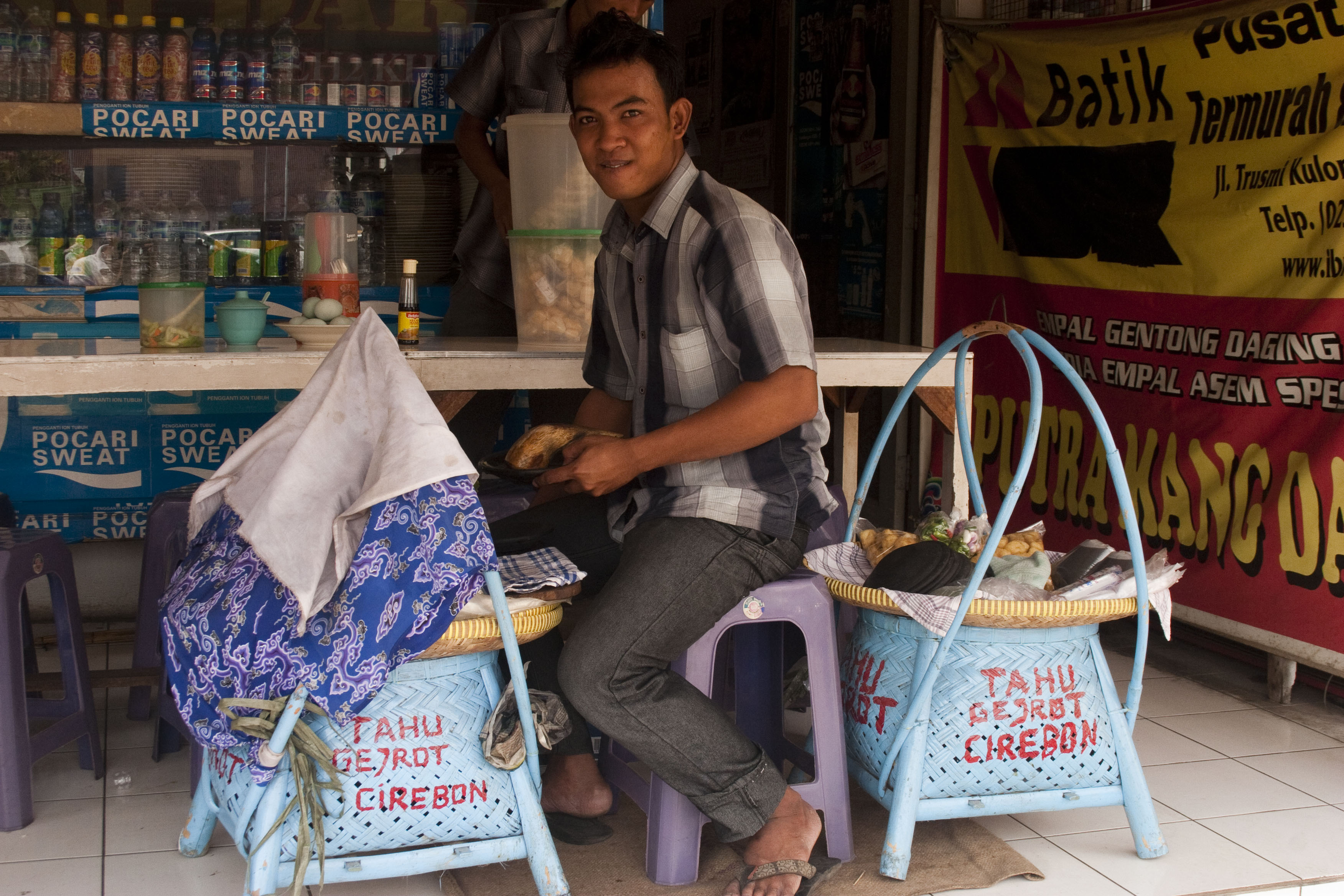
Tahu gejrot street vendor

== See also ==
- Tahu goreng
- Tahu Sumedang
