= Situraja =

District in Sumedang Regency, West Java

- Town and District
- Interactive map of Situraja
- Coordinates: 6.8458025°S 108.025014°E
- Country: Indonesia
- Province: West Java
- Regency: Sumedang Regency

Area
  - Total: 53.6 km^{2} (20.7 sq mi)
- Elevation: 324 m (1,063 ft)
- Highest elevation: 420 m (1,380 ft)
- Lowest elevation: 257 m (843 ft)

Population (2020 census)
  - Total: 41,194
  - Density: 769/km^{2} (1,990/sq mi)
- Time zone: UTC+7 (IWST)
- Area code: (+62) 251
- Vehicle registration: F
- Villages: 15

Situraja is a district (kecamatan) of Sumedang Regency, in West Java Province, Indonesia.

As of 2020, the population of the district was 41,194. The most widely cultivated crops are chili peppers and tomatoes.

The climate is tropical monsoon.

== Villages ==
- Ambit
- Bangbayang
- Cicarimanah
- Cijati
- Cijeler
- Cikadu
- Jatimekar
- Kaduwulung
- Karangheuleut
- Malaka
- Mekarmulya
- North Situraja
- Pamulihan
- Situraja
- Sukatila
