= Prabu Geusan Ulun Museum =

Museum in West Java, Indonesia

The Prabu Geusan Ulun Museum is a museum located in Sumedang on West Java, Indonesia. It is located on Geusan Ulun Road 40B.

The museum houses a collection of traditional Sundanese weaponry, as well as the crown jewels and other finery.

== Literature ==
- Lenzi, Iola (2004). Museums of Southeast Asia. Singapore: Archipelago Press. p. 200 pages. ISBN 981-4068-96-9.
