= Huai'an Pingqiao tofu =

Chinese dish

Huai'an Pingqiao tofu is a Chinese dish which mixes tofu with seafood, mushrooms and chicken The dish is very smooth like Ningzhi, and the chicken slices are very soft, like yarn. So it wins a high reputation as "Xi Shi tofu".

== History ==
Huai'an is one of the origins of Huaiyang cuisine, and Pingqiao is the small town in Huan'an. Tradition holds that the dish was served to the Qianlong Emperor of the Qing dynasty during the emperor's tour of Pingqiao. In order to please the emperor and get some rewards, Lin Baiwan, a local landowner, had the road from Shanyang City to Pingqiao Zhen decorated with lanterns, colored banners and faille and invited the emperor to his home. While he was steeping the Crane Tea, a speciality of Huai'an, his cook was braising tofu containing Carp brain and mother chicken juice for the emperor. When the cook presented the dish, the house was immediately filled with the pleasant aroma. Although the emperor had tasted many delicacies from land and sea, he was so pleased with the dish that he gave it his royal seal of approval, and named the dish "the best food in China". Since then, Pingqiao tofu has become one of the most famous dishes of Huaiyang cuisine.

== Development ==
Over 200 years, Pingqiao tofu has been well known at home and abroad through many chefs' refinement. In 1984, the government used it as a dish to accept Japanese and the American Chinese. In 1986, 11 countries representatives tasted it and were very content with it. It was also published in the People's Daily and Yangcheng News. What's more, it was also a favourite food of Zhou Enlai. Hu Yaobang has also spoken highly of Pingqiao tofu when he comes to Huai'an. He encouraged Huai'an to set up a Huaiyang restaurant in Beijing. This dish has been recorded in "Chinese Dishes Canon".

== Nutrition and health information ==
The dish is relatively high in protein, fatty acids and many other nutrients such as vitamins and calcium.

== See also ==
- List of tofu dishes
