= Pidan doufu =

Chinese cold tofu dish

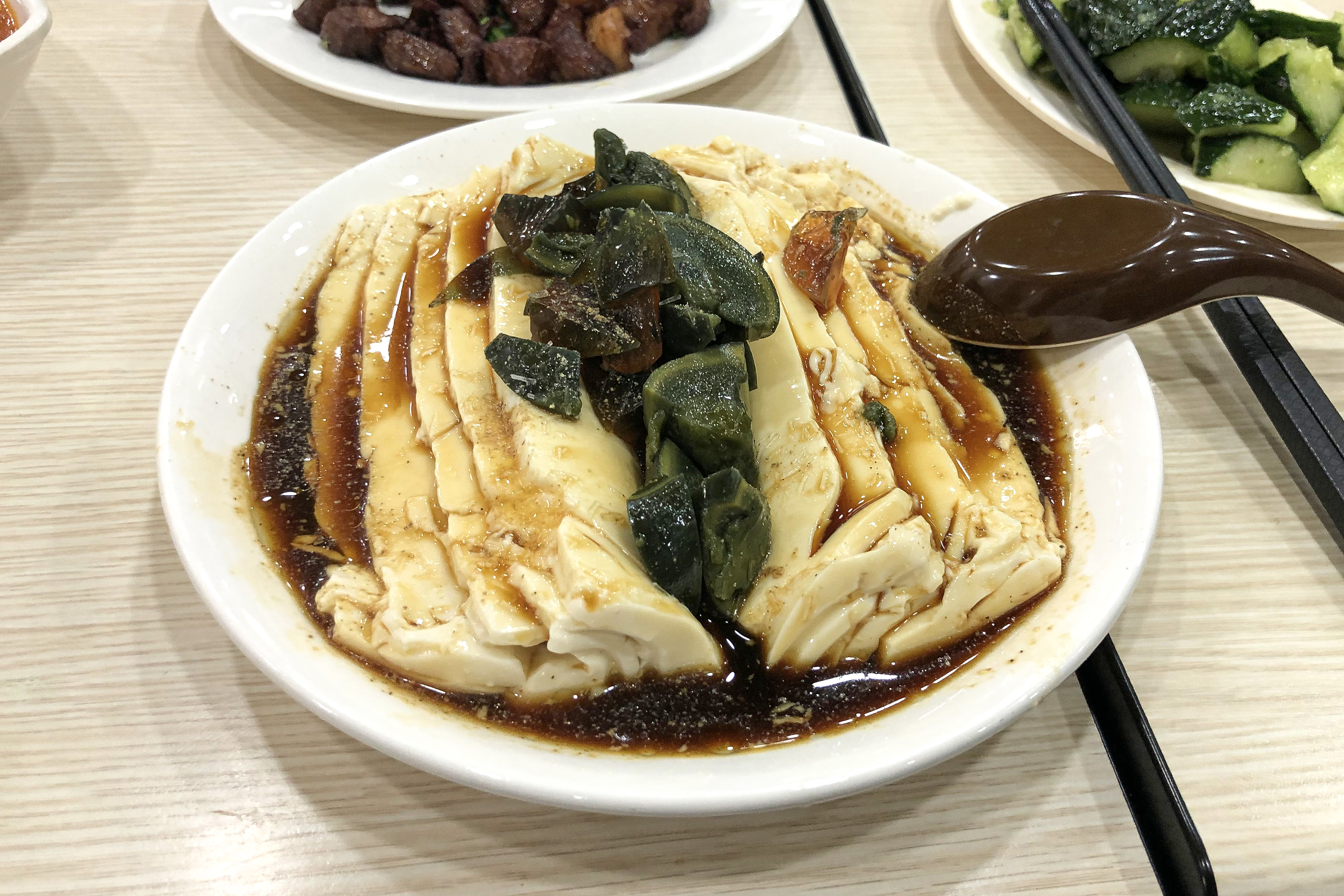
- Pidan doufu
- Alternative names: Pidan tofu
- Course: Starter
- Place of origin: China
- Main ingredients: Tofu, thousand-year-old egg

Pidan doufu 皮蛋豆腐 is a cold tofu dish consisting of slices of silken tofu topped with diced thousand-year-old eggs (皮蛋 or 松花蛋), minced garlic and spring onion, and a splash of soy sauce and Chinese vinegar.

== See also ==
- List of tofu dishes
