= Yong tau foo =

Tofu filled with ground meat or fish

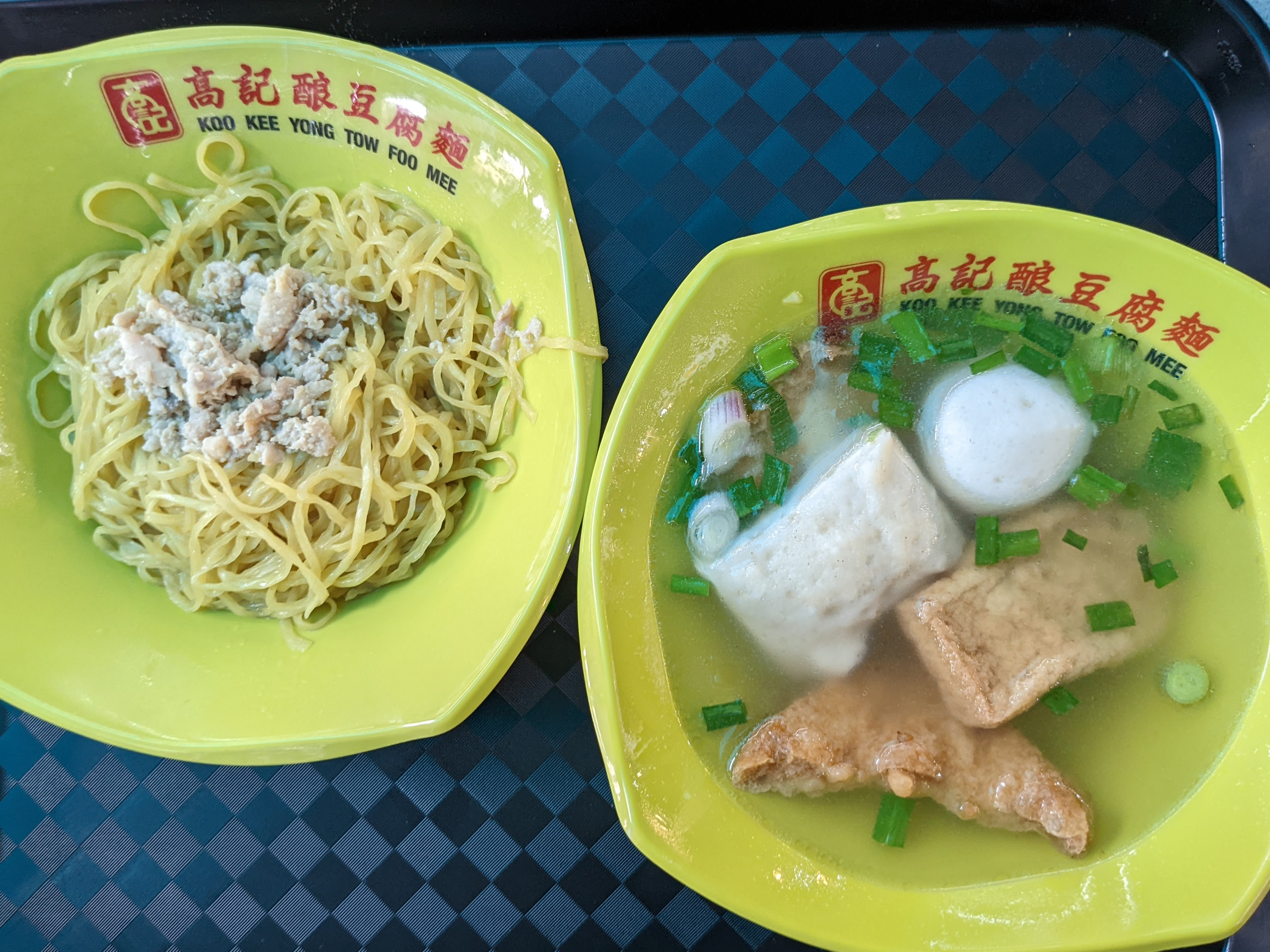
- Yong tau foo soup (right) with noodles
- Type: Main course, soup
- Place of origin: China
- Main ingredients: Tofu, meat paste (fish and ground meat)

Yong tau foo

Chinese name
- Traditional Chinese: 釀豆腐
- Simplified Chinese: 酿豆腐
- Literal meaning: "stuffed bean curd"
Transcriptions
Standard Mandarin
- Hanyu Pinyin: niàngdòufu
Hakka
- Romanization: Ngiong Tew Foo
- Pha̍k-fa-sṳ: Ngiòng-theu-fú
Yue: Cantonese
- Jyutping: joeng6 dau6 fu6
Southern Min
- Hokkien POJ: jiōng-tāu-hū / liōng-tāu-hū

Vietnamese name
- Vietnamese: khổ qua cà ớt
- Literal meaning: "bitter melon (and) chili pepper"

Thai name
- Thai: ก๋วยเตี๋ยวแคะ/ เย็นตาโฟ

Yong tau foo (simplified Chinese: 酿豆腐; traditional Chinese: 釀豆腐; also spelled yong tao foo, yong tau fu, yong tau hu or yong tofu; ก๋วยเตี๋ยวแคะ in Thailand) is a Hakka Chinese dish consisting primarily of tofu filled with ground meat mixture or fish paste. Variations on this dish feature vegetables and mushrooms, rather than tofu, stuffed with ground meat or fish paste. Yong tau foo is eaten in numerous ways, either dry with a sauce or served as a soup dish.

It is commonly found in parts of China, Indonesia, Malaysia, Singapore, Thailand, Vietnam, and in cities where there are large Hakka populations.

== History ==
The Hakka people initiated a southward migration to escape conflicts in Northern China, eventually settling in Southern China after a series of relocations. Due to the unavailability of wheat flour traditionally used for making dumpling skins during festivals, they used tofu instead. The Hakka term nyong, meaning the act of stuffing, gave rise to the dish known as yong tau foo, in which tofu is filled with various ingredients.

== Variations ==
=== Fried ===
Traditional Hakka versions of yong tau foo consist of tofu cubes stuffed and heaped with minced meat (usually lamb or pork) and herbs, then fried until golden brown, or sometimes braised. Variations include usage of various condiments, including eggplants, shiitake mushrooms, and bitter melon stuffed with the same meat paste. Traditionally, yong tau foo is served in a clear yellow bean stew along with the bitter melon and shiitake variants.

=== Soup ===
Particularly in the Southeast Asian Hakka diaspora, the term yong tau foo is used to describe a soup dish that substitutes minced meat with fish paste. The base of the dish is various forms of tofu stuffed with fish paste, but it is now common to stuff vegetables like bitter melon, okra, and chilis with fish paste as well, and the soup can include other ingredients like fish balls, crab sticks, cuttlefish, and sausages. The foods are then sliced into bite-size pieces, cooked briefly in boiling broth and then served either in the broth as soup or with the broth in a separate bowl ("dry"). The dish is eaten with chopsticks and a soup spoon and can be eaten by itself or served with a bowl of steamed rice, noodles or rice vermicelli. Another variation of this dish would be to serve it with laksa gravy or curry sauce. Essential accompaniments are a spicy, vinegary chili sauce, originally made with red fermented bean curd and distantly similar in taste to Sriracha sauce, and a distinctive brown sweet bean sauce or hoisin sauce for dipping.

=== Regional variations ===
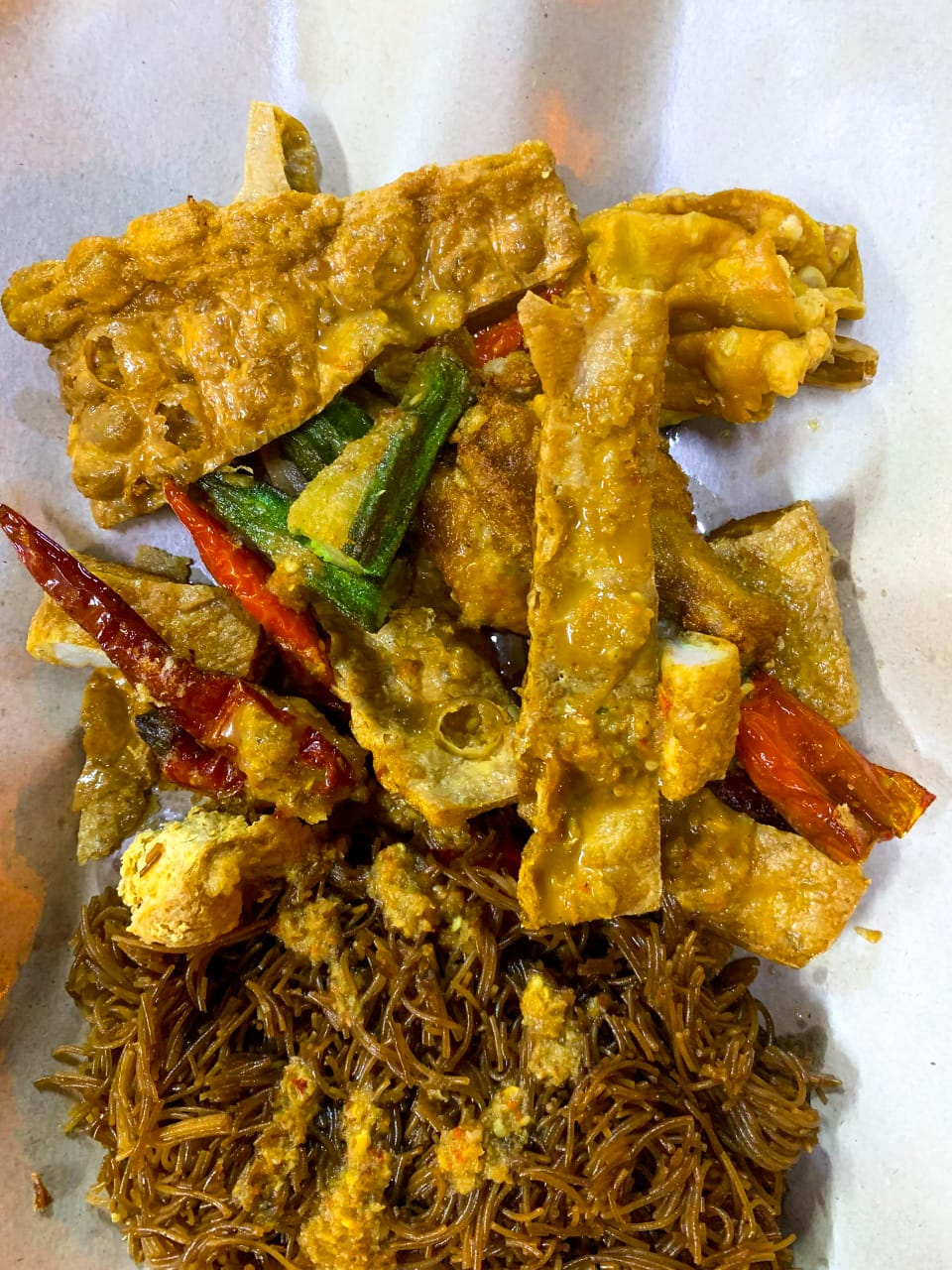
Yum‑Yum, a regional variation from Tawau, Sabah, Malaysia, is commonly fried and served with rice vermicelli and sambal

Yong tau foo exhibits diverse regional variations across Malaysia, with different areas offering their own unique interpretations of the dish. In the Klang Valley, particularly in Ampang, Selangor, which is situated just outside Kuala Lumpur, yong tau foo has become a signature local specialty. Ampang is often associated with the more traditional version of the dish, which features an assortment of tofu, vegetables, and fish paste, served either in a soup or dry with a variety of dipping sauces.

In contrast, the town of Tawau in Sabah has developed its own distinctive take on yong tau foo. The Tawau version is notably deep fried and is often eaten with sambal and fried mee hoon, making it a popular dinner option. This fried variation is colloquially known as "yum-yum," named after the original establishment that popularised it. Beyond the yong tau foo itself, the dish is frequently accompanied by chopped fried chicken, bishop's nose and chicken gizzards, adding extra flavor and texture. The Tawau-style yong tau foo has since grown in popularity, spreading to other parts of Sabah.

In Thailand, yentafo is a variation of yong tau foo that features a distinct pink-colored broth, created by the use of fermented bean paste and, sometimes, tomato. Modern Thai Yong Tau Foo might enhance the color with the addition of food coloring, giving the dish its unique pink appearance.

In Vietnam, particularly in southern regions, a similar dish known as khổ qua cà ớt is popular. It consists of fish paste, locally referred to as chả cá, which is stuffed into bitter melon, large chili peppers, fried tofu, eggplants, or tomatoes before being fried. This dish can be enjoyed on its own, dipped in a sauce, or served in a bowl with broth.

== Gallery ==
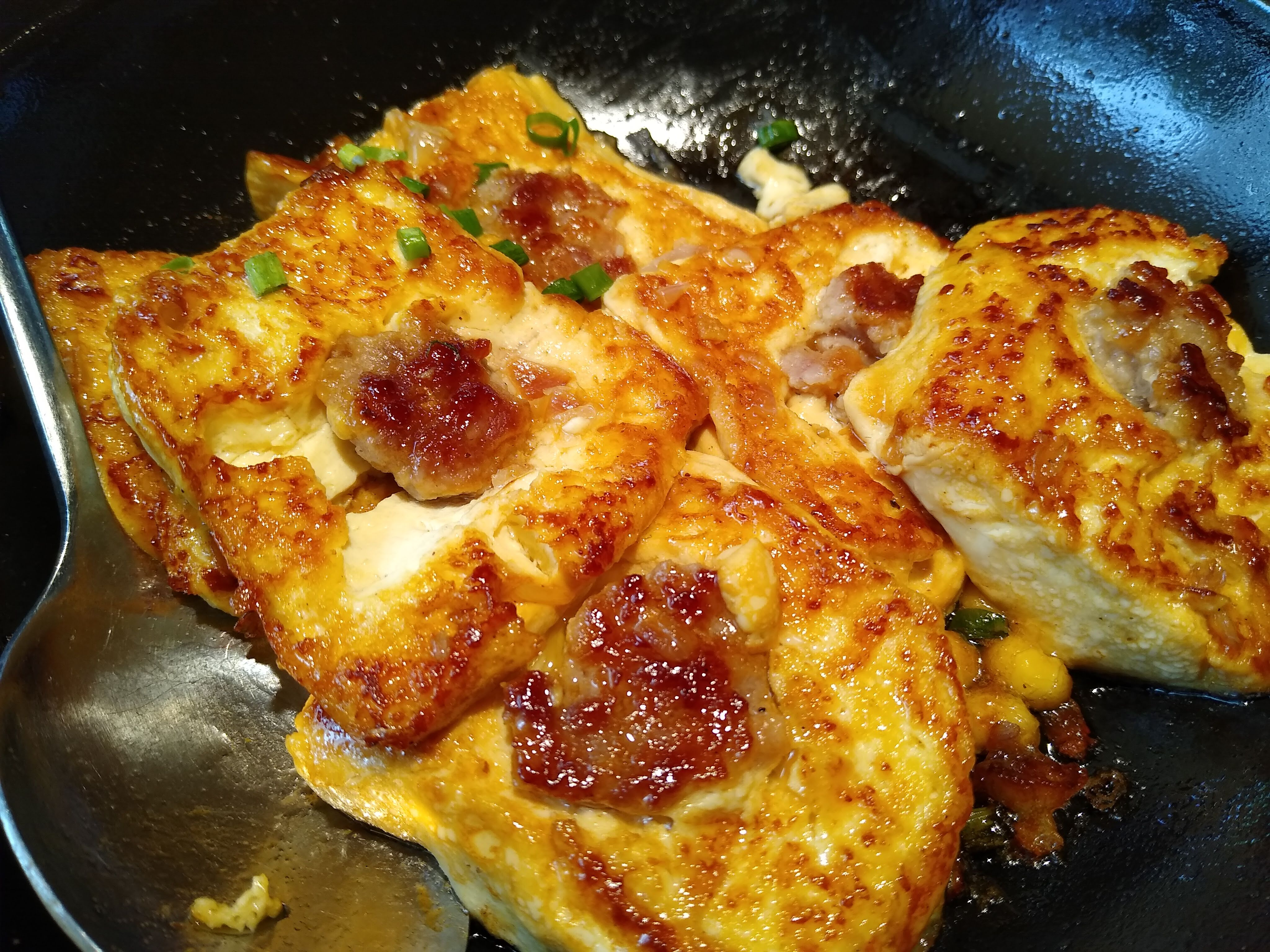
Traditional braised yong tau foo

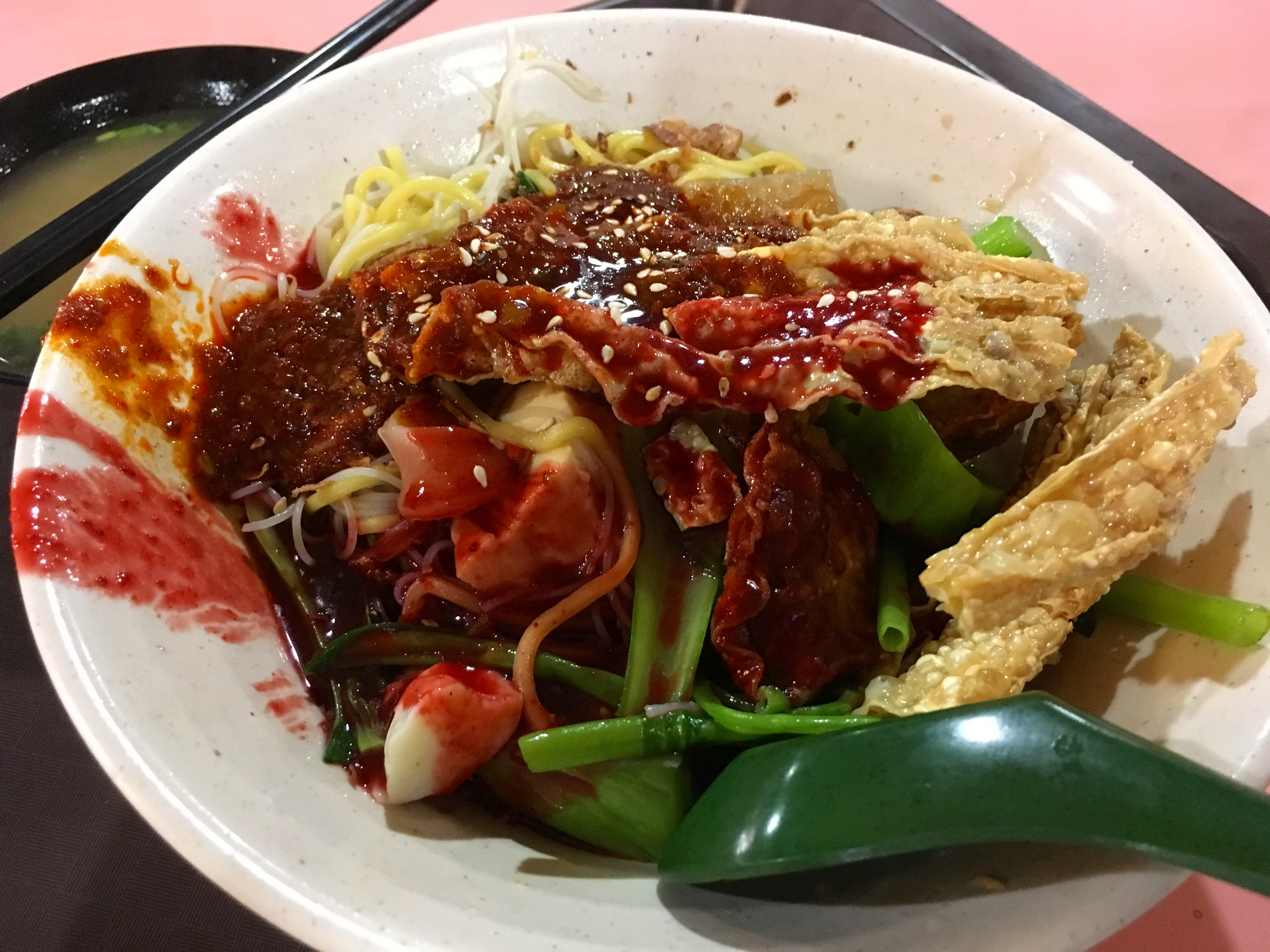
Hakka yong tau foo served with brown sweet bean sauce

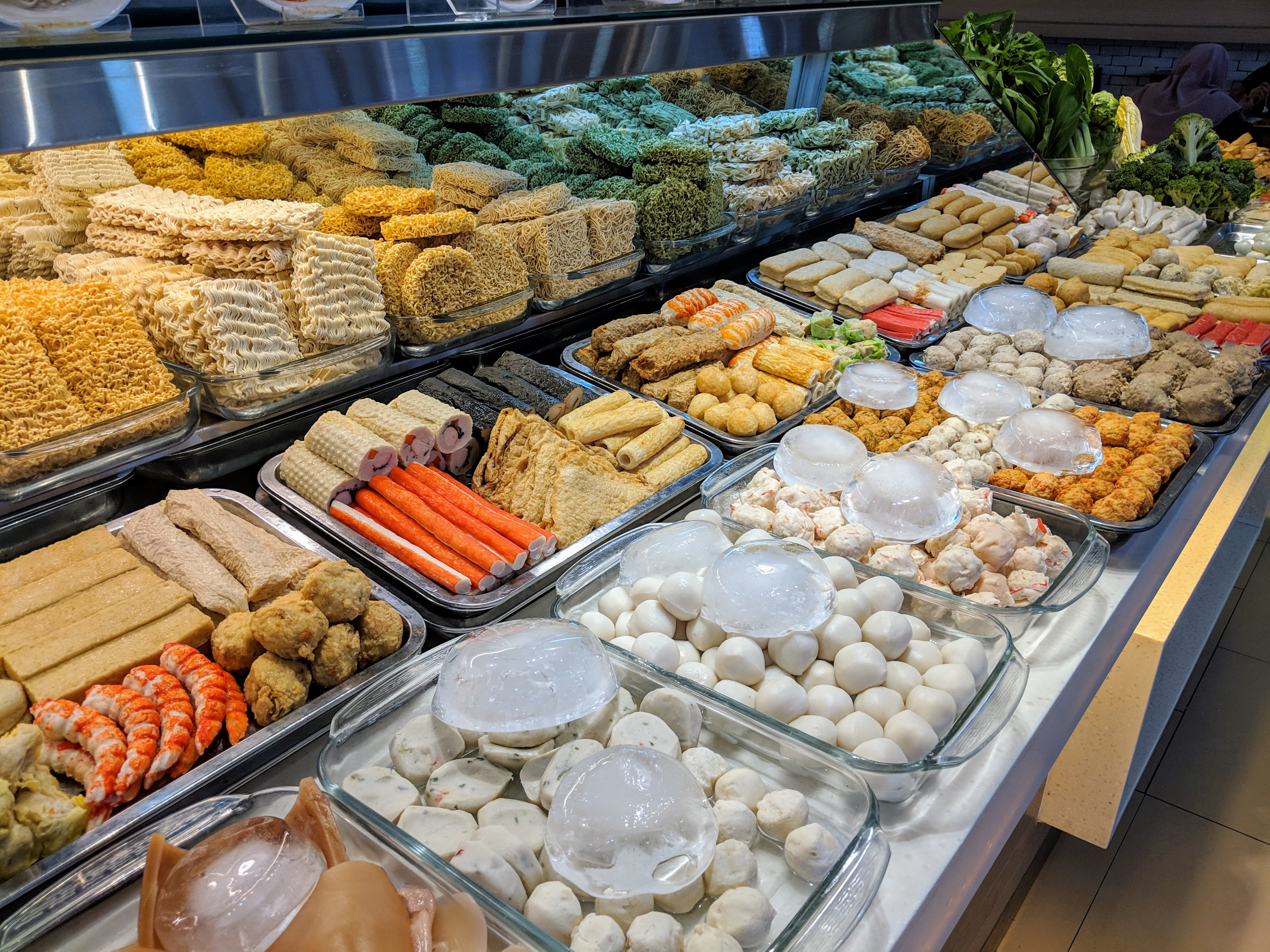
A "buffet" selection of ingredients for yong tau foo in Malaysia

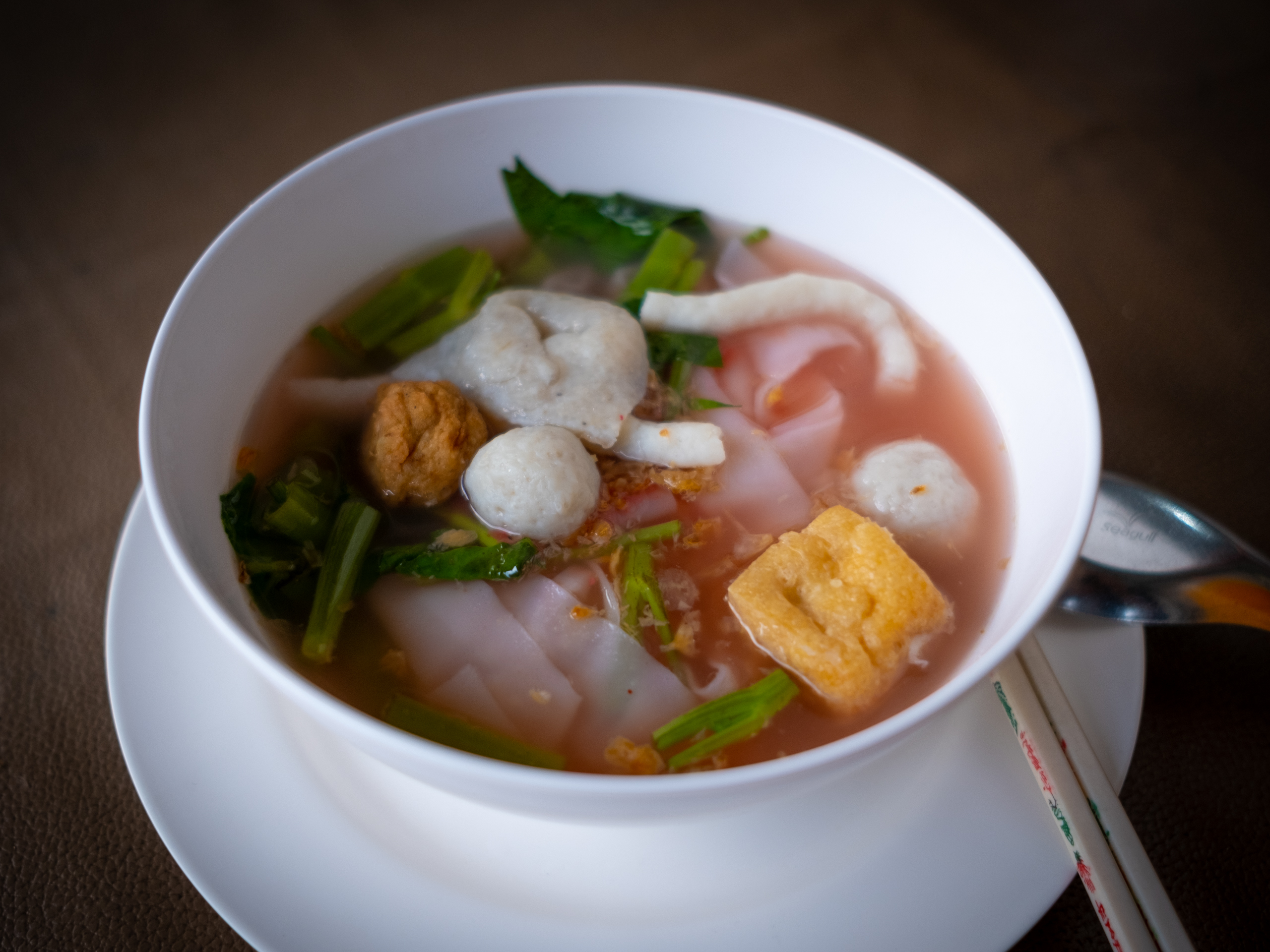
A bowl of Thai yentafo

== See also ==
- List of Chinese soups
- List of soups
- List of tofu dishes
