= Sumedang =

- Town
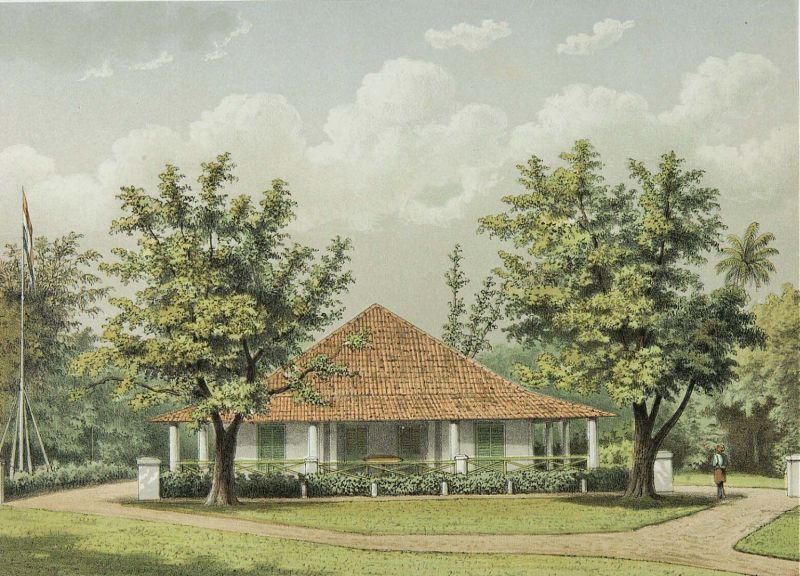
- Nickname: Sumedang Larang
- Motto: Sumedang Tandang Nyandang Kahayang
- Location within Indonesia Location within Java
- Coordinates: 6°51′S 107°55.8′E
- Country: Indonesia
- Province: West Java

Area
  - Total: 125.32 km^{2} (48.39 sq mi)

Population
  - Total: 184,293
  - Density: 1,470.6/km^{2} (3,808.8/sq mi)
- Time zone: UTC+7 (IWST)
- Website: sumedangkab.go.id

Sumedang (former Dutch spelling: Soemedang) is a town in Western Java, Indonesia, approximately 46 km northeast of Bandung, the provincial capital. It is the capital of Sumedang Regency. The town's two administrative districts (kecamatan) have a combined area of 125.32 km^{2} and had a population of 184,293 as of mid-2025. The town is just south of the volcanic Mount Tampomas, which is 1,684 m (5,525 ft) high and is usually climbed from Cimalaka District, 7 km from Sumedang.

Sumedang's museum, Prabu Geusan Ulun, houses a collection of traditional Sundanese weaponry, as well as some crown jewels and other finery. It is on Geusan Ulun Road.

The town is famous for Sumedang tofu, a local variety of deep-fried tofu that was first made by a Chinese immigrant, Ong Kino.

In the area surrounding the town lies Cadas Pangeran, a section of the trans-Java postal road constructed on the order of Dutch governor Willem Daendels during the first quarter of the 19th century. The section is famous due to the difficulty during the construction, which required blasting of a mountainside. Hence "cadas" which means mountain rock in Sundanese. The section was finished due to cooperation between the governor, regent Kusumadinata known as "pangeran kornel", and the people of Sumedang, although with considerable ill-feeling on the part of the regent and the people due to forced labor practice. A statue commemorating this event is erected on the section.

The town housed the exiled Indonesian national heroine (female hero) named Cut Nyak Dhien from Aceh during her old age, after she was captured during the Aceh War at the beginning of the 20th century. Her tomb is near the town.

== Administration ==
The town is administered as two separate districts (kecamatan) within Sumedang Regency. South Sumedang District (Kecamatan Sumedang Selatan is composed of fourteen villages, comprising four urban kelurahan and ten rural desa. The desa of Citengah in the southeast corner of the district has a very small population, with a density of only 57.4 people per km^{2}. North Sumedang District (Kecamatan Sumedang Utara) is composed of thirteen villages, comprising three urban kelurahan and ten rural desa. They are listed below with their areas and their populations as at the mid 2024 official estimates, together with their post codes.

Kode Wilayah	Name	Area in km^{2}	Pop'n Estimate mid 2024	Post code
32.11.18.1001	Kotakaler	1.56	12,945	45322
32.11.18.1002	Situ	2.96	17,473	45323
32.11.18.1003	Talun	0.55	6,734	45321
32.11.18.2004	Padasuka	1.72	4,817	45321
32.11.18.2005	Mulyasari	2.08	4,925	45321
32.11.18.2006	Girimukti	2.74	7,571	45321
32.11.18.2007	Mekarjaya	3.16	7,841	45321
32.11.18.2008	Margamukti	2.61	5,513	45321
32.11.18.2009	Sirnamulya	3.50	5,236	45321
32.11.18.2010	Kebonjati	1.95	4,635	45321
32.11.18.2011	Jatihurip	2.59	11,318	45321
32.11.18.2012	Jatimulya	1.60	6,956	45321
32.11.18.2013	Rancamulya	2.52	7,833	45321
Totals	North Sumedang	29.54	103,797	

Kode Wilayah	Name	Area in km^{2}	Pop'n Estimate mid 2024	Post code
32.11.17.1001	Pasanggrahan Baru	3.73	12,658	45313
32.11.17.1002	Kotakulon	2.86	12,647	45311
32.11.17.1003	Regol Wetan	0.84	7,688	45311
32.11.17.1004	Cipameungpeuk	3.40	6,928	45315
32.11.17.2005	Sukagalih	1.00	3,258	45311
32.11.17.2006	Baginda	2.66	4,754	45311
32.11.17.2007	Cipancar	3.56	3,033	45311
32.11.17.2008	Citengah	30.30	1,739	45311
32.11.17.2009	Gunasari	6.25	6,152	45311
32.11.17.2010	Sukajaya	6.15	7,131	45314
32.11.17.2011	Margamekar	19.79	4,480	45311
32.11.17.2012	Ciherang	5.64	5,759	45311
32.11.17.2013	Margalaksana	5.08	3,866	45311
32.11.17.2014	Mekarrahayu	4.52	3,905	45311
Totals	South Sumedang	95.78	83,998	

== Culinary ==
The Sumedang town is well known for its fried tofu called tahu sumedang, which its original name was "tahu bunkeng". Tahu Bunkeng is one of the oldest tofu stores in the city of Sumedang. The authentic "Bunkeng" tofu was first made by a Chinese immigrant by the name of Ong Kino, who came from Anxi County, Quanzhou City, Hokkian Province, China, in the early 20th century.

"Tahu Bunkeng" outlet is located in Sumedang's city centre on Jalan 11 April No. 53, Tegalkalong. There are several branches in the city on Jalan M. Abdurahman No. 50, Jalan M. Abdurahnam No. 155, and Jalan Prabu Gajah Agung.
