= Tahu sumedang =

Indonesian fried tofu

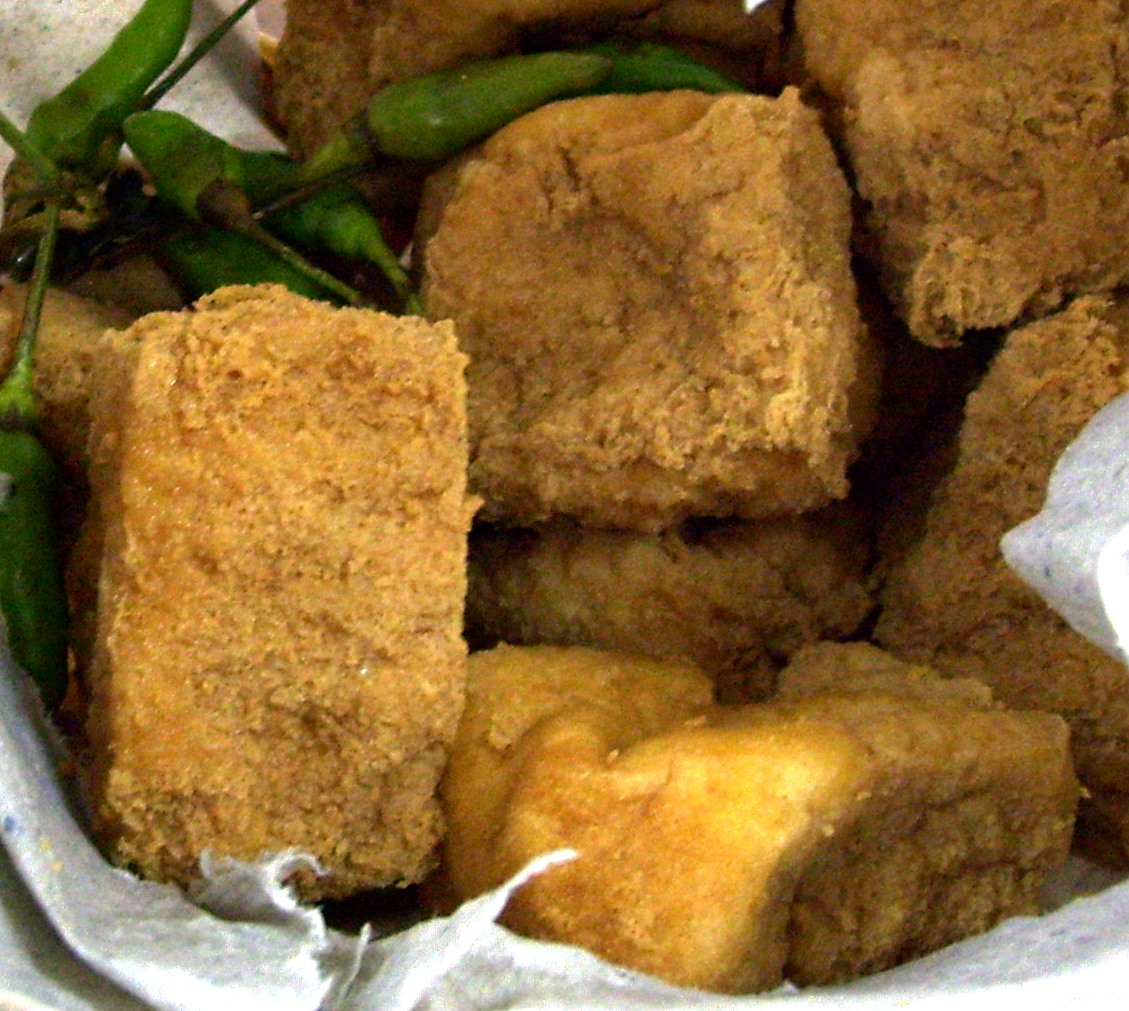
- Alternative names: Tahu bunkeng
- Place of origin: Indonesia
- Region or state: Sumedang Regency, West Java
- Main ingredients: Deep-fried tofu

Tahu sumedang or Tahu bunkeng (Sumedangite tofu, bunkeng tofu) is a Sundanese deep-fried tofu from Sumedang, West Java, Indonesia.

== Characteristic ==
Tahu sumedang characteristics are its content half empty or completely empty. It has a creamier inside than the normal white tofu. The taste is savory. It can be served with lontong, various kinds of sambal, soy sauce or cabe rawit. Eko Hendrawan Sofyan of Kompas said that the size of tahu sumedang is about 2.5–3 cm x 3 cm and that it is light brown, mottled shell, crunchy, and tasty.

== See also ==
- Tahu goreng
- List of tofu dishes
- List of deep fried foods

== Bibliography ==
- Gunawan, Iwan; Khairunnisa, Anita (2010). Yuniawati, Reny; Koswara, Rani Andriani (eds.). Sentra Bisnis Jawa Barat: Panduan Wisata Belanja & Kuliner Khas Jawa Barat. Jakarta: TransMedia. ISBN 978-979-799-150-0.
- Oey, Eric (1997). Java. Hong Kong: Periplus Editions. ISBN 978-962-593-244-6.
- Saragih, Yan Pieter; Sarwono, B. (2001). Membuat Aneka Tahu. Depok: Penebar Swadaya. ISBN 978-979-489-610-5.
- Setyautama, Sam (2008). Mihardja, Suma (ed.). Tokoh-Tokoh Etnis Tionghoa di Indonesia. Jakarta: Kepustakaan Populer Gramedia. ISBN 978-979-9101-25-9.
