= Manuk River =

River in Indonesia

Ci Manuk Sungai Cimanuk, Cimanuk, Tji Manuk, Tji Manoek, Tjimanuk, Tjimanoek
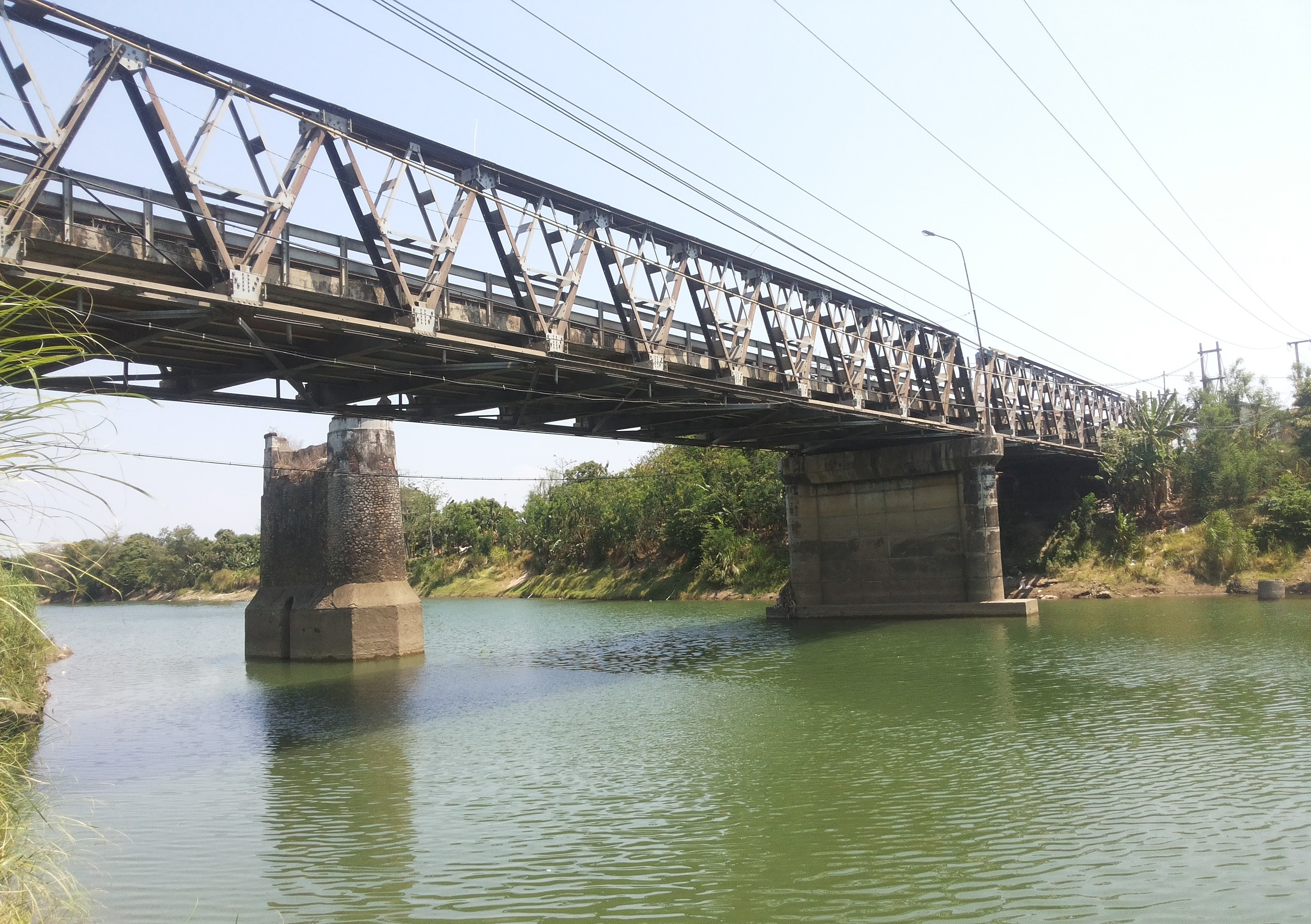

- Location of river mouth Manuk River (Indonesia)

Location
- Country: Indonesia
- Province: West Java

Physical characteristics
- Source
  - location: Garut Regency, West Java
- Mouth
  - location: Indramayu Regency, West Java
- Length: 180 km (110 mi)
- Basin size: 3,584 km^{2} (1,384 mi^{2})
- Discharge
  - location: Near mouth
  - average: 250 m^{3}/s (8,800 cu ft/s)

The Manuk River (Indonesian: Ci Manuk, means: Bird River in Sundanese) is a river in West Java, Indonesia, about 170 km east of the capital Jakarta.

== Hydrology ==
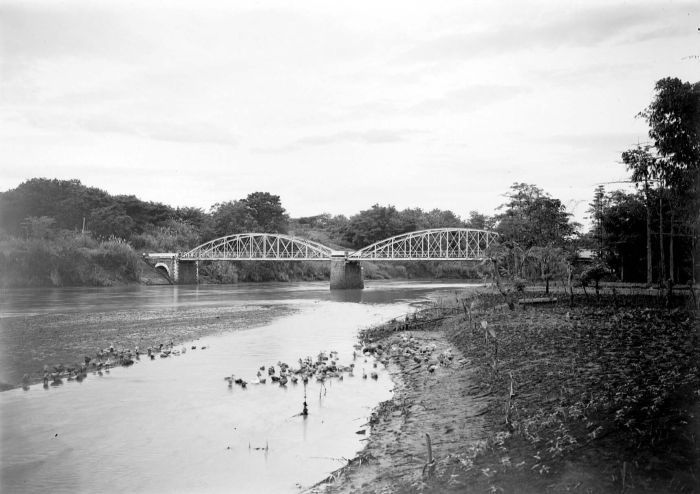
The whole part of this river is located within West Java province. The river runs from south to north and drains to the Java Sea near the town of Indramayu. There are two river mouths: Cimanuk Lawas ("Old Cimanuk"; 6.24473°S 108.34502°E) and Cimanuk Anyar ("New Cimanuk"; 6.228611°S 108.175°E).

Floods caused by the overflow of the river Cimanuk, in this Garut Regency hit on 21 September 2016, which damaged at least 7 districts. This resulted in the loss of life, injuries, and property damage.

== Geography ==
The river flows in the western area of Java with a predominantly tropical monsoon climate (designated as Am in the Köppen-Geiger climate classification). The annual average temperature in the area is 25 °C. The warmest month is October when the average temperature is around 28 °C, and the coldest is February, at 21 °C. The average annual rainfall is 2465 mm. The wettest month is January, with an average of 461 mm of rainfall, and the driest is September, with 6 mm of rainfall.

== See also ==
- List of drainage basins of Indonesia
- List of rivers of Indonesia
- List of rivers of Java
