= Luosifen =

Chinese rice noodle dish originated from Liuzhou, Guangxi

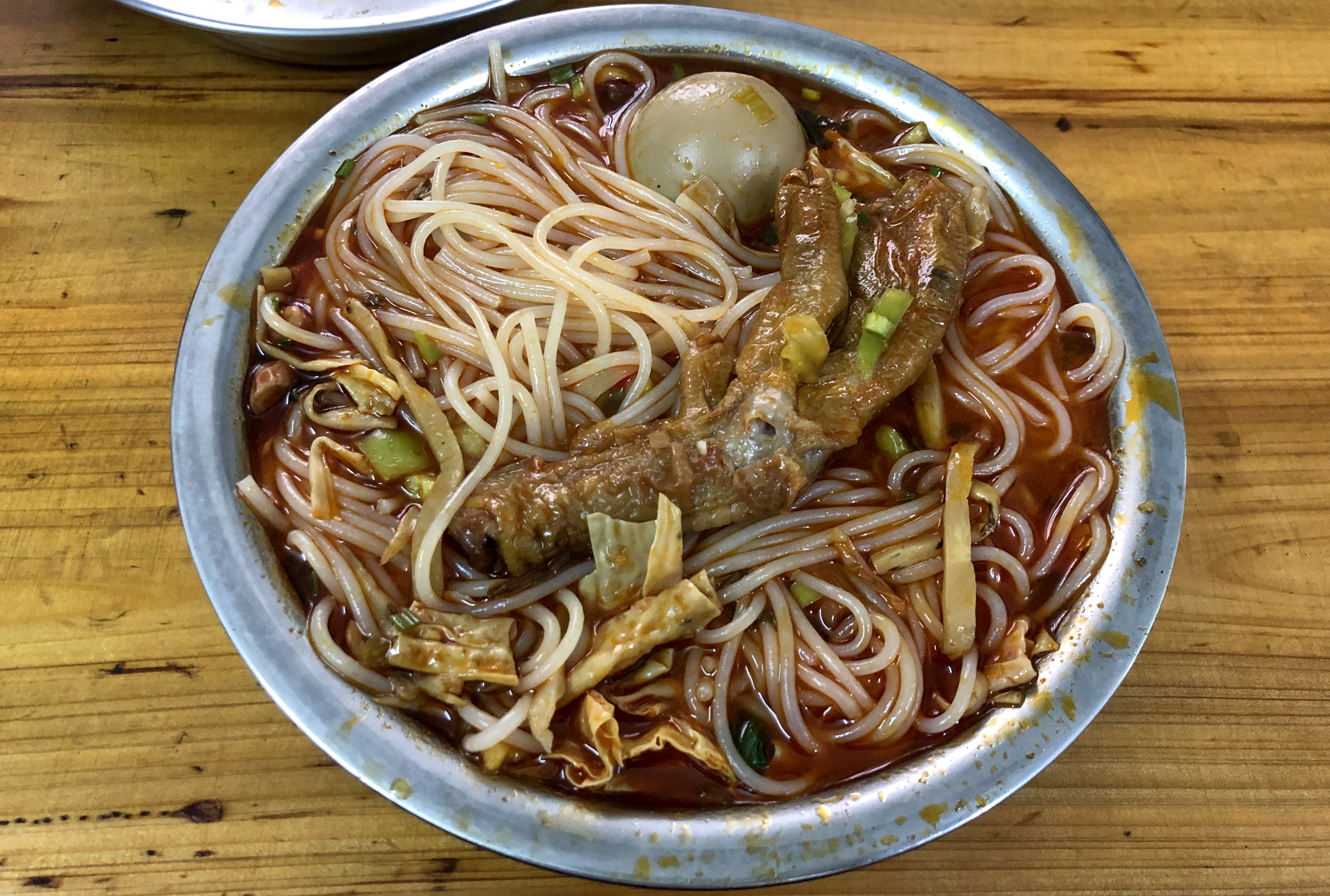
- Luosifen served with duck foot in Liuzhou, its origin
- Course: Main dishes
- Place of origin: China
- Region or state: Liuzhou, Guangxi
- Main ingredients: Rice vermicelli, stock made from river snails, pickled bamboo shoots, peanuts, tofu skins, chili pepper

Luosifen (Chinese: 螺螄粉; pinyin: luósīfěn; lit. 'Snail rice noodle') is a Chinese noodle soup and specialty of Liuzhou, Guangxi. The dish consists of rice noodles in broth with various toppings. The soup stock is made by boiling river snails and pork bones for several hours with spices such as black cardamom, fennel seed, dried tangerine peel, cassia bark, cloves, white pepper, bay leaf, licorice root, sand ginger, and star anise. It usually does not contain snail meat, but is served to taste with toppings such as pickled bamboo shoots, pickled green beans, shredded wood ear, tofu skin, fresh green vegetables, peanuts, and chili oil. Luosifen is known for its strong smell, which comes from pickled bamboo shoots.

In Liuzhou, the dish has been widely served in stands and small restaurants since the 1990s. After it was featured on a culinary documentary in 2010, many luosifen restaurants opened in Beijing, Shanghai, and Hong Kong, as well as abroad.

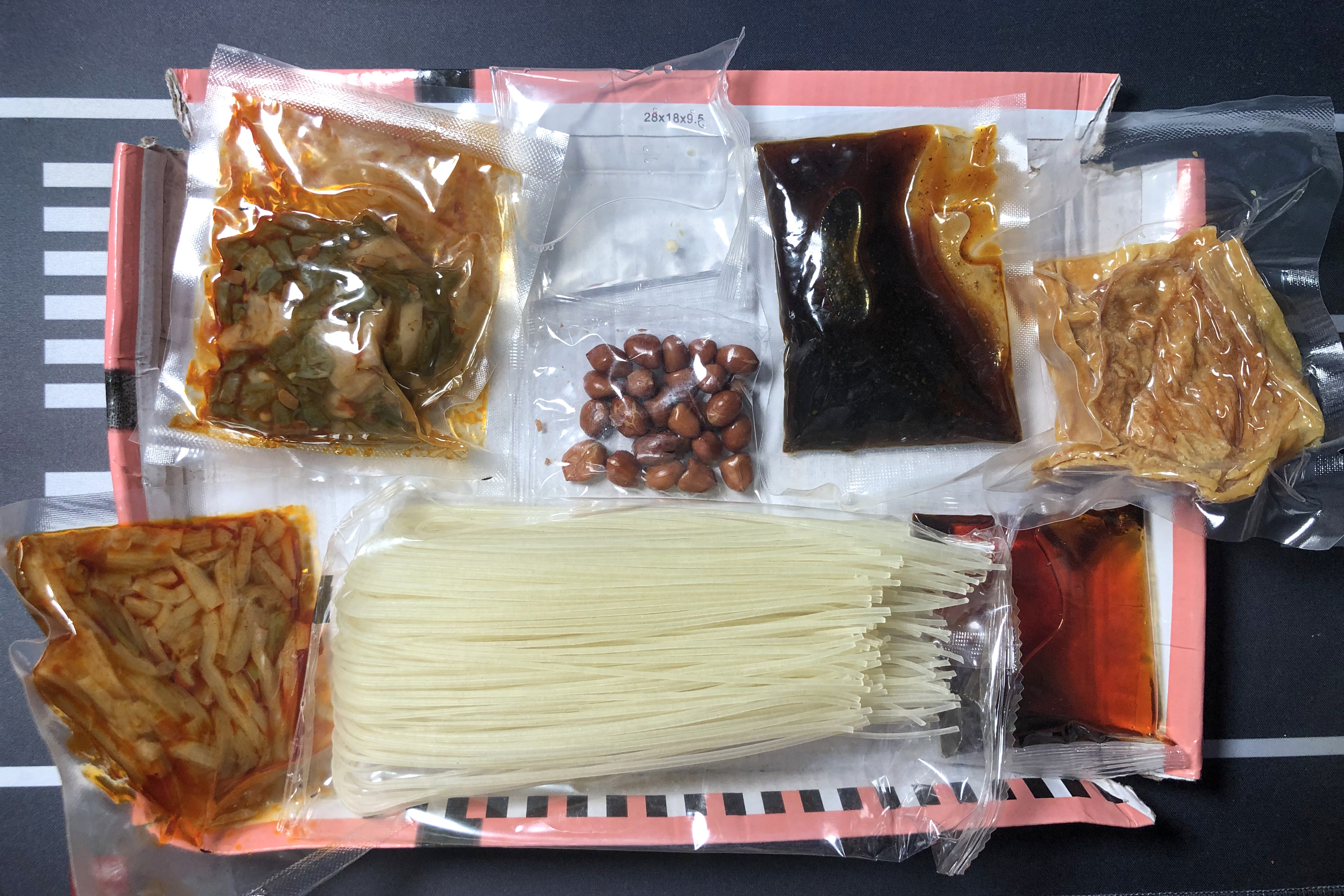
Instant luosifen

Mass production of packaged luosifen started in 2014, making it a nationwide household food. In 2019, 2.5 million packets were produced daily and yearly sales were 6 billion yuan. It became more popular during the COVID-19 pandemic.

== Dish ==
=== Broth ===
The broth is made by boiling together river snails and pork bones, for upwards of eight hours. The snail meat disintegrates during cooking and adds a mellow, sweet flavor. The spice mix varies depending on recipe, and can include black cardamom, fennel seeds, dried tangerine peel, cassia bark, white pepper, bay leaf, licorice root, sand ginger, star anise, and Sichuan pepper. Besides pork bones, beef and chicken bones can also be used.

=== Toppings ===
Some common luosifen toppings are pickled bamboo shoots, fried tofu skin, fried peanuts, and wood ear fungus. Other possible toppings include pickled string beans, preserved cabbage, fried chickpeas, turnips, day lily, chili peppers, lemon vinegar, leafy greens, snail meat, seafood, and pork. In restaurants, diners often choose which toppings to include.

The characteristic smell of luosifen comes from the pickled bamboo shoots, a condiment traditionally eaten by Miao and Dong people. According to chef Zhou Wen, this is an essential aspect. "Without the bamboo shoots, the noodles will lose their soul." The bamboo shoots are fermented in salt water for one to two weeks. Aerobic and anaerobic bacteria convert the amino acids cysteine and tryptophan into aromatic compounds such as hydrogen sulfide, which smells like rotten eggs, and skatole, which can smell fecal or floral depending on concentration. There is disagreement on whether the smell is only mildly sour or pungent enough to be a bioweapon.

Some noodle stalls have head vegetables, preserved cowpeas, and shallots. Side dishes include duck feet, tofu, sausage, and marinated eggs. In the summer, stalls sell water spinach and Chinese cabbage, and, in winter, they sell lettuce, Yau Ma vegetables, mushrooms, cauliflower, and pea seedlings. Due to the limited information available, it is difficult to discern the authentic recipe. Many restaurants use tomatoes, leafy greens, diced chicken, chili oil, and chestnuts to enhance and balance the flavor. Others make it spicy by adding more peppers or chili. Some use sesame oil, red chili, jalapeños, tofu, cumin, and other spices to bring out the pungent flavor of the noodles and broth.

=== Noodles ===
The noodles can be made from older rice noodles for a chewier and firmer texture. The main ingredient of the soup is dried Liuzhou rice noodles. Unlike others, Liuzhou rice noodles are produced only with aged rice that has already lost its fat and gelatin component; this is why they are cooked al dente. They are immersed in cold water before they are added to the soup.

Prepackaged instant luosifen noodles are prepared like instant ramen. The consumer boils water and adds the prepared sauce or other vegetables that comes with the package.

Unlike other popular regional delicacies, luosifen is rarely prepared at home, and is a dish mainly consumed in shops and restaurants, and the skill in preparing the dish regarded as 'professional' due to its relative complexity.

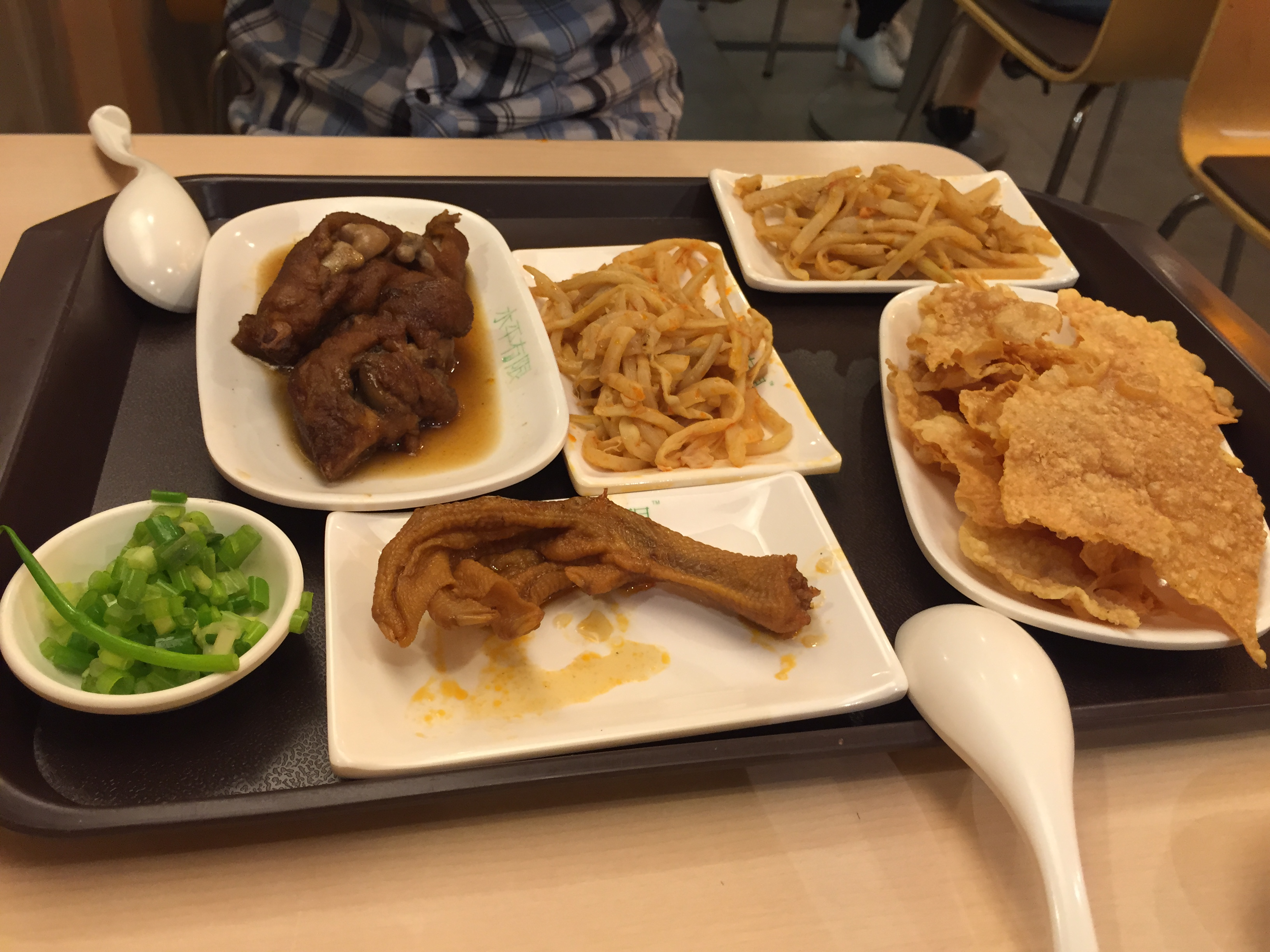
Luosifen can be topped with pig's trotters, duck feet, fermented bamboo shoots, and fried tofu skin.

== History ==
Luosifen was created in Liuzhou, Guangxi in the 1970s or 1980s. Several people claim to have been the first to combine snail soup and rice noodles, two popular dishes in Guangxi. After 1990s layoffs in auto manufacturing, a major sector of the city's economy, many former workers opened luosifen stalls and restaurants.

In 2012, the dish gained popularity from appearing in the culinary documentary A Bite of China, and Liuzhou's government sought to establish luosifen as a signature specialty of the city. It supported luosifen restaurants opening in major cities, however many quickly closed due to high costs. In 2014, small workshops in Liuzhou began producing luosifen instant noodles. The city introduced manufacturing licenses and standards as production scaled up. Simultaneously, a large number of sellers emerged on online retailer Taobao, and luosifen sales on the site increased by 3200% in 2016. Luosifen became one of the most popular regional foods on Taobao in 2019, and went viral during the COVID-19 pandemic. The city has opened a luosifen industrial park, vocational school, and tourist town. In 2020, vlogger Li Ziqi established a factory in Liuzhou to make luosifen.

== Location ==
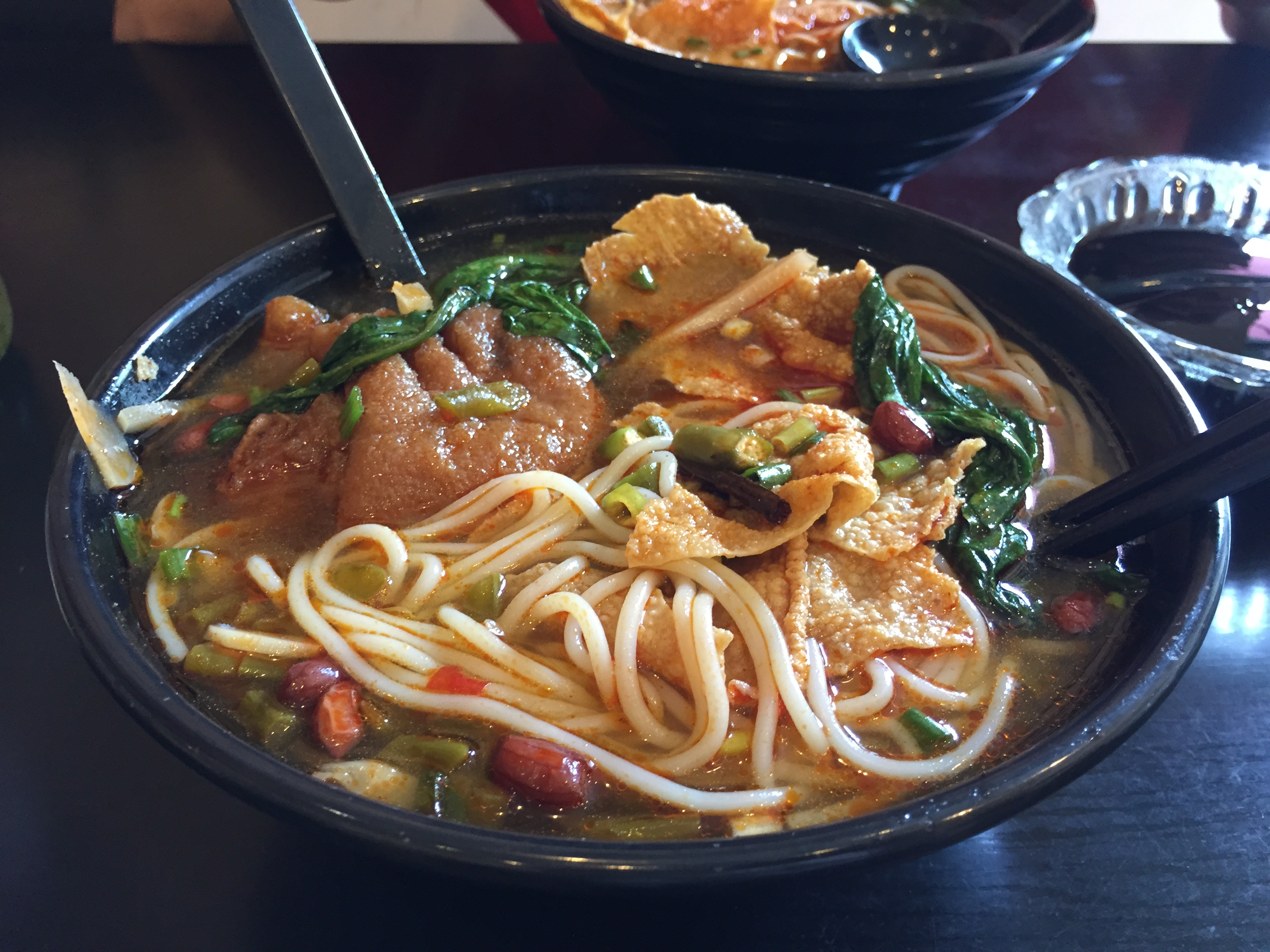
A bowl of luosifen served with pig's trotters in Beijing.

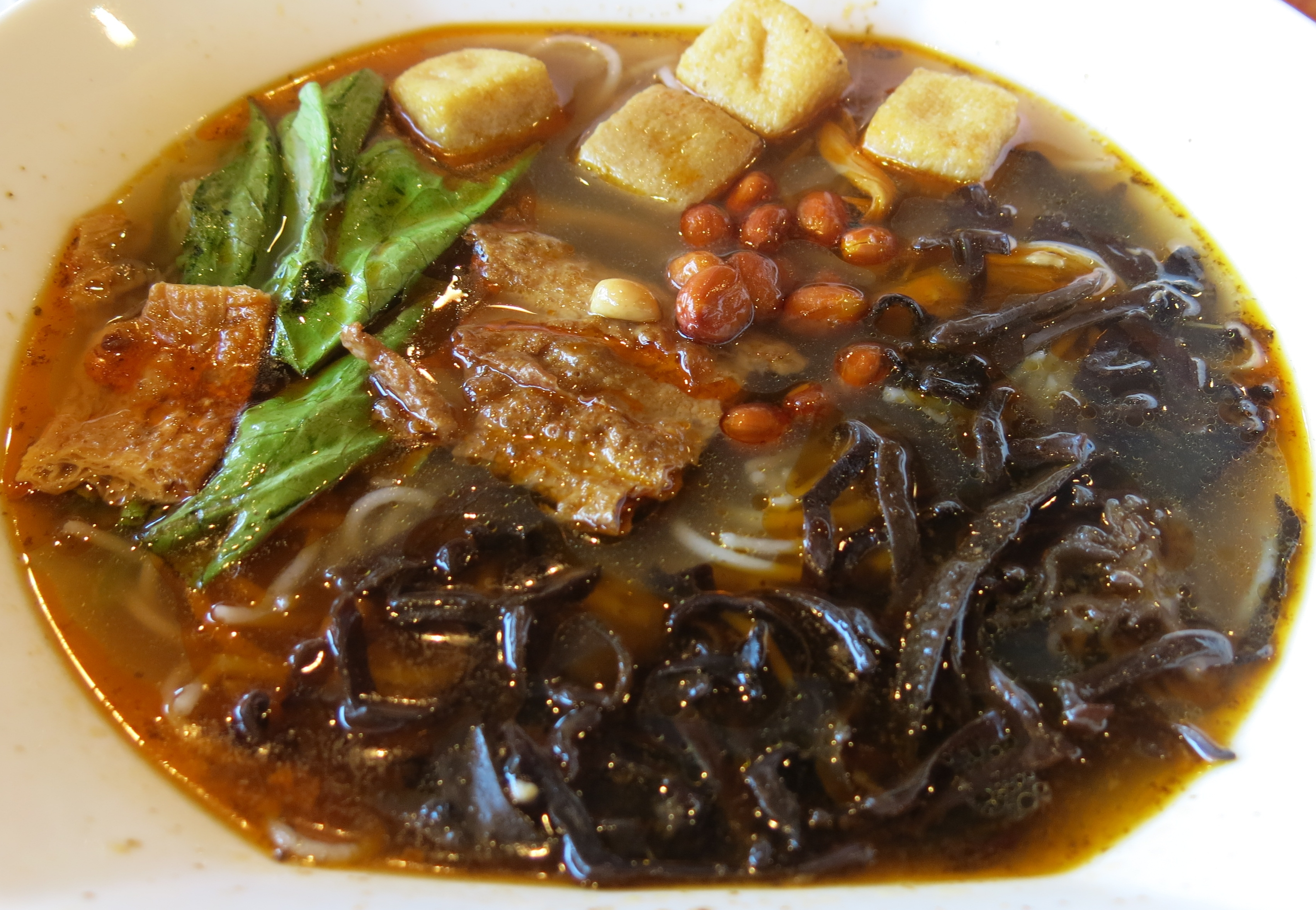
Luosifen in Oakland, California

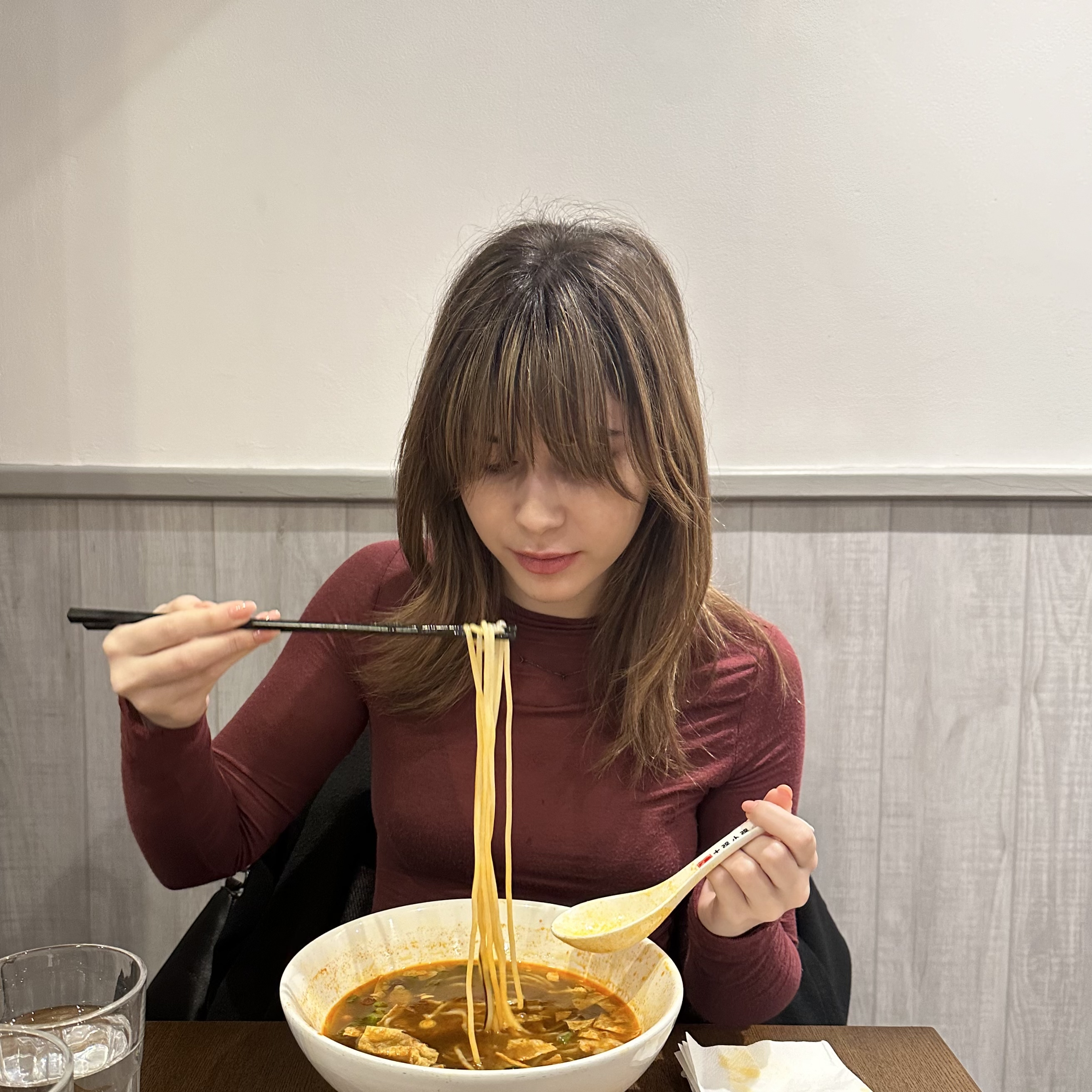
A woman eating luosifen in London. Her luosifen is served with pickled bamboo shoot, pickled green beans, fried beancurd skin, and peanuts.

In Vietnam, a variation of luosifen – Bún ốc – is served. Originating in Hanoi, Bún ốc is a snail-based noodle dish usually served with fried green banana and fried tofu. It is served as a side-dish or appetizer rather than a main course. Bún ốc can be found in nooks, street food stalls, and luxury restaurants. Traditional luosifen noodles are also sold.

Luosifen can also be found in luxury restaurants worldwide. Some were first established in Beijing, Shanghai, and Hong Kong; they have also developed overseas. As of 2020, there were over 8000 restaurants in China that specialise in the dish. Seattle is one American city that has luosifen restaurants. The dish can vary depending on the region. Most variations stay true to the base, while adding different toppings and proteins, including preserved vegetables, soy products, egg, pork knuckles, and duck feet.

Instant varieties of Luosifen are manufactured for both the international and domestic markets. On Chinese online retailer Taobao, luosifen it was one of the best-selling regional snacks in 2019. The store hosts 5,000 luosifen noodle shops and sells a daily average of 200,000 noodle packs.

Luosifen noodles can also be found in other Asian countries, for example in Chiang Mai, Thailand, where Guangxi-originating immigrants own Liuzhou cuisine restaurants.

== See also ==
- Bún ốc, a snail-based noodle dish in Vietnam
- Rice noodles
