= Tofu skin roll =

Chinese wrap dish

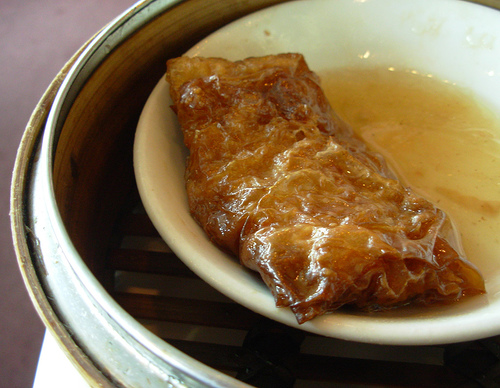
- Steamed Tofu skin roll
- Alternative names: Tofu roll
- Course: Dim Sum
- Place of origin: China
- Main ingredients: bean curd, various vegetables or meat filling

Fried version
- Traditional Chinese: 腐皮卷
- Simplified Chinese: 腐皮卷
- Literal meaning: tofu skin roll
Transcriptions
Standard Mandarin
- Hanyu Pinyin: fǔ pí juǎn
Yue: Cantonese
- Jyutping: fu6 pei4 gyun2

Steamed version
- Traditional Chinese: 鮮竹卷
- Simplified Chinese: 鲜竹卷
Transcriptions
Standard Mandarin
- Hanyu Pinyin: xiān zhú juǎn
Yue: Cantonese
- Jyutping: sin1 zuk1 gyun2

Tofu skin roll or tofu roll is a dim sum dish. It can be found in Hong Kong and among overseas Chinese restaurants. It is usually served in a small plate in twos or threes. In all cases, the outer layer is made of tofu skin.

== Variety ==
There are a number of cooking styles. Fillings include pork, vegetables, fish, and beef.

=== Fried ===
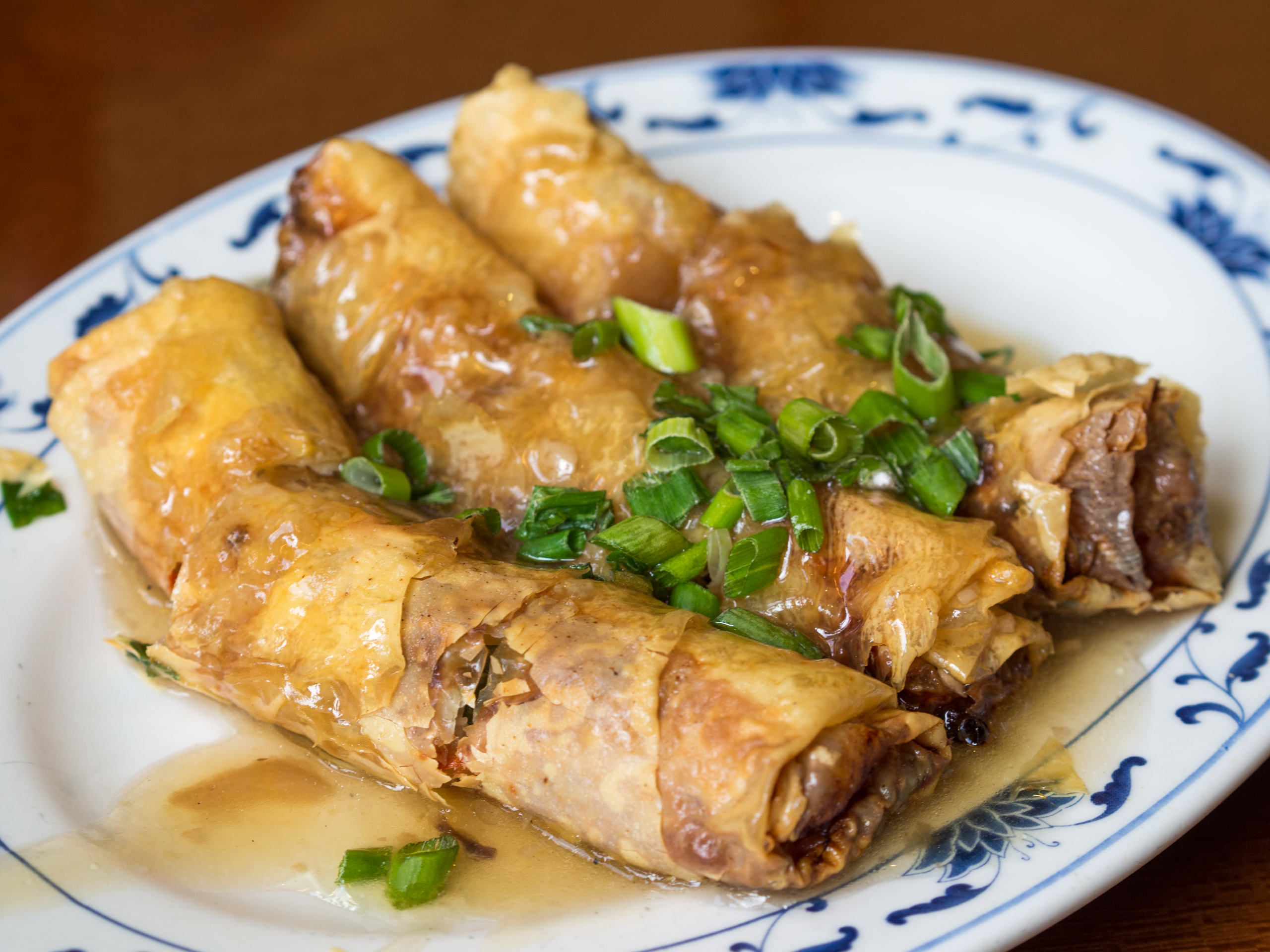
Fried version

The fried version is known as (腐皮卷, fu pei gyun). The first character "fu" comes from tofu, though a more accurate description is that the skin is made from the ingredient bean curd. Some Cantonese restaurants serve the fried crispy version at night, often with mayonnaise as dipping sauce. Another name is the (豆腐卷, tofu gyun). Some ingredients include shrimp, chicken, leeks, bamboo shoots, small carrots, tofu, scallions, sesame oil, or bean sprouts.

=== Steamed ===
The bamboo steamed version is generally known as (鮮竹卷, sin zuk gyun). It is wrapped with dried tofu skin (腐竹, fǔ zhú). During the cooking process, the tofu skin is hydrated. It makes the roll very soft and tender. This is the version most commonly served as a dim sum dish during yum cha sessions. The steamed tofu skin rolls often contain bamboo shoots.

== See also ==
- Dim Sum
- Tofu skin
