= Bún ốc =

Vietnamese soup

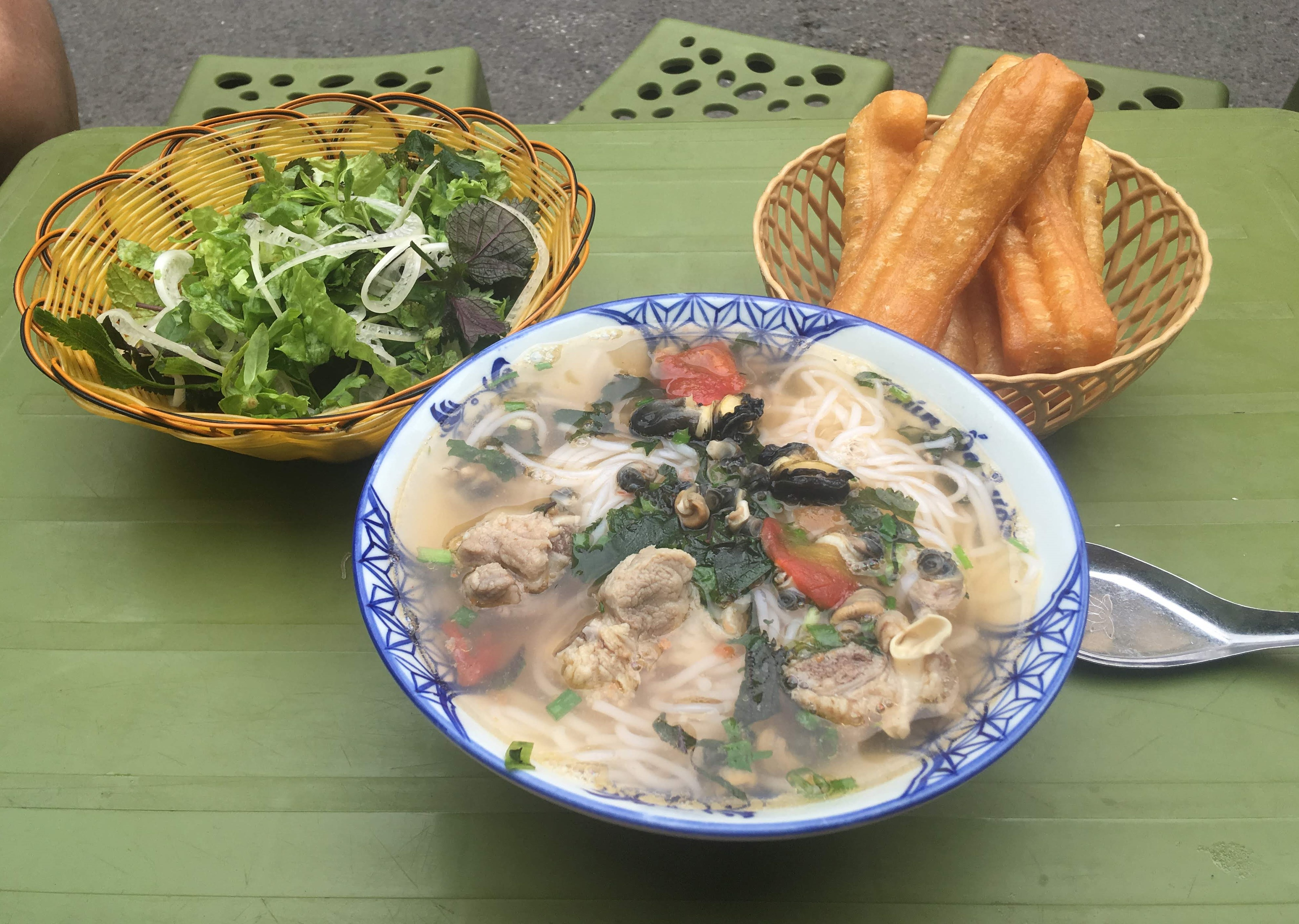
- Tomato and bún ốc topped with chopped scallions (added pork ribs)
- Type: Noodle soup
- Course: Appetizer
- Place of origin: Vietnam
- Region or state: Hanoi
- Main ingredients: Roasted snails, soup

Bún ốc ("snail vermicelli soup") is a Vietnamese dish originating from Hanoi, Vietnam. Roasted or boiled snails (ốc luộc) may be eaten first as an appetizer. Snail congee is called cháo ốc, and canh ốc chuối đậu is a thin snail soup with green banana, fried tofu and tía tô.

== Introduction ==
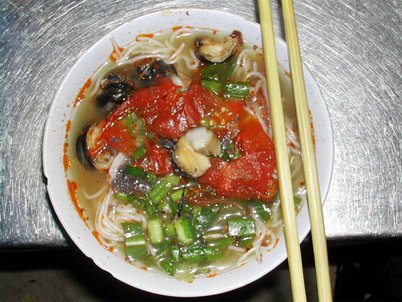
A bowl of bún ốc

Though it is not known when this dish was first created, it is certainly one of the most typical dishes of Vietnamese cuisine. It's speculated to have come from a certain countryside, then followed the footsteps of immigrants to Thang Long citadel and became a specialty there. A related dish called luosifen (snail noodles) is popular across the border in Guangxi, China.

The Hanoian often choose snails which are smaller and chewier than their land-based cousins. Fat and fresh snails are preferable, with rice noodles that were not soaked in water for too long. Cooks choose the best bun (rice noodle), which means thin and clear noodles. Bun oc not only contains broth, snails, and tofu as its basic characteristics but it can also contain green bananas, some fresh vegetables or chopped water spinach, bean sprouts, water dropwort, tomatoes, and other ingredients.

"giấm bỗng", a Vietnamese vinegar, is added for acidity and to highlight the taste, as well as a sweeter tomato broth. The ingredients are tangled white rice vermicelli noodles (similar to regular white rice vermicelli noodles but thinner) and boiled snails. Bún ốc can be served in two different ways: in its broth (called "hot snail noodles") or with broth in a separate bowl (called "cold snail noodles") with vegetables. The broth is made from stewed bones, tomatoes, and other ingredients. Cold snail noodles, which are eaten by dipping the noodles in the broth, are a popular meal during the summer.

Shrimp paste and chili are optional, although purists like Vietnamese writer Vu Bang insist on adding those for a more piquant flavor. In Mon ngon Ha Noi by Vu Bang said "It is a gift, which can be said to have achieved the goal of culinary art of Hanoians."

== Gallery ==
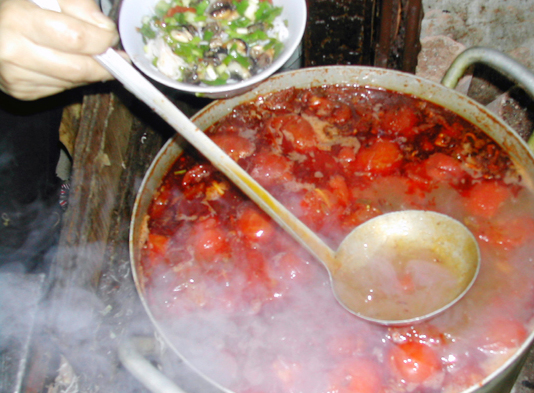
Broth of bún ốc

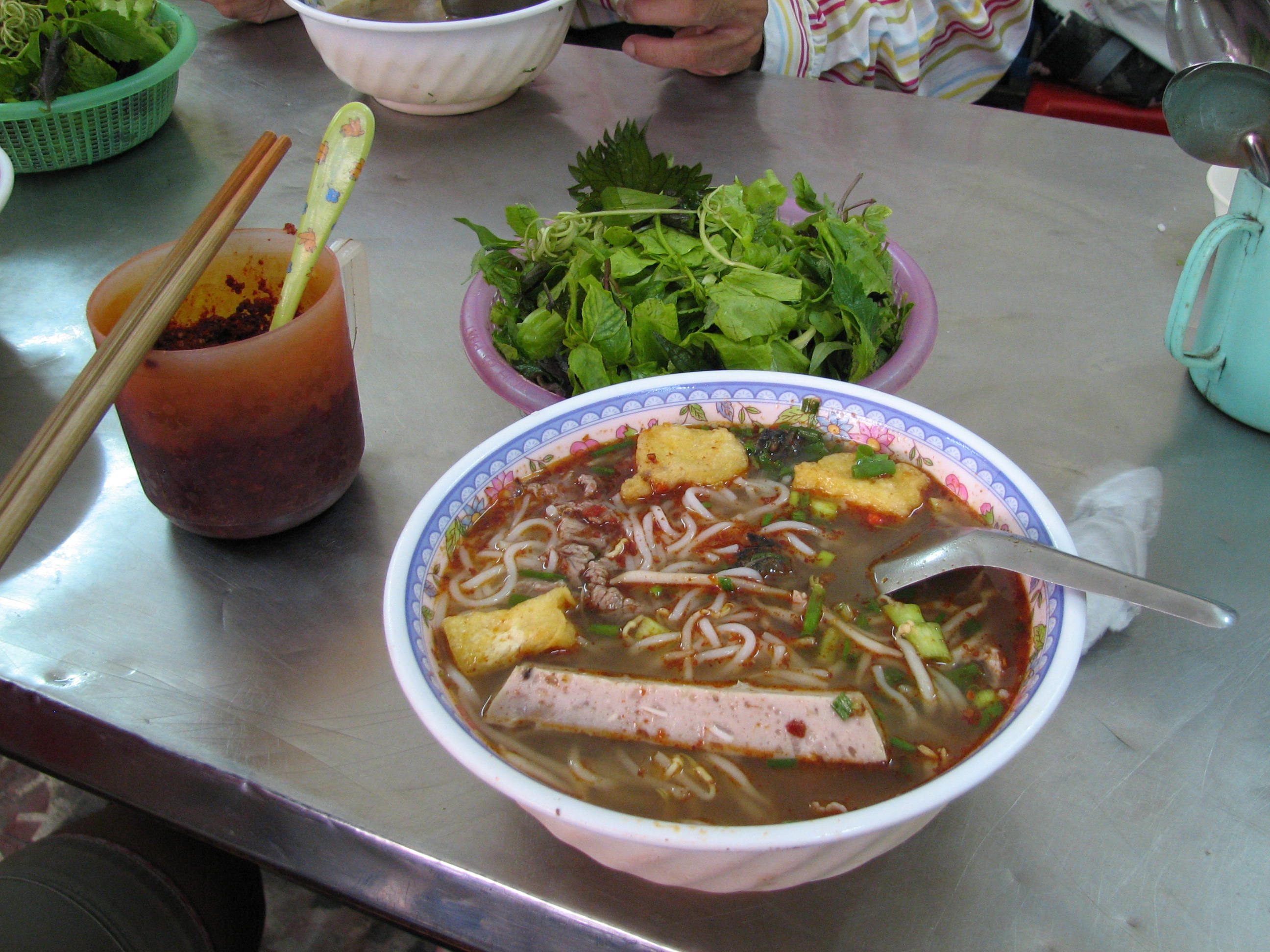
A bowl of bún ốc at a street food stall

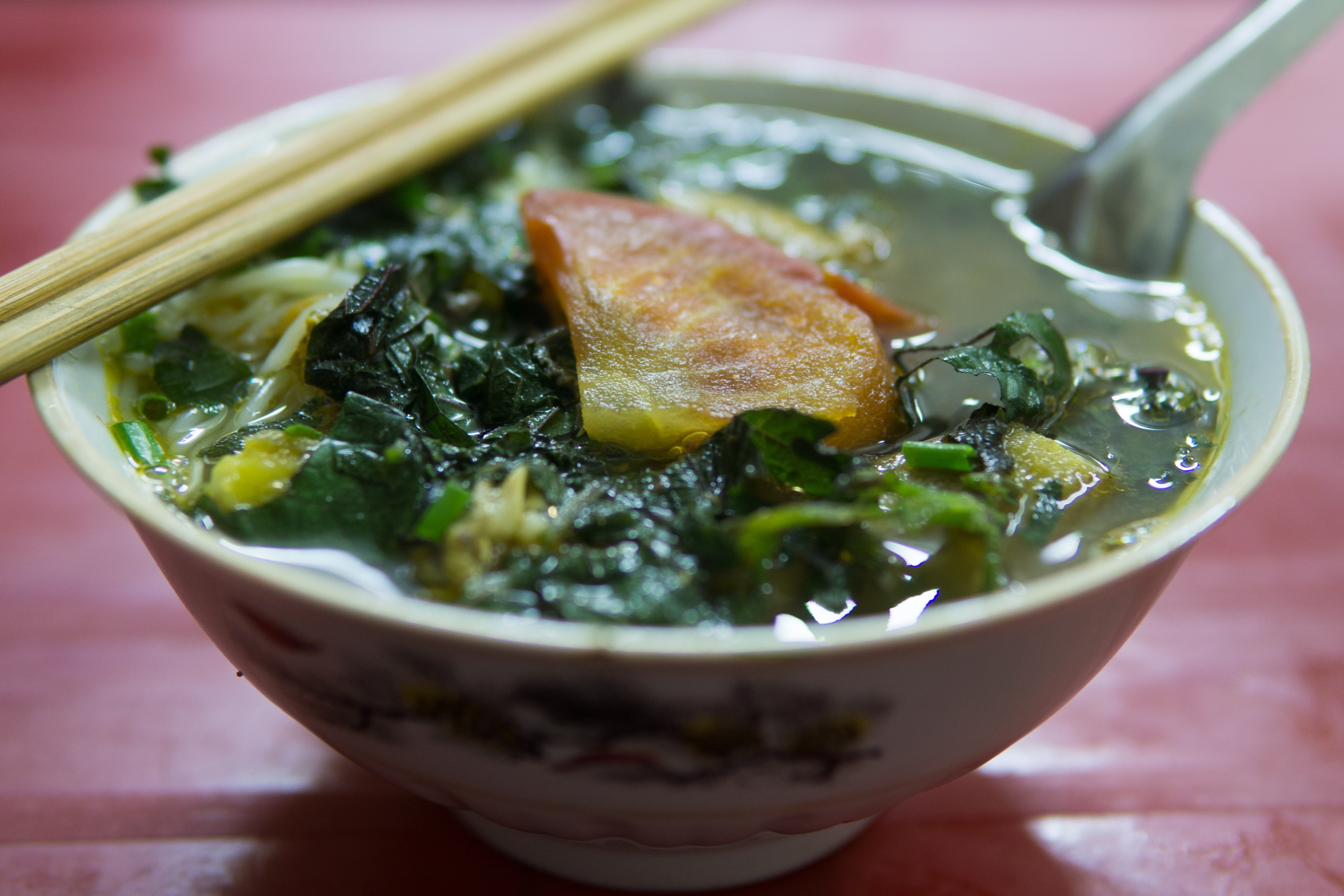
Hanoi-style bún ốc

== See also ==
- Rice noodles
