= Fuzhu (food) =

Chinese soybean product

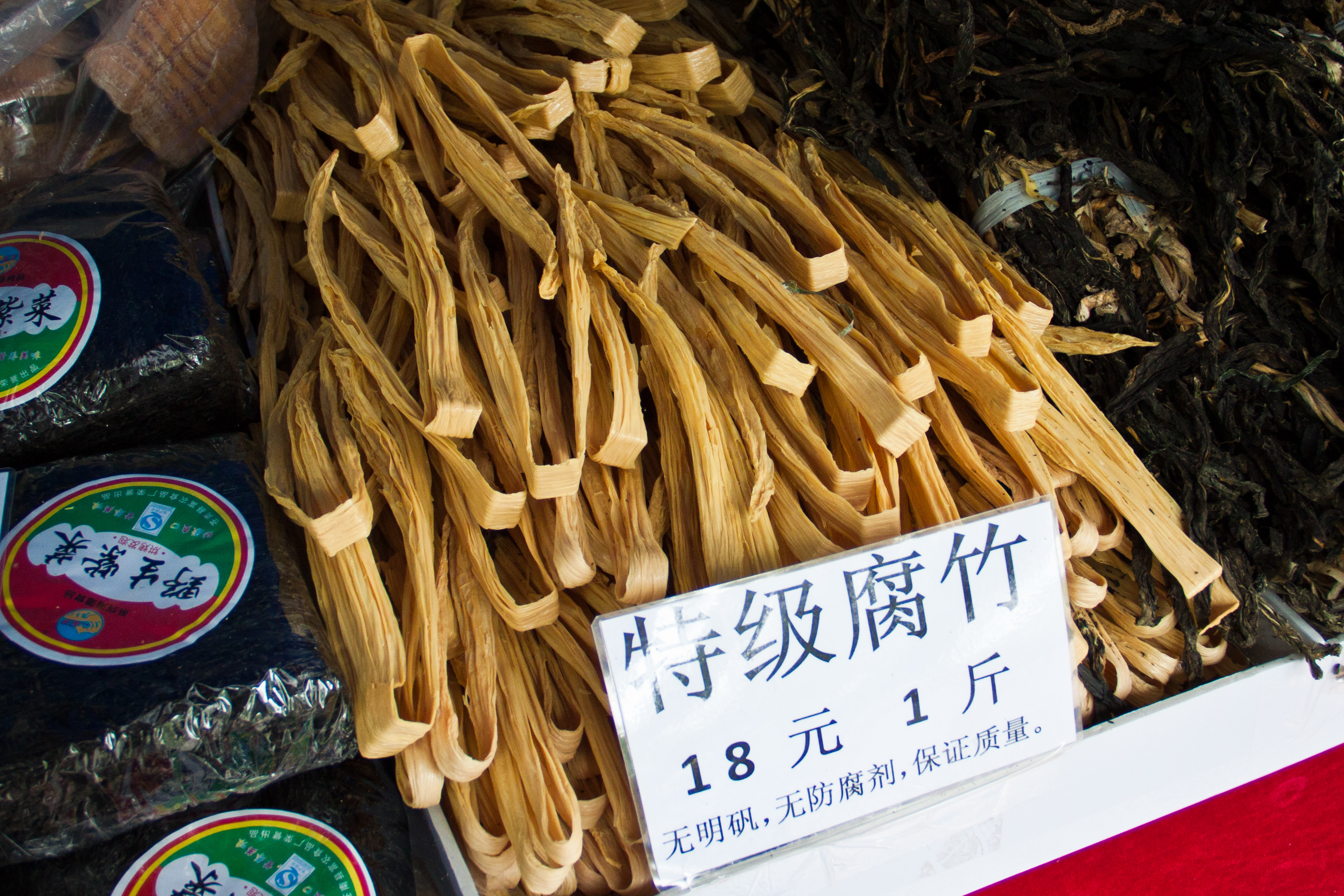
- Dried fuzhu sticks.
- Place of origin: China
- Region or state: East Asia, Southeast Asia
- Main ingredients: Soy milk
- Variations: Tofu skin (sheet form)

Fuzhu (腐竹), also known as tofu sticks, bean curd sticks, or yuba sticks, is a Chinese food product made from soybeans. It is a form of dried tofu skin, which consists of the films that form on the surface of boiling soy milk. To create fuzhu, the freshly formed soy milk skins are lifted and hung to dry, which causes them to contract and wrinkle into their characteristic stick-like shape.

It is a popular ingredient in Chinese and other East Asian cuisines, and is known for its chewy texture and ability to absorb flavors.

== Terminology ==
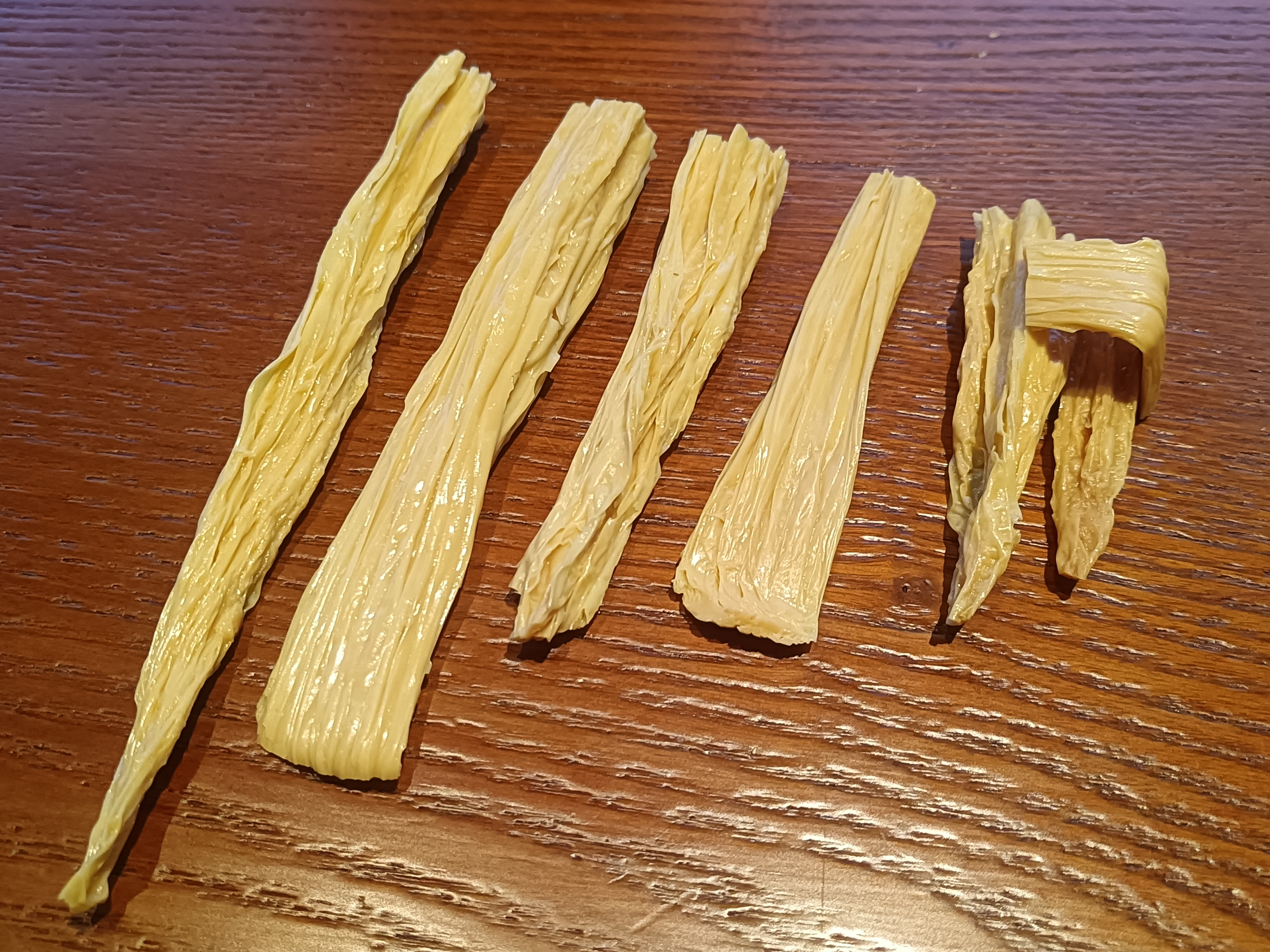
Dried fuzhu sticks

While fuzhu refers specifically to the stick-like form, the flat, undried or dried sheets are called fupi (腐皮) in China. In Japan, the general term for all forms of tofu skin, both sheets and sticks, is yuba (湯葉).

In Russia, Ukraine, and other post-Soviet states, fuzhu is widely known as soy asparagus (соевая спаржа, though it is not related to the asparagus plant.

The name fuzhu literally translates as "tofu bamboo" (or bean curd bamboo), referring to its shape after drying.

== History ==
The use of tofu skin is believed to have been first documented in China in the 16th century in the Bencao Gangmu (Compendium of Materia Medica). The text describes the process of lifting the film that forms on top of heated soy milk.

According to a folk legend, fuzhu was presented to the first emperor of China, Qin Shi Huang, as a life-extending remedy during his quest for an elixir of life.

== Production ==
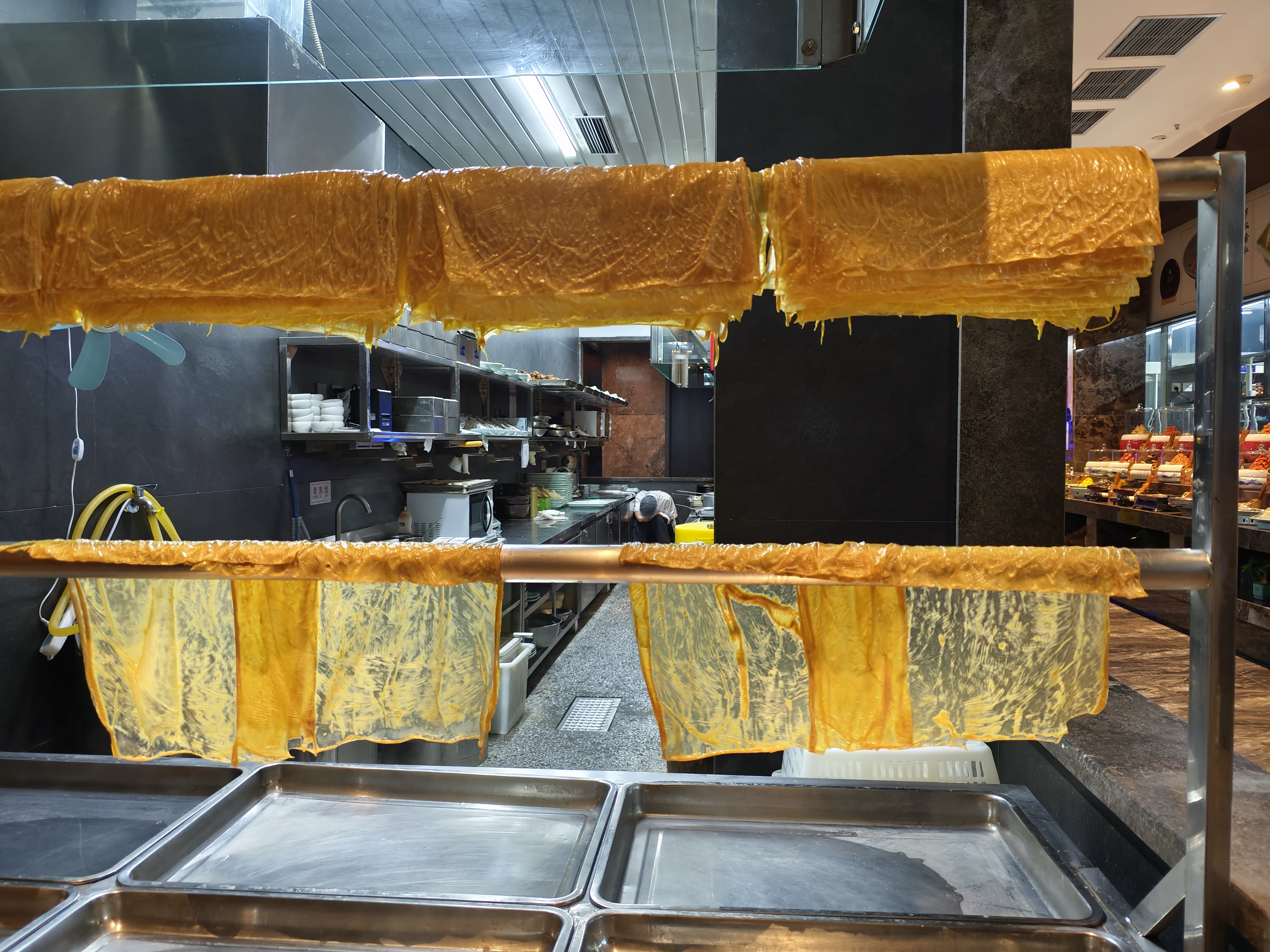
Tofu skin drying after being lifted from boiling vats of soy milk

Fuzhu production begins with boiling soy milk in a wide, open container. As the milk heats, a protein-lipid film forms on the surface. This film is lifted with a stick and hung to air-dry. As it hangs, the sheet of tofu skin wrinkles and folds onto itself, forming the elongated, stick-like shape of fuzhu. Subsequent films are collected in the same manner. The sticks are then fully dried, becoming hard and brittle.

== Culinary use ==
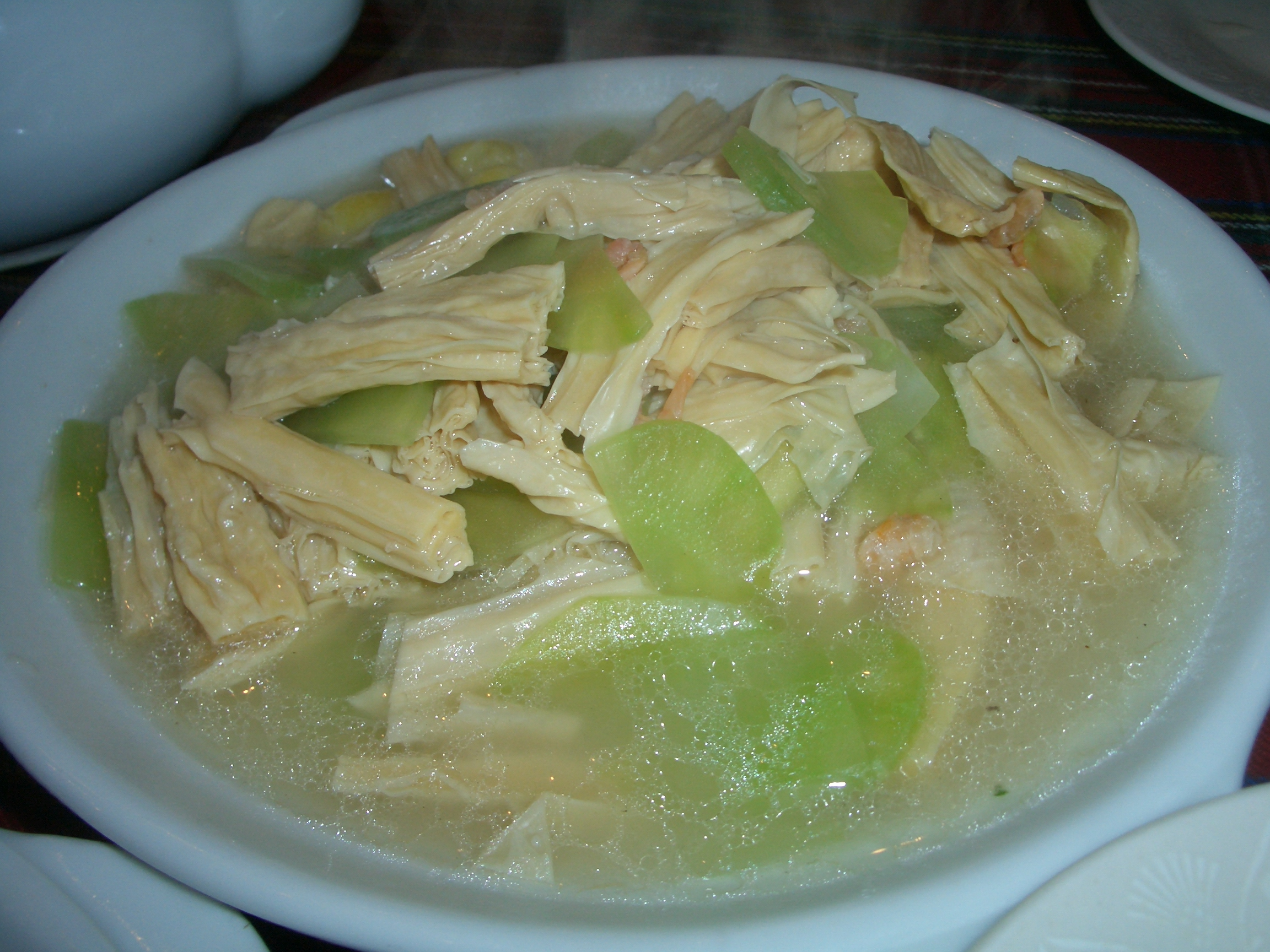
Fuzhu cooked in broth (上湯腐竹)

As fuzhu is sold in a dried state, it must be rehydrated before use. This is typically done by soaking the sticks in cold or warm water for several hours until they become pliable and chewy, but not mushy. Once rehydrated, it can be cut into segments and is prized for its ability to absorb the flavors of sauces and broths.

It is a common ingredient in Chinese cuisine, used in dishes such as:

- Stir-fries
- Braised dishes, often with meat and vegetables
- Soups and stews
- Cold appetizers, where it is often dressed in a savory sauce after being rehydrated.

Fuzhu is also widely used in Chinese Buddhist cuisine as a substitute for meat due to its satisfyingly chewy texture.

== Nutrition ==
Fuzhu is rich in plant-based protein, with some sources stating its protein content to be around 40%, approximately twice that of beef. It is also a good source of iron.

== Gallery ==
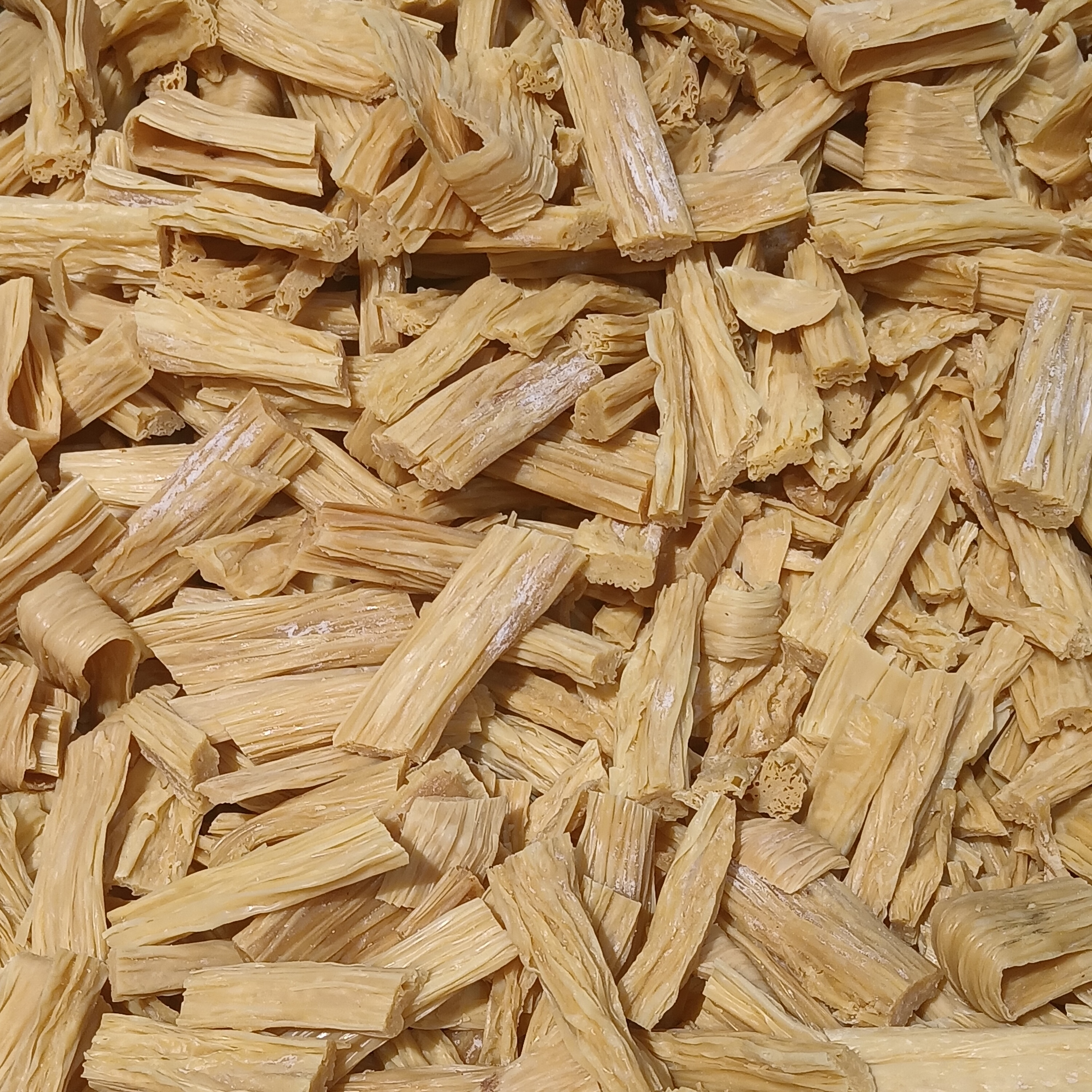
Dried sticks

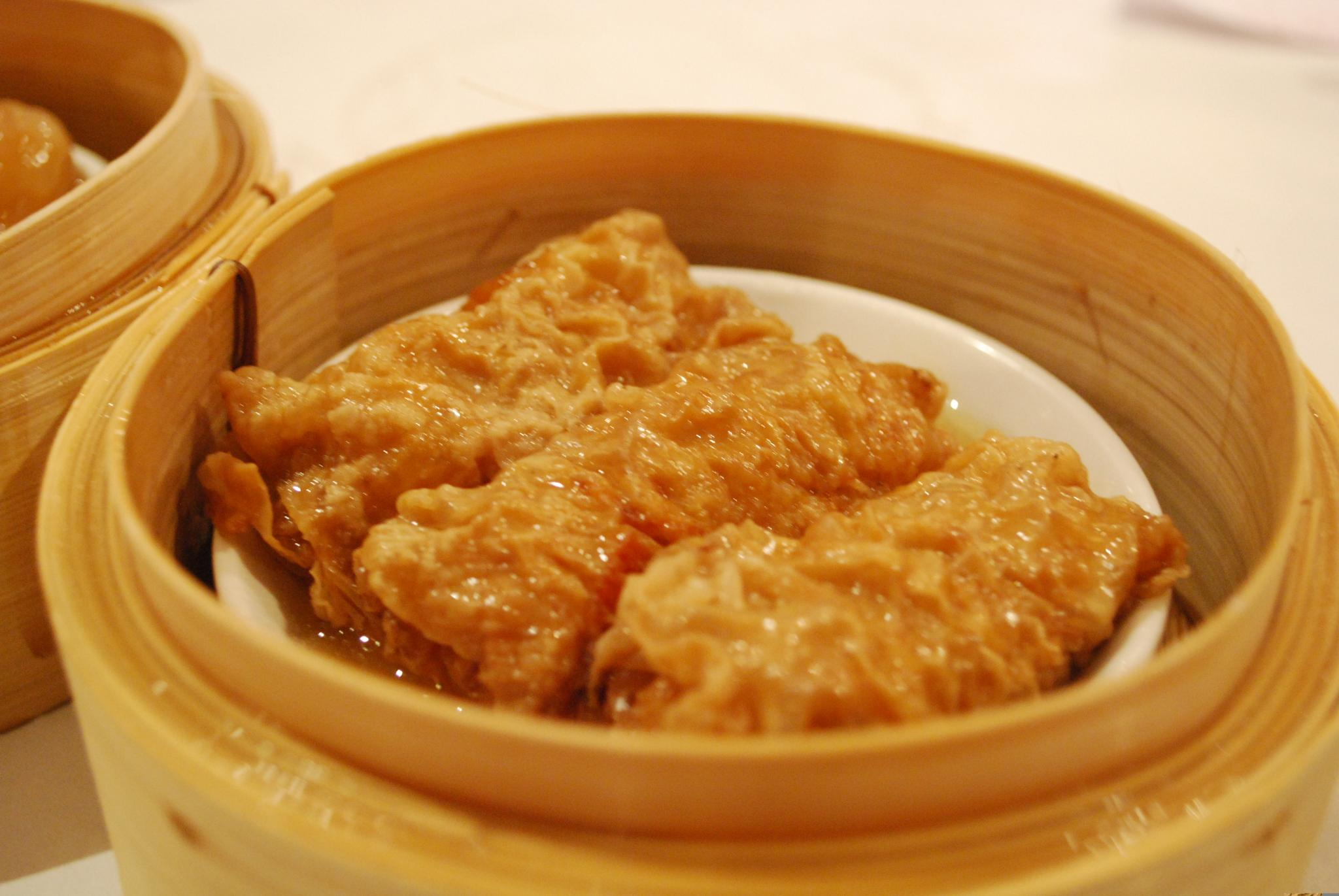
Fuzhu rolls in dim sum

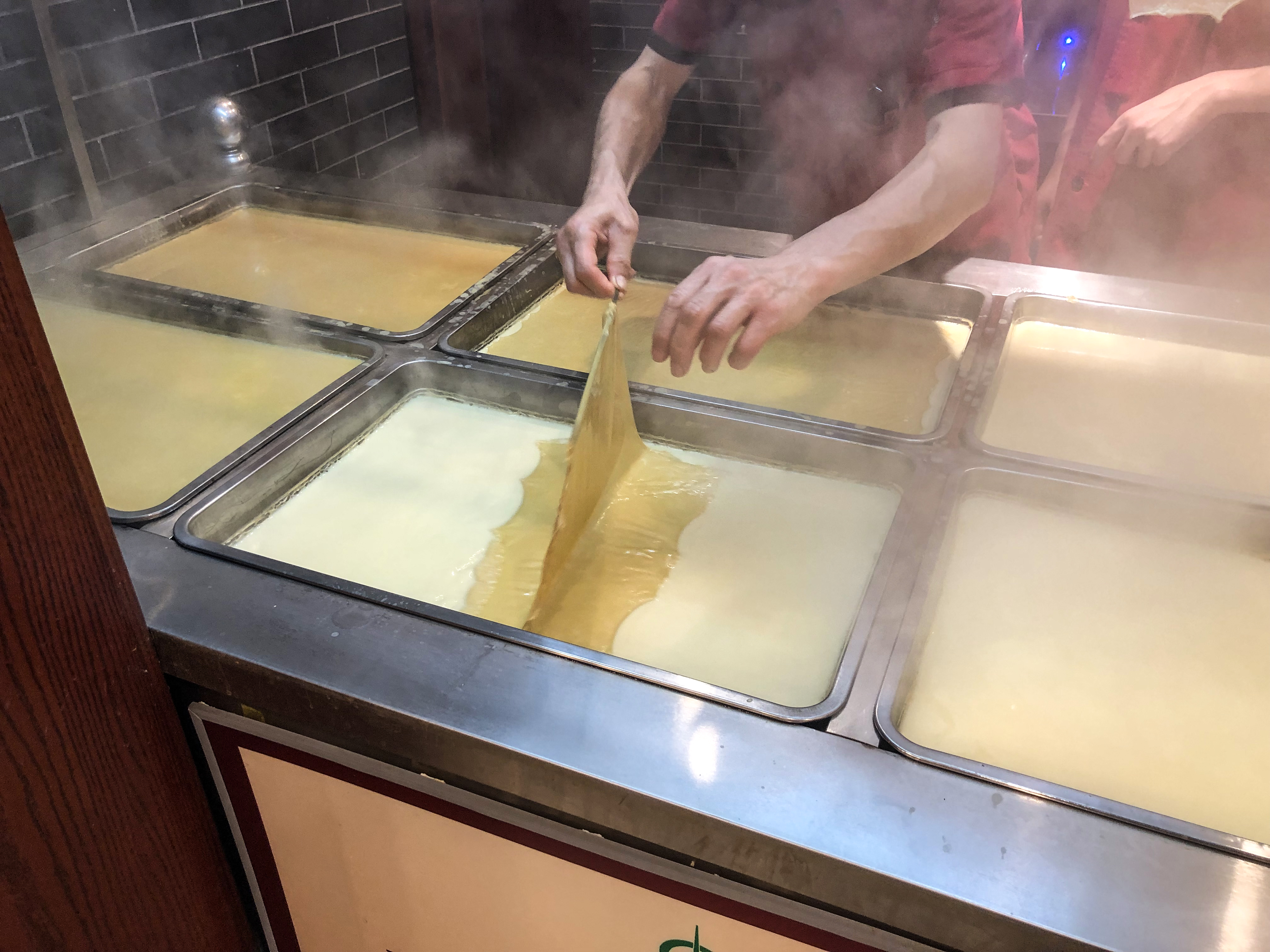
Making tofu skin fupi sheets

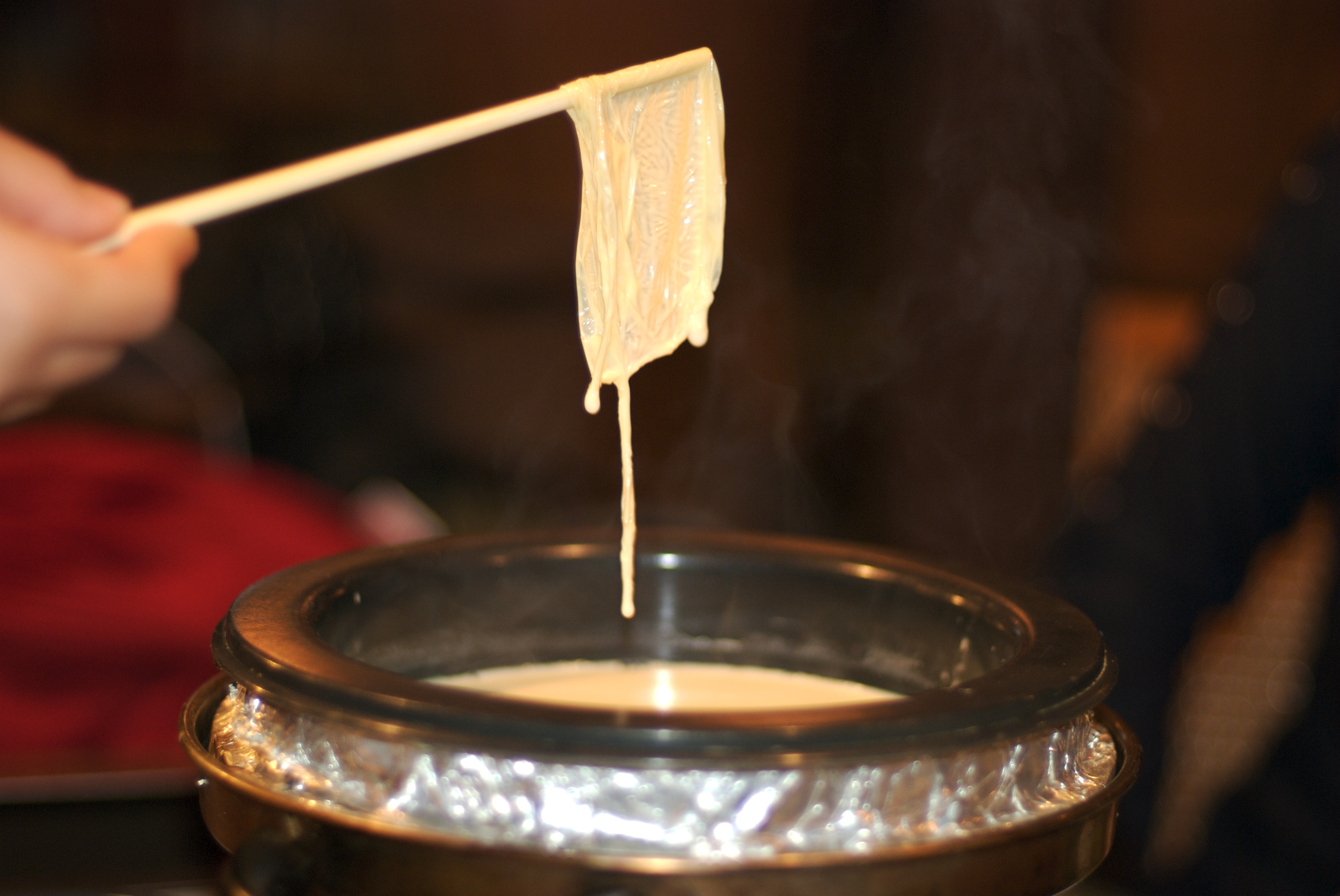
Fupi (sheets)

== See also ==
- Tofu skin
- Tofu
- Soy milk
- List of soy-based foods
