= Tofu skin =

Chinese and Japanese food made from soybeans

Dried tofu skin
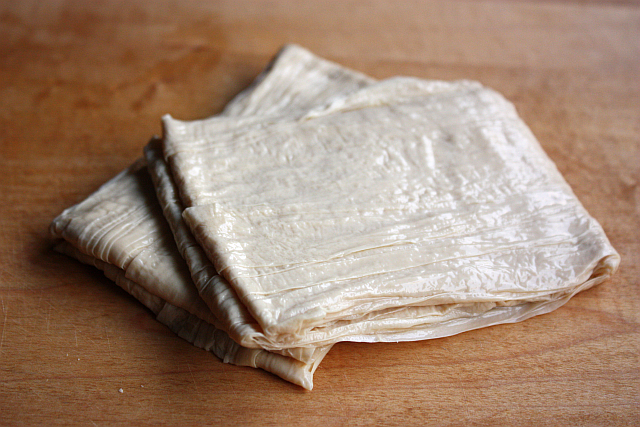

Nutritional value per 100 g (3.5 oz)
- Energy: 2,217 kJ (530 kcal)
- Carbohydrates: 7.2 g
- Dietary fiber: 3.0 g
- Fat: 32.1 g
- Saturated: 4.98 g
- Monounsaturated: 7.50 g
- Polyunsaturated: 16.26 g
- Protein: 50.4 g
Vitamins and minerals
Vitamins	Quantity %DV^{†}
Vitamin A equiv. beta-Carotene	0% 1 μg 0% 7 μg
Thiamine (B1)	29% 0.35 mg
Riboflavin (B2)	9% 0.12 mg
Niacin (B3)	9% 1.4 mg
Pantothenic acid (B5)	11% 0.55 mg
Vitamin B6	19% 0.32 mg
Folate (B9)	10% 38 μg
Vitamin E	16% 2.4 mg
Vitamin K	46% 55 μg
Minerals	Quantity %DV^{†}
Calcium	16% 210 mg
Copper	363% 3.27 mg
Iron	46% 8.3 mg
Magnesium	52% 220 mg
Phosphorus	48% 600 mg
Potassium	28% 840 mg
Selenium	13% 7 μg
Sodium	1% 12 mg
Zinc	45% 4.9 mg
- Other constituents: Quantity
- Water: 6.9 g
- Water-soluble dietary fiber: 0.6 g
- Insoluble dietary fiber: 2.4 g
- Biotin（B_{7}）: 37.3 µg
- Vitamin E showed only α-tocopherol
- ^{†}Percentages estimated using US recommendations for adults, except for potassium, which is estimated based on expert recommendation from the National Academies.

Regional names

Chinese name
- Chinese: 腐皮
- Literal meaning: beancurd skin
Transcriptions
Standard Mandarin
- Hanyu Pinyin: fǔpí
- IPA: [fù.pʰǐ]
Yue: Cantonese
- Jyutping: fu^{6} pei^{4}

Chinese name 2
- Chinese: 豆腐皮
- Literal meaning: tofu skin
Transcriptions
Standard Mandarin
- Hanyu Pinyin: dòufu pí

Second alternative Chinese name
- Chinese: 豆腐衣
Transcriptions
Standard Mandarin
- Hanyu Pinyin: dòufu yī

Korean name
- Hangul: 두부껍질
- Literal meaning: tofu skin
Transcriptions
- Revised Romanization: dubukkeopjil
- McCune–Reischauer: tubukkŏpchil

Japanese name
- Kanji: 湯葉
- Kana: ゆば
Transcriptions
- Revised Hepburn: yuba

Tofu skin, yuba, fupi, beancurd skin, beancurd sheet, or beancurd robes is a food item made from soybeans. During the boiling of soy milk, typically heated to 80–90 °C (176–194 °F), in an open shallow pan, a film or skin composed primarily of a soy protein-lipid complex forms on the liquid surface. The films are collected and dried into yellowish sheets known as tofu skin. Since tofu skin is not produced using a coagulant, it is not technically a proper tofu; however, it does have a similar texture and flavor to some tofu products.

Tofu skin's use was first documented in written records in China in the sixteenth century. It is widely used, fresh, fermented, or dried, in Chinese, Korean, and Japanese cuisine.

== Early history ==
An early written reference to tofu skin appeared in 1587 in Japan in the Matsuya Hisamatsu Chakai-ki (Three-generation Diary of the Matsuya's Family's Tea Ceremonies). The writer, Matsuya Hisamasa, states simply that tofu skin is the film that forms atop soymilk.

Other written references to tofu skin appeared around that time in China in the Bencao Gangmu pharmacopoeia by Li Shizhen. This work was completed in 1578, but not published until 1596. Chapter 25 states:

If a film should form on the surface of soymilk when it is heated in the process of making tofu, it should be lifted off and dried to give doufu pi (literally "bean curd skin") which is itself a delicious food ingredient

— First cited by H.T. Huang 2000, p. 303, 323

A third known reference to tofu skin appears in 1695 in Japan in the Ben Chao Shi Jian (Wade–Giles: Pen Chao Shih Chien [A Mirror of Food in This Dynasty, 12 volumes]. This book was written by Hitomi Hitsudai in Japan, in Chinese. When Japanese read the Chinese characters for tofu skin, doufu-lao, they pronounce them tōfu no uba. Lao or uba means "old woman" or "wet nurse".

== Preparation ==
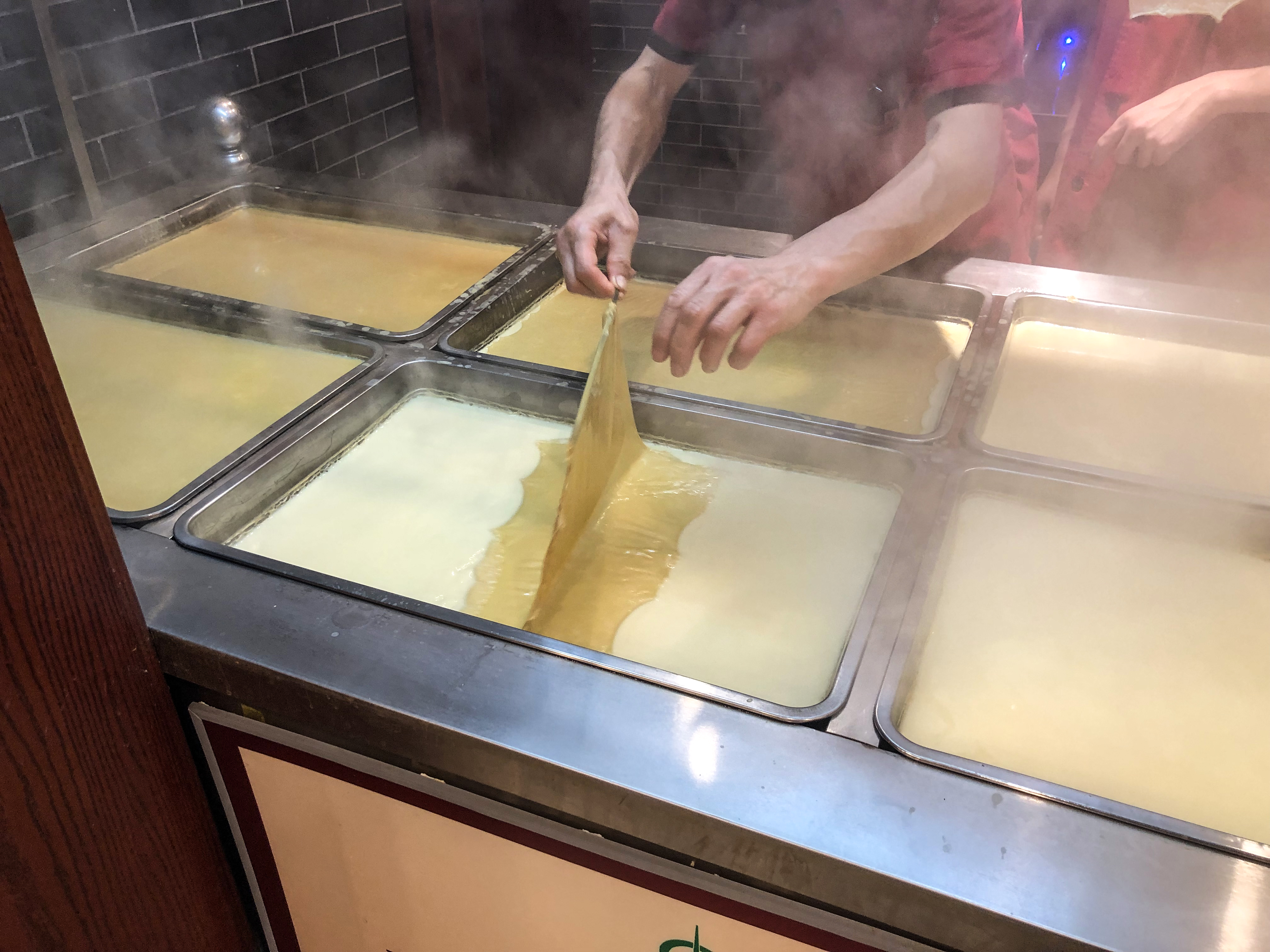
Making tofu skin by skimming the skin off hot soymilk

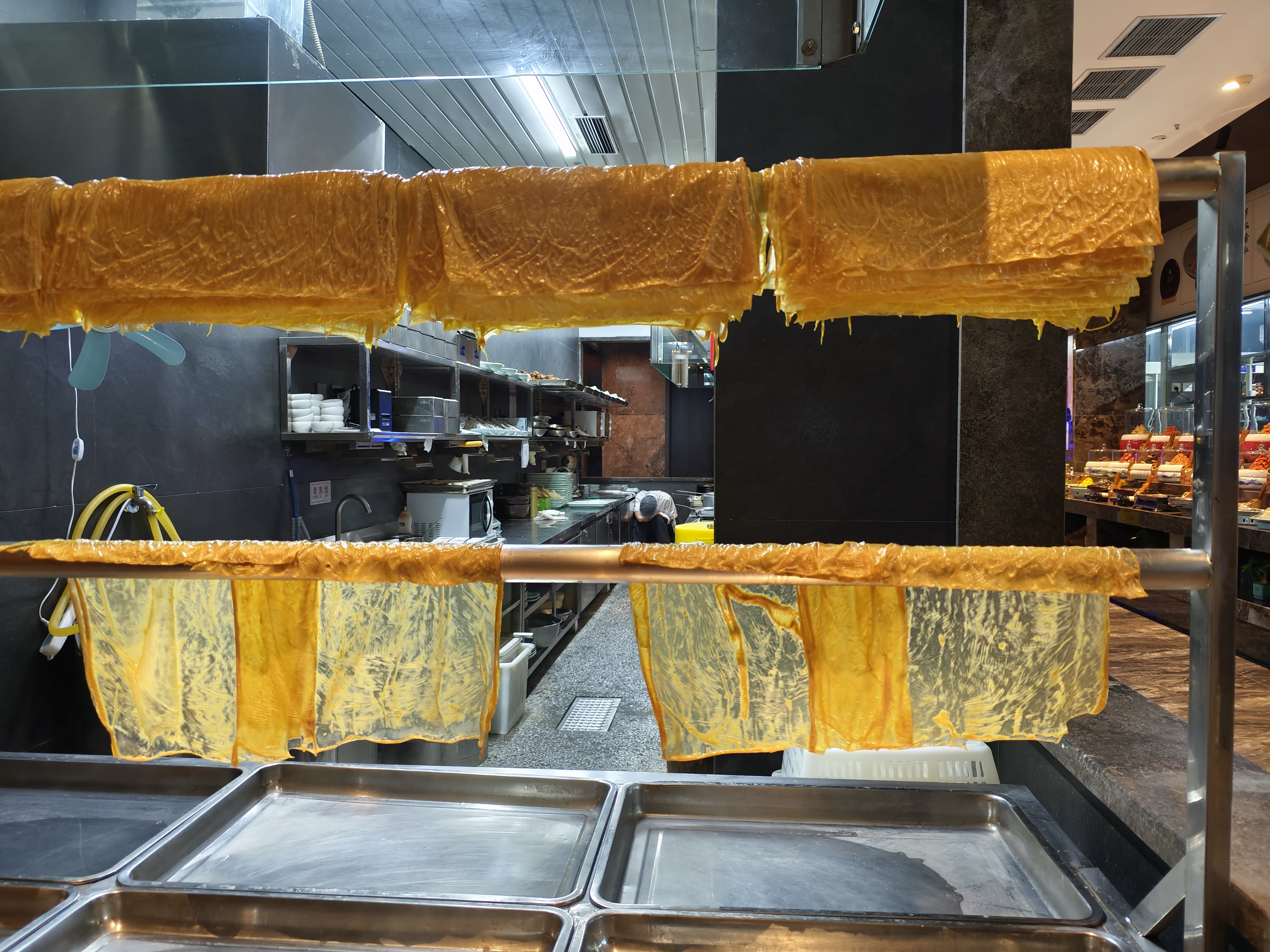
Tofu skin drying after being scooped from the surface of boiling soy milk

Tofu skin is noted for a creamy and nutty flavor, and when fresh, it has a creamy-yellow color. Because of its texture and taste, it is often used as a meat substitute. While dried tofu skin is typically rehydrated by soaking, a traditional method for preparing the thin sheets is to gently moisten them with a damp cloth before use.

Tofu skin may be purchased in fresh or dried form. In the latter case, the tofu skin is rehydrated in water before use. It is often used to wrap dim sum.

Because of its slightly rubbery texture, tofu skin is also manufactured in bunched, folded and wrapped forms, which are used as meat substitutes in vegetarian cuisine. Tofu skins can be wrapped and then folded against itself to make dòu baō (Chinese: 豆包; lit. 'tofu package'). These are often fried to form a firmer skin before being cooked further.

While in Chinese cuisine tofu skin is almost exclusively used in savory dishes, in Japan it can also be prepared as a dessert. A common point of confusion is its relation to Inarizushi; the pouches used for this type of sushi are made from thin slices of deep-fried tofu (abura-age), not from tofu skin.

=== Grading and Varieties ===
In Chinese culinary tradition, tofu skin is often graded based on when the film is lifted from the soy milk, resulting in different textures and uses. This classification is not commonly detailed outside of China.

- Fupi (腐皮): The first film to be lifted. It is considered the highest quality, with the smoothest and most delicate texture. It can be eaten fresh or dried in sheets.
- Fuzhu (腐竹): The films lifted after the initial fupi. These are hung to dry, which causes them to form into sticks. Their texture is still highly regarded but is slightly denser than fupi. The name is sometimes also written as 腐枝 (fǔzhī) or 枝竹 (zhīzhú).
- Sheets for sweet soups: Later layers are often laid flat to dry and are primarily used in desserts and sweet soups (糖水, táng shuǐ).
- Coarser sheets: Lower layers are thicker and coarser, making them suitable as wrappers for various food items.
- Tian zhu (甜竹, "sweet bamboo"): The last and coarsest layers collected from the bottom of the pan, typically used as a minor ingredient in dishes.

== Forms ==
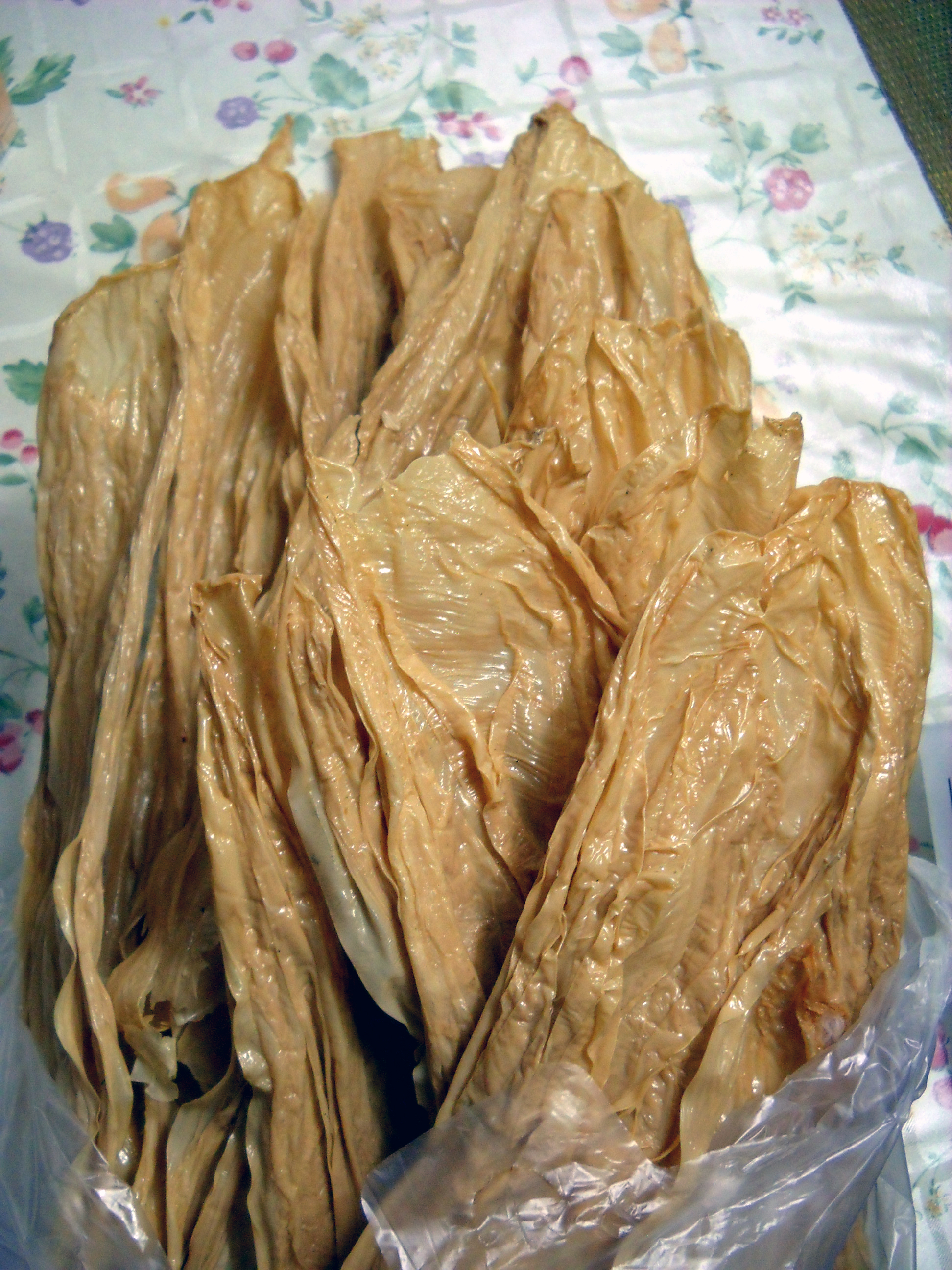
Tofu skin is commonly sold as dried leaves or sheets

These are the three basic forms. Each comes in many varieties.

=== Dried ===
Tofu skin may also be dried and sold as fuzhu (dried beancurd sticks). By layering or bunching fresh tofu skin or rehydrated tofu skin, then tying it tightly in cloth and stewing it, the dried beancurd sticks will retain their original shape. This bunched tofu skin is then called tofu chicken (simplified Chinese: 豆鸡; traditional Chinese: 豆雞; pinyin: dòu jī; or simplified Chinese: 素鸡; traditional Chinese: 素雞; pinyin: sù jī). In Thai cooking it is referred to as fawng dtâo-hûu (Thai: ฟองเต้าหู้, lit. foam tofu). It is commonly called foo chuk in Southeast Asia.

=== Meat alternatives ===
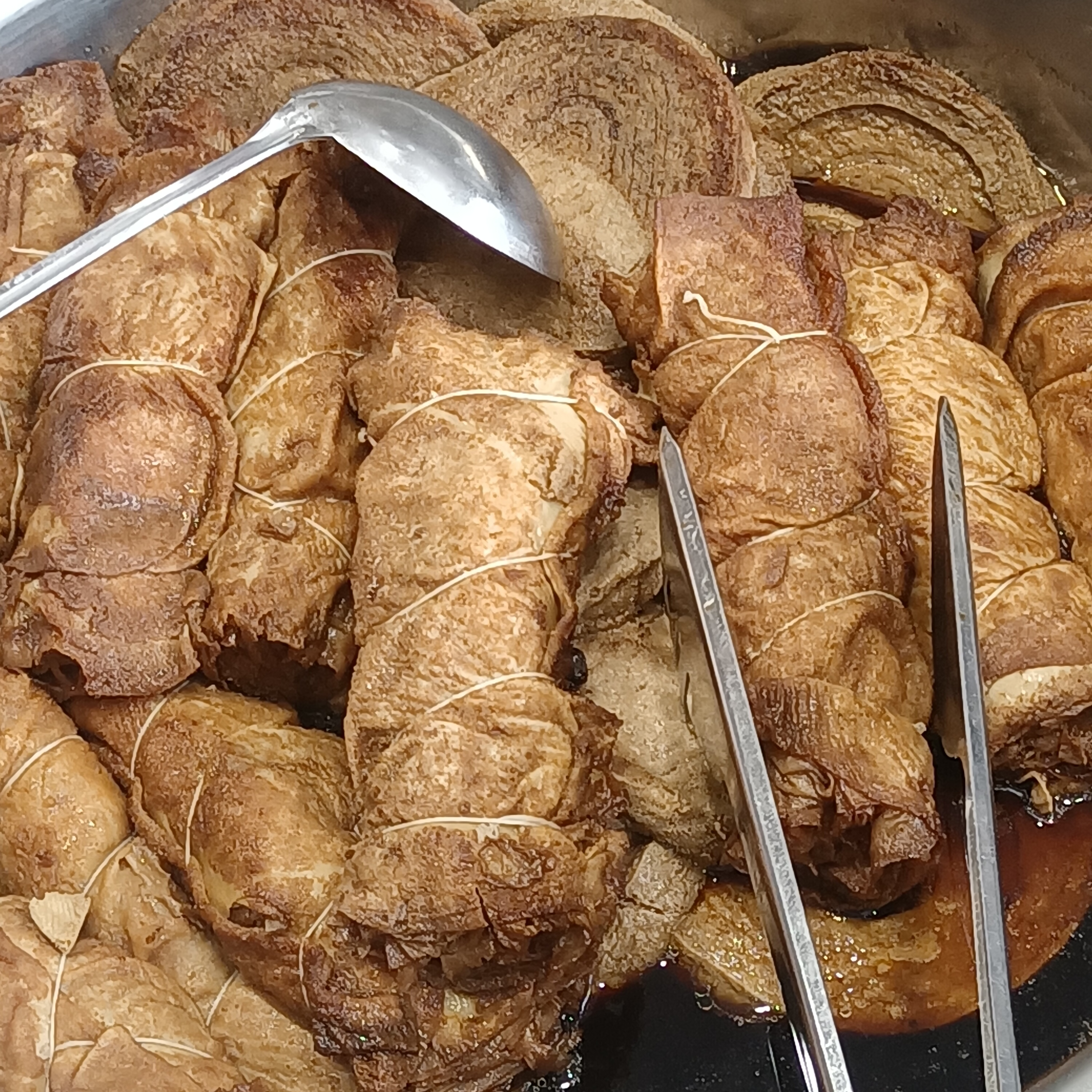
Vegetarian chicken made of rolled tofu skin

By layering and bunching the sheets, then stewing them, a wide variety of meat substitutes can be created. The most common is tofu chicken (素雞, sù jī), but by adding different seasonings and pressing it into shape, it is also made into tofu duck (素鴨, sù yā) and tofu ham (素火腿, sù huǒtuǐ). These products should not be confused with another product sometimes called "vegetarian chicken" (齋雞, zhāi jī), which is typically made from other soy-based ingredients and has a granular or ball-like shape.

The earliest process for making these meatless meats consisted of rolling thin sheets of doufupi, literally tofu skin, around a filling of minced, smoked, or other seasoned pieces of tofu skin, tying closed the bundle with string, and steaming until a meaty texture and flavor developed.

=== Log ===
Other methods include rolling the tofu skin tightly on a chopstick and steaming it to form a log. When the log is sliced, each slice will be circular with a square hole in the center, which looks like old Chinese coins.

== Gallery ==
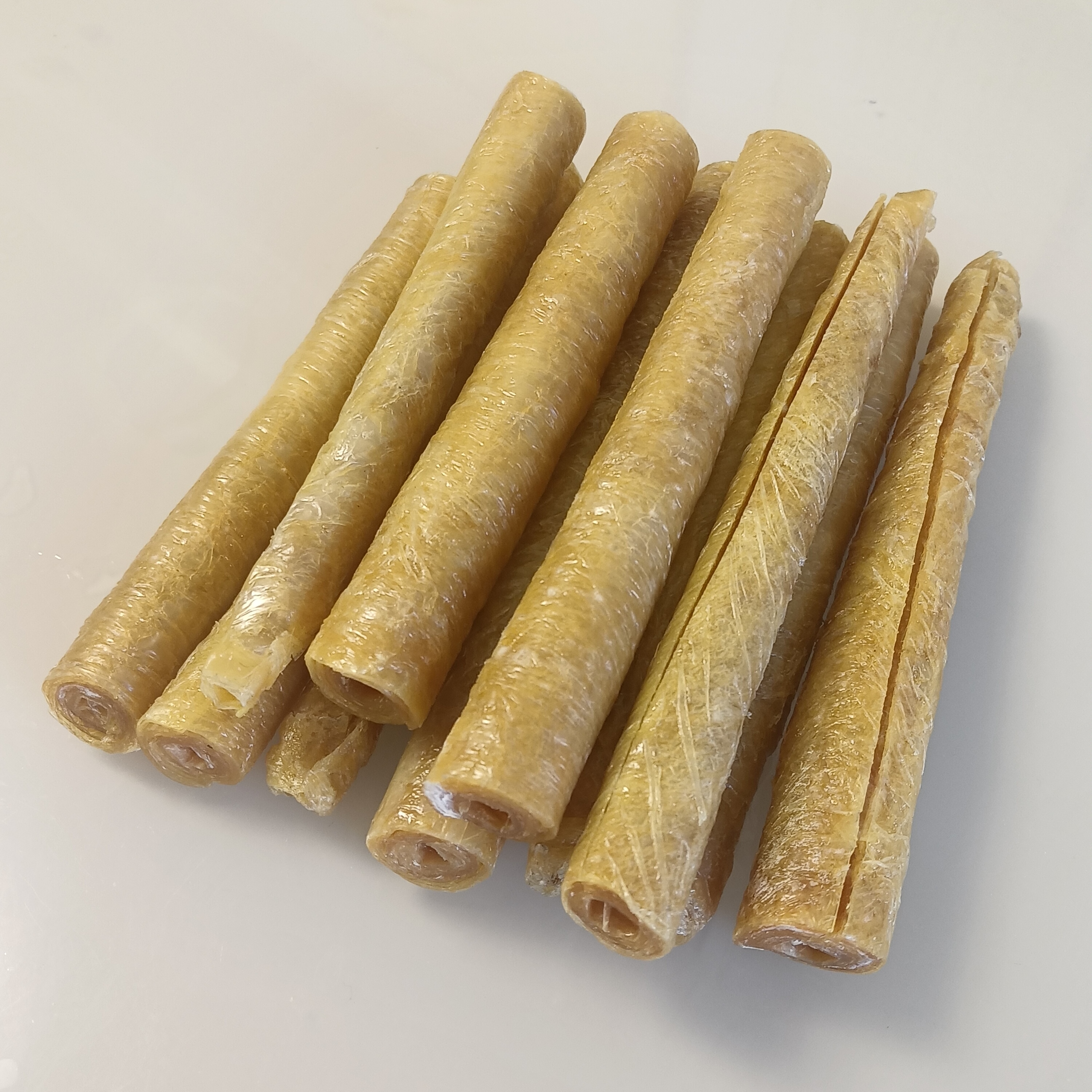
Dried rolls

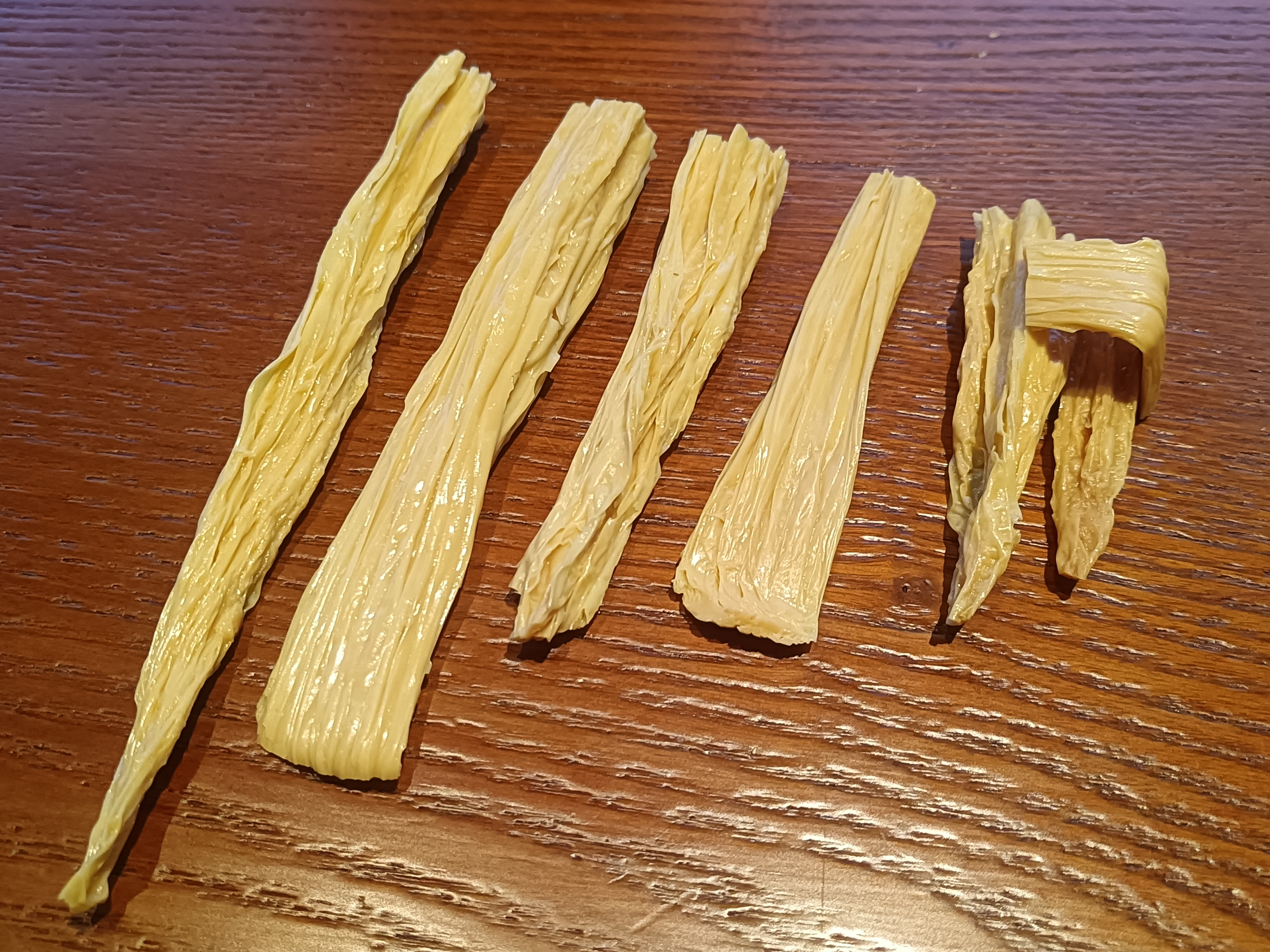
Dried fuzhu sticks

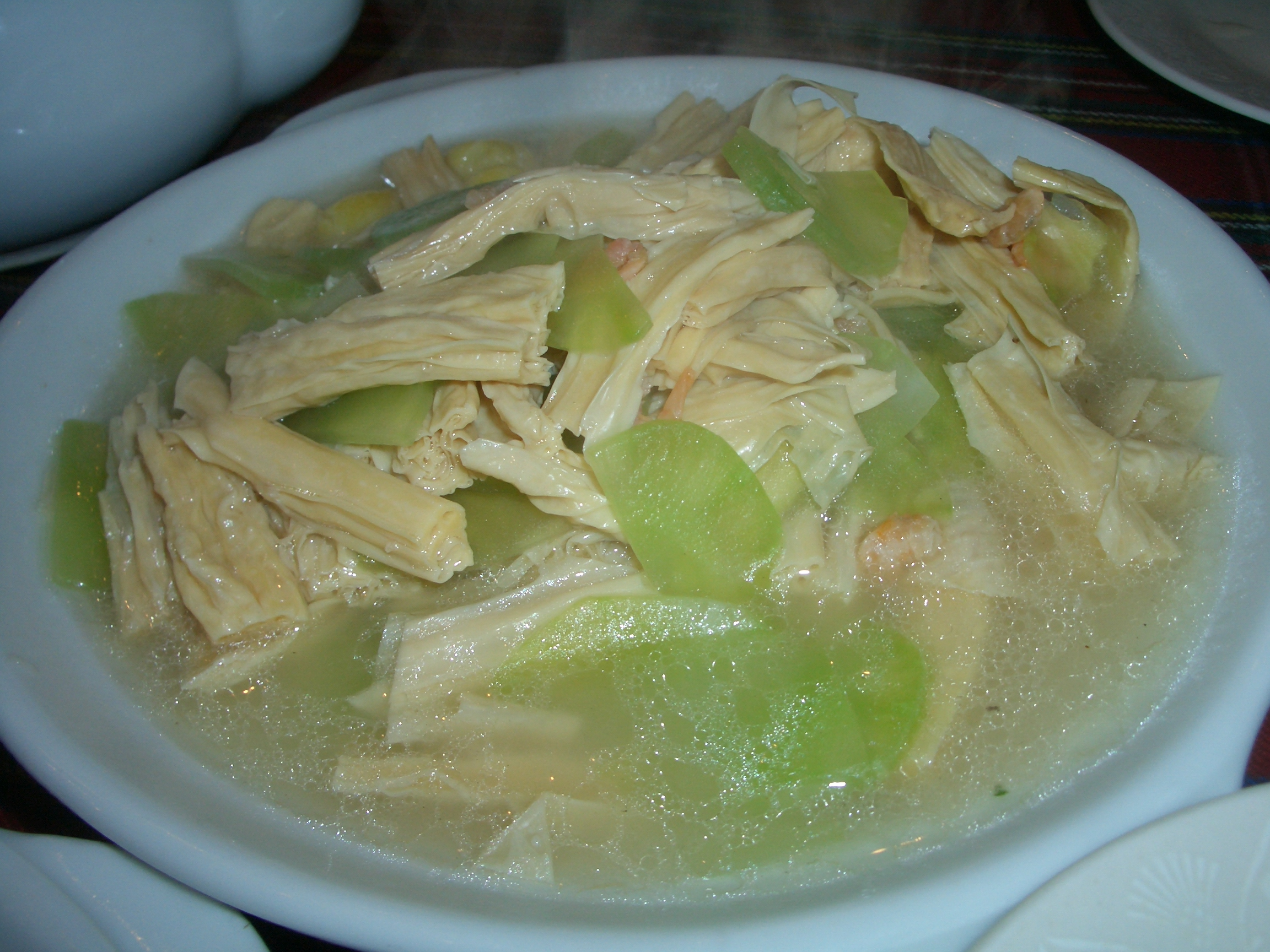
Cooked fuzhu

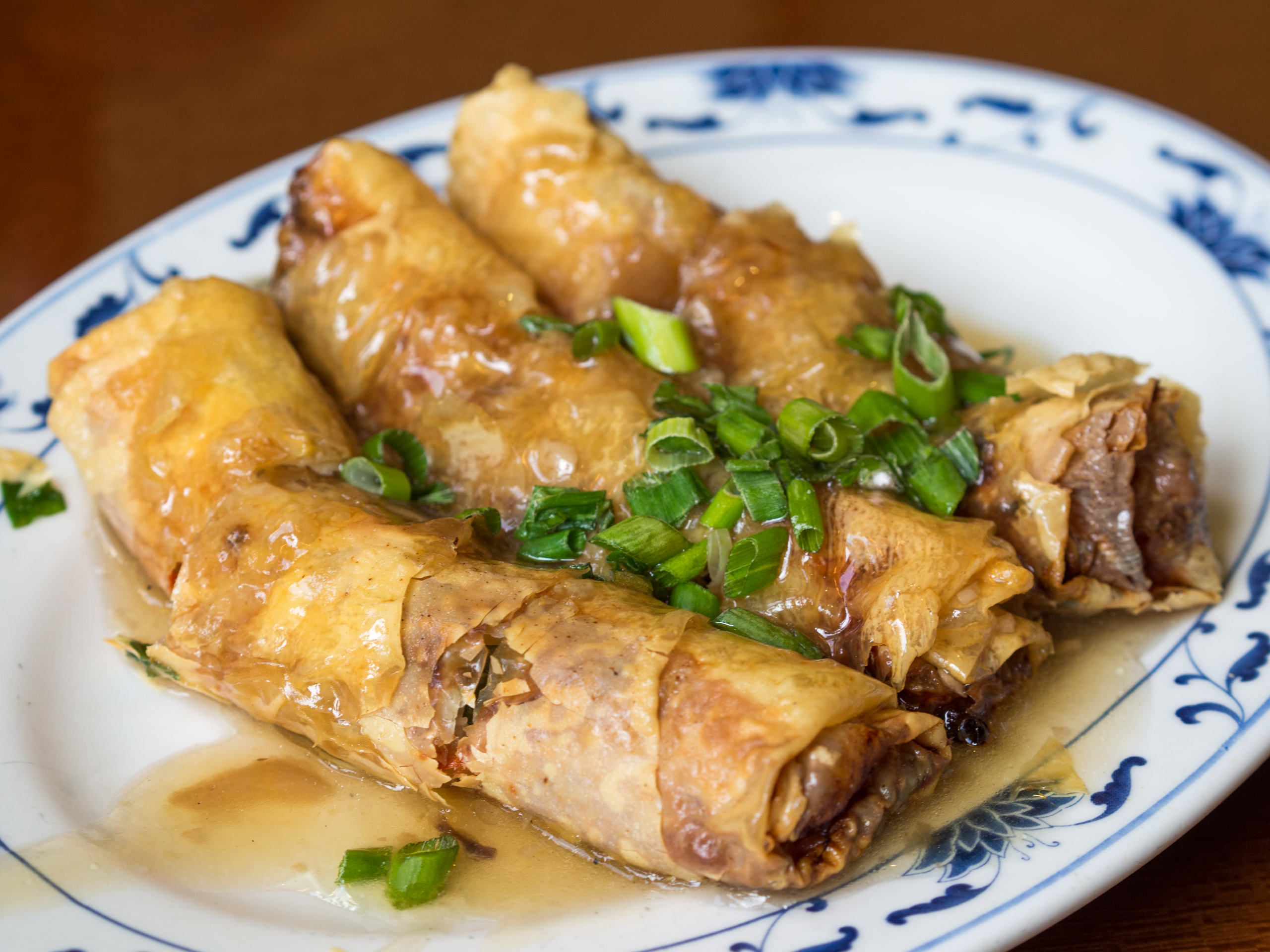
Tofu skin roll as dim sum

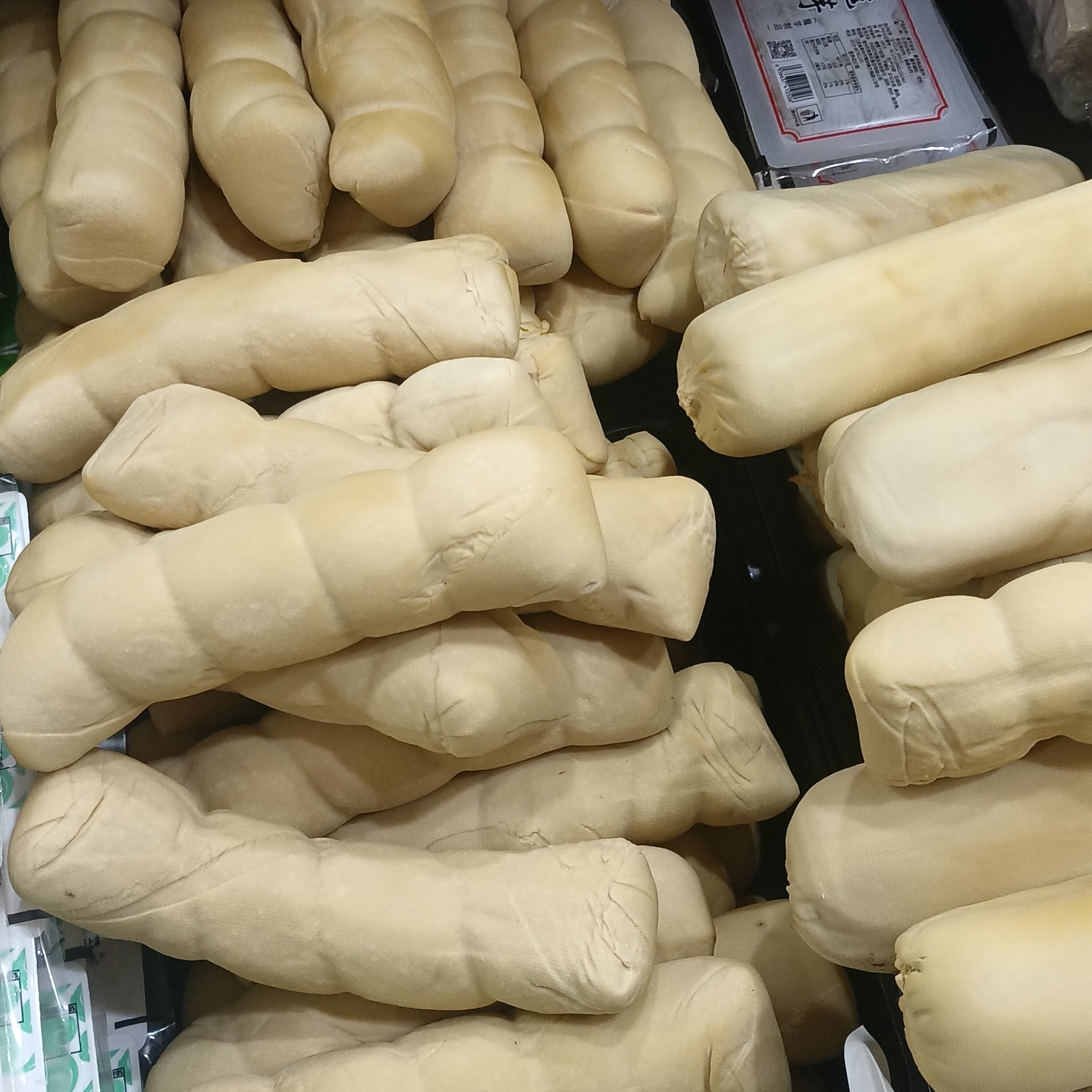
Imitation chicken rolls

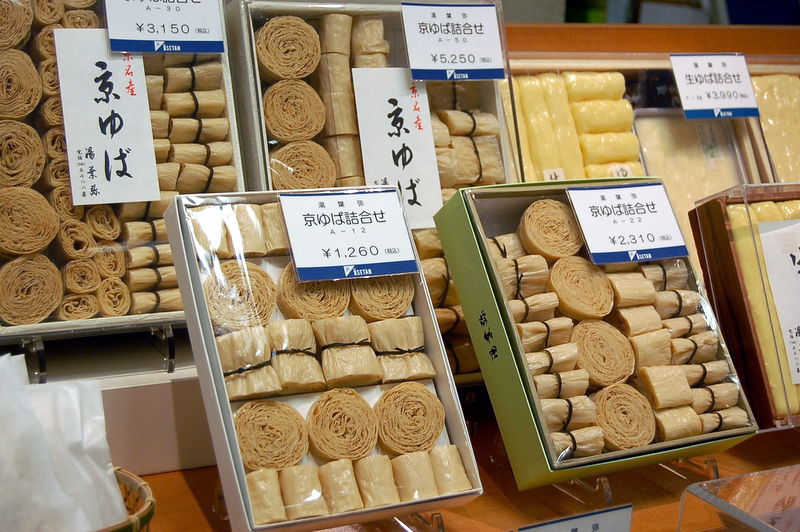
Dried and portioned yuba for sale

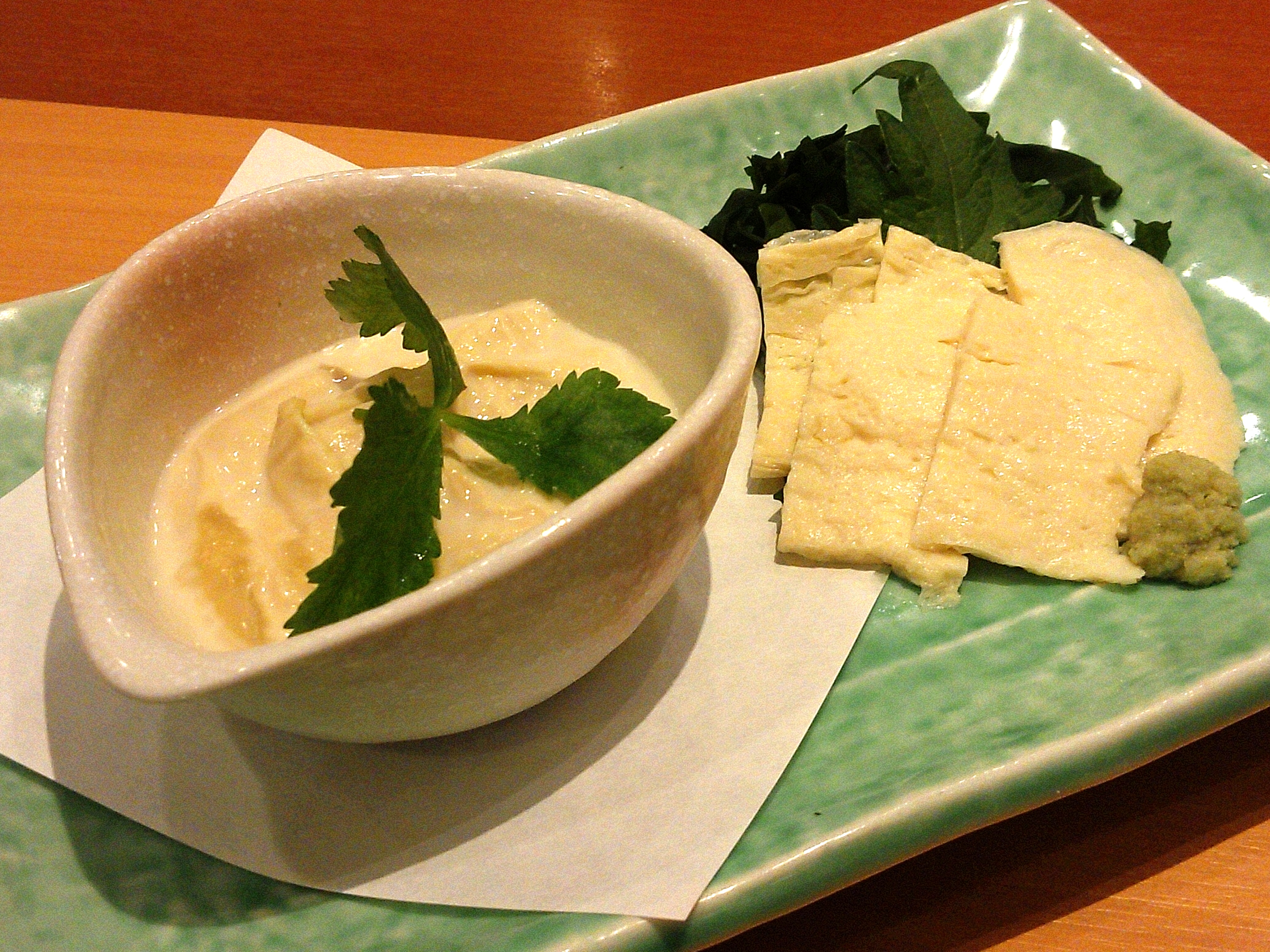
Two types of yuba: kumiage yuba (freshly scooped) and sashimi yuba (served raw like sashimi)

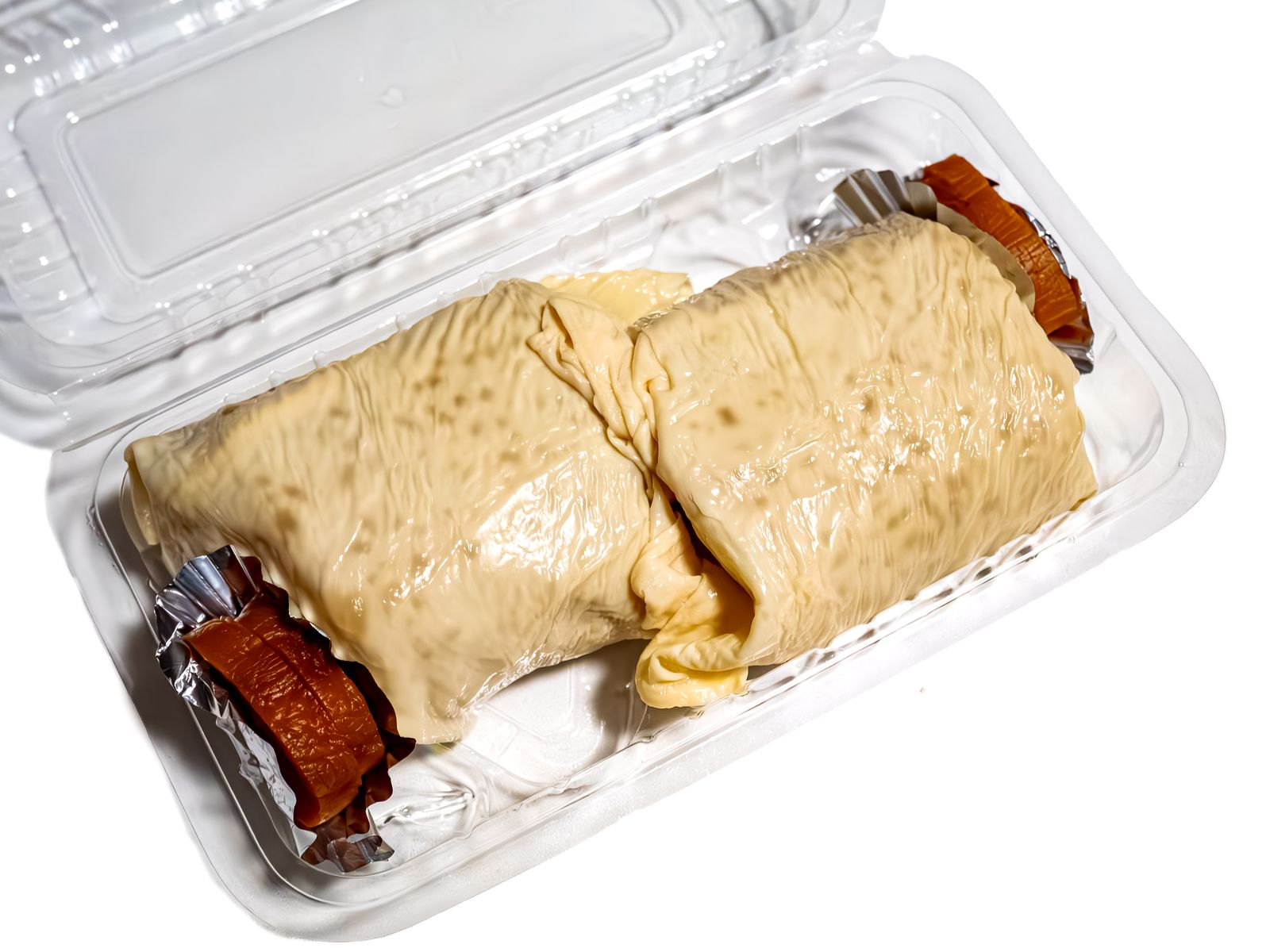
Yuba musubi

== See also ==
- Tofu skin roll
- Dim sum
- Abura-age
